= William H. Press =

American scientist (born 1948)

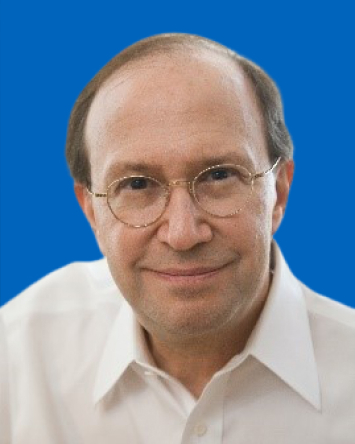
- Born: William Henry Press; May 23, 1948 (age 78); New York City, U.S.
- Education: Harvard University, (A.B.); California Institute of Technology, (Ph.D.)
- Known for: Press–Schechter formalism Numerical Recipes
- Scientific career
- Fields: theoretical physics astrophysics computer science
- Workplaces: Harvard University; Los Alamos National Laboratory; University of Texas at Austin
- Doctoral advisor: Kip Thorne
- Doctoral students: Ethan Vishniac; David Spergel; Robert Brandenberger; Adam Riess

William Henry Press (born May 23, 1948) is an astrophysicist, theoretical physicist, computer scientist, and computational biologist. He is a member of the U.S. National Academy of Sciences, the American Academy of Arts and Sciences, and the Council on Foreign Relations. In 1989, he was elected a Fellow of the American Physical Society "in recognition of important theoretical contributions to relativistic astrophysics and to cosmology" Other honors include the 1981 Helen B. Warner Prize for Astronomy. Press has been a member of the JASON defense advisory group since 1977 and is a past chair.

From 2009 through 2016, Press served as vice-chair of President Obama's President's Council of Advisors on Science and Technology (PCAST). In 2012–2013, he served as the 165th President of the American Association for the Advancement of Science. In July, 2016, he became the elected treasurer of the U.S. National Academy of Sciences, and a member of its council and governing board.

== Early life and education ==
The son of geophysicist Frank Press, and a schoolteacher mother and administrator who "loved teaching science to kids, Press attended public schools in Pasadena, California, graduating from Pasadena High School in 1965.

Press identified his early educational experience as having specifically benefited from the boons of the post WWII educational drive and the sexism of that same era, when "women were limited in their career choices, and many smart women became schoolteachers," and WWII veterans, "who had gone to college on the GI Bill of Rights ... saw public-school teaching as an upwardly mobile profession."

His undergraduate education was at Harvard, where he received an A.B. in physics in 1969. He received his Ph.D. in theoretical physics from Caltech in 1972 as a student of Kip Thorne.

== Career ==
Press was briefly an assistant professor at Caltech, then was an assistant professor at Princeton University (1974–1976) before returning to Harvard as a professor in 1976. At the age of 28, he was the university's then-youngest tenured faculty member (a distinction earlier held by Alan Dershowitz and later by Lawrence Summers and—at age 26—Noam Elkies).

Press was for more than 20 years a professor of astronomy and physics at Harvard University, and a member of the Center for Astrophysics | Harvard & Smithsonian. He was department chair in Astronomy in 1982–1985. In 1998, Press left Harvard to become deputy laboratory director at Los Alamos National Laboratory (LANL), serving under Directors John C. Browne and George Peter Nanos. He oversaw LANL's participation in the Joint Genome Institute and in the construction of the Spallation Neutron Source. Press moved to the University of Texas at Austin in 2007 and, changing his area of research, became the Warren J. and Viola M. Raymer Professor, jointly in the computer science and integrative biology departments.

== Research ==
In the field of general relativity, Press is best known for his work with Saul Teukolsky, establishing the dynamic stability of rotating black holes. In astrophysics, Press is best known for his discovery, with Paul Schechter, of the Press–Schechter formalism, which predicts the distribution of masses of galaxies in the Universe; and for his work with Adam Riess and Robert Kirshner on the calibration of distant supernovas as "standard candles". This latter work enabled the discovery of the accelerating universe by Riess, Brian Schmidt, and Saul Perlmutter, for which they received the 2011 Nobel Prize in Physics.

Notably, with the 2017 Nobel award to Kip Thorne, Press joined the list of hapless individuals whose student and doctoral advisor have both won Nobels, but they haven't, a list that comprises Alfred Sturtevant, Gilbert N. Lewis, J. Robert Oppenheimer, Edward Teller, Victor Weisskopf, Charles Lauritsen, E.B. Wilson, Richard A. Muller, Sam Treiman, Sidney Coleman and a few others.

With Freeman Dyson, Press discovered and named the zero-determinant strategies for the Prisoner's Dilemma and other games.

== Publications ==
Press is a co-author of the successful textbook Numerical Recipes (three editions, as of 2019 more than 400,000 copies in print) on scientific computing.
