= Michael R. Anastasio =

American physicist

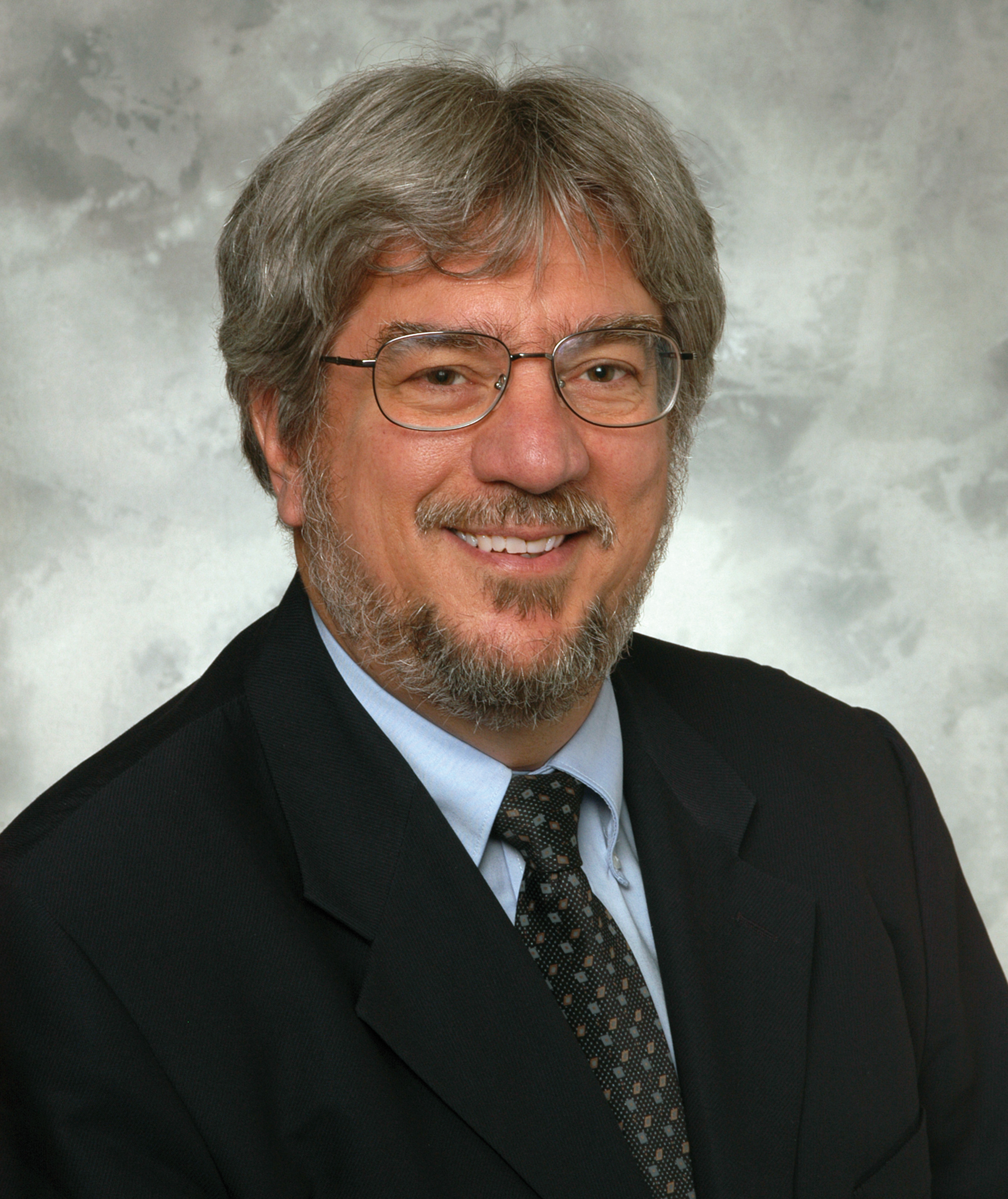
- Anastasio in 2008

9th Director of the Los Alamos National Laboratory
- In office June 1, 2006 – May 31, 2011
- Preceded by: Robert W. Kuckuck
- Succeeded by: Charles F. McMillan

9th Director of the Lawrence Livermore National Laboratory
- In office 2002–2006
- Preceded by: C. Bruce Tarter
- Succeeded by: George H. Miller

Personal details
- Born: 1948 (age 77–78)
- Spouse: Ann Anastasio
- Education: Johns Hopkins University, Stony Brook
- Profession: Theoretical nuclear physics

Michael Anastasio (born 1948) led two national science laboratories during a time of transition. He was the director of the Los Alamos National Laboratory and president of the Los Alamos National Security LLC, the company that operates the laboratory. He is the former director of Lawrence Livermore National Laboratory (LLNL). The University of California Board of Regents appointed Michael R. Anastasio the director of LLNL on June 4, 2002. He started on July 1, 2002. In 2005 he became the president of the Los Alamos National Security LLC, and became the director of the Los Alamos National Laboratory on June 1, 2006. During his directorship at Lawrence Livermore, the laboratory won 25 R&D 100 Awards and maintained its world-class leadership position in high-performance computing and its application to global climate modeling.

He has a bachelor's degree in physics from Johns Hopkins University and earned M.S. and Ph.D. degrees in theoretical nuclear physics from the State University of New York at Stony Brook. His career at LLNL began in 1980 as a physicist in B-Division, one of the two nuclear weapons design divisions. He participated in the development of the W87, W84, and B83 warheads and 10 nuclear tests; he was project physicist on four of these tests. In 1991, he was made B-division leader and program manager responsible for primary weapons design. From 1996 to 2001, he served as associate director for Defense and Nuclear Technologies, responsible for all activities in the laboratory's nuclear weapons program. In that capacity, he was instrumental in the development and execution of the national Stockpile Stewardship Program. From 2001 to 2002, Anastasio served as LLNL's deputy director for Strategic Operations.

He has 18 publications in intermediate energy theoretical nuclear physics and 800 citations. He received the Department of Energy Weapons Recognition of Excellence Award in 1990 and is a member of Sigma Pi Sigma, the national physics honor society; U.S. Strategic Command, Strategic Advisory Group; and the Defense Science Board Task Force on Nuclear Capabilities.

He retired from his position as Laboratory Director at Los Alamos National Laboratory on June 1, 2011.
