= Thomas Mason (physicist) =

Canadian-American physicist (born 1964)

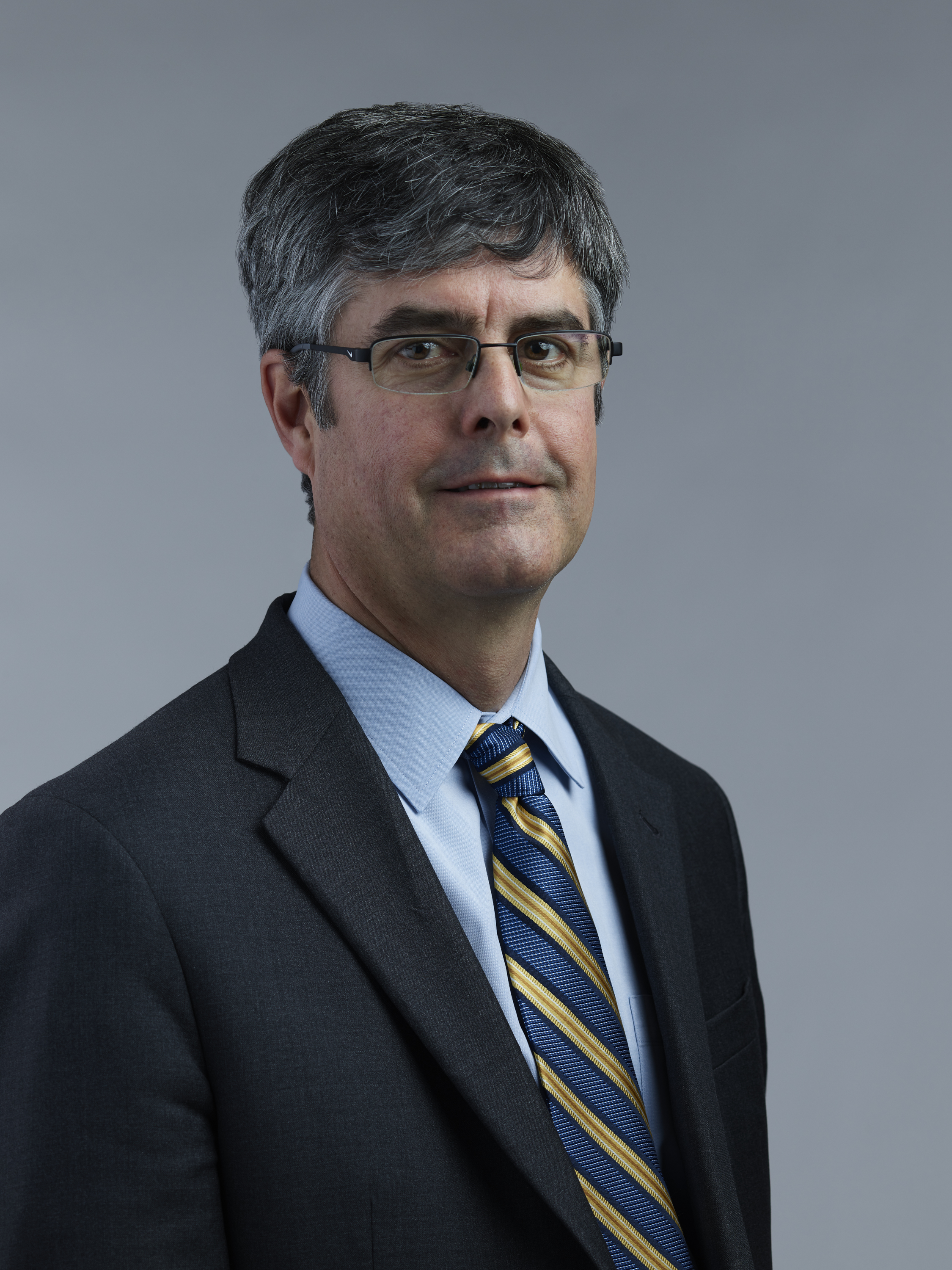
- Mason in 2018

12th Director of the Los Alamos National Laboratory
- Incumbent
- Assumed office 2018
- President: Donald Trump; Joe Biden
- Preceded by: Terry Wallace

14th Director of the Oak Ridge National Laboratory
- In office 2007 – June 30, 2017
- President: George W. Bush; Barack Obama; Donald Trump
- Preceded by: Jeff Wadsworth
- Succeeded by: Thomas Zacharia

Personal details
- Born: August 9, 1964 (age 62) Halifax, Nova Scotia, Canada
- Citizenship: Canadian, American
- Scientific career
- Education: Dalhousie University; McMaster University
- Fields: Condensed-matter physics
- Workplaces: AT&T Bell Laboratories; Risø National Laboratory; University of Toronto; Oak Ridge National Laboratory; Battelle Memorial Institute; Los Alamos National Laboratory
- Thesis: Critical Behavior of CsMnBr_{3} (1990)
- Doctoral advisor: M.F. Collins
- Website: Los Alamos National Laboratory website

Thomas Mason (born August 9, 1964) is a Canadian-American condensed-matter physicist who serves as the director of Los Alamos National Laboratory. Prior to this appointment, he had been an executive at Battelle Memorial Institute from 2017 to 2018, and the director of Oak Ridge National Laboratory from 2007 to 2017. Mason moved to Oak Ridge in 1998 at the start of construction of the Spallation Neutron Source which he led from 2001 until project completion in 2006.

== Early life ==
Mason was born in Dartmouth, Nova Scotia, in Halifax, Nova Scotia, Canada. His father was a geophysicist who worked at the Bedford Institute of Oceanography, and his mother a biochemist, was working at Dalhousie University in Halifax.

In 1986, Mason received his Bachelor in Science from Dalhousie University. In 1990, Mason received his doctorate in physics from McMaster University. In 1997, Mason was listed on Maclean's 100 Canadians To Watch list for his work in neutron scattering research. At the time, he was an associate professor in physics at the University of Toronto.

== Career ==
Mason started his career in the United States as the science director of the Spallation Neutron Source project in 1998. In 2007, Mason became the director of Oak Ridge National Laboratory, succeeding Dr. Jeffrey Wadsworth as the lab's 14th director. He stepped down from the position in 2017 to serve as the senior vice president for laboratory operations at Battelle Memorial Institute.

Mason became director at Los Alamos as part of the new Triad National Security LLC management team. In June, 2018, the National Nuclear Security Administration, headed by Lisa Gordon-Hagerty, announced that it had awarded an agency, called Triad National Security LLC, the $25 billion contract for security of the Los Alamos National Laboratory. Triad replaced the former Los Alamos National Security. The announcement of this action occurred on June 8, with notice to proceed on July 5, 2018. The contract includes a five-year base with five one-year options, for a total of 10 years if all options are exercised. With this contract came the appointment of Mason on November 1, 2018.

In December 2022, the operating and management contract for Triad National Security LLC was extended from Nov. 1, 2023 through Oct. 30, 2028.
