= Siegfried S. Hecker =

American metallurgist and nuclear scientist

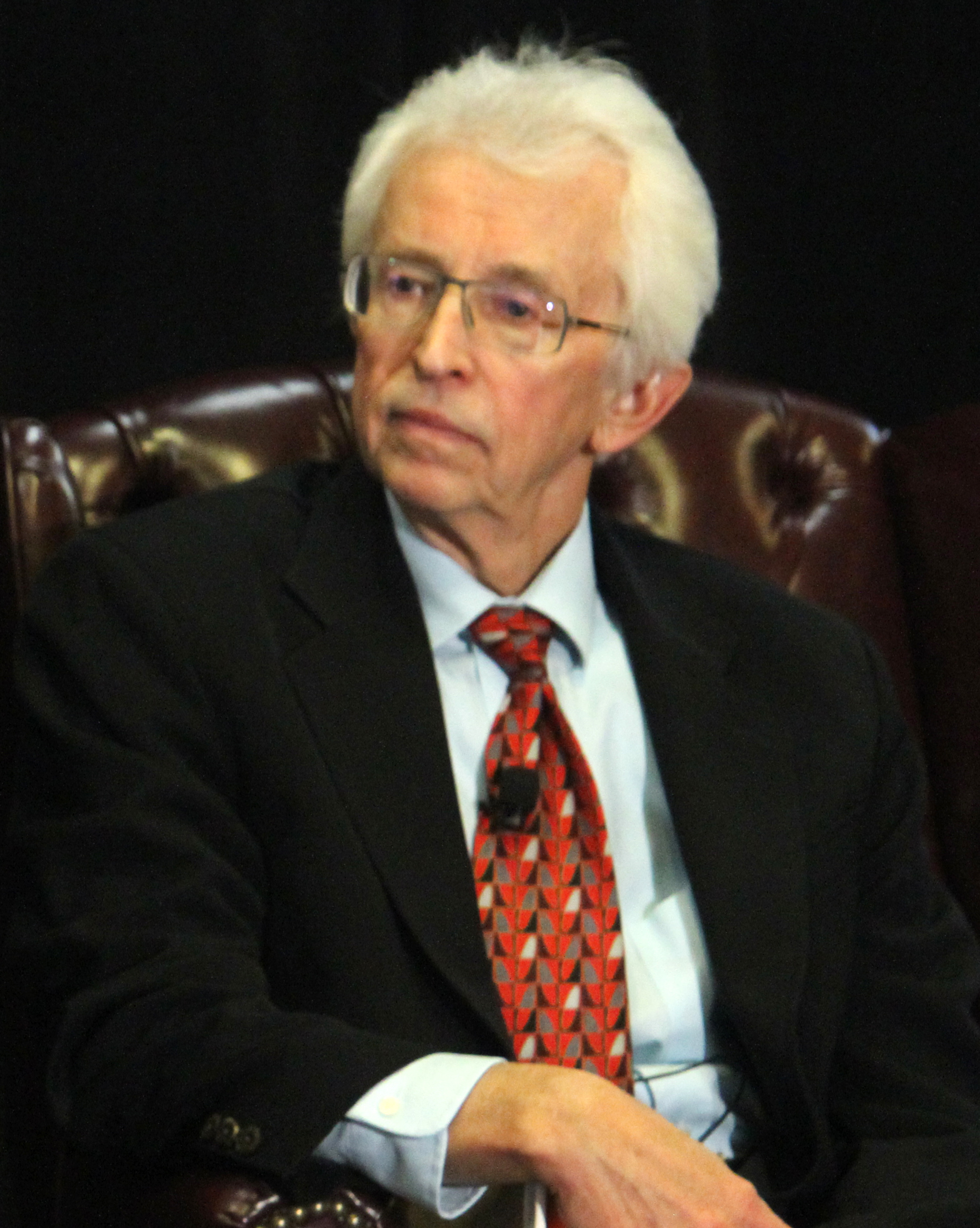
- Siegfried Hecker in 2011
- Born: October 2, 1943 (age 82); Tomaszew, Poland
- Education: Case Western Reserve University (B.Sc.), (M.Sc.), (Ph.D.)
- Known for: Nuclear weapons, Nuclear proliferation, Nuclear strategy
- Awards: Enrico Fermi Award, Seaborg Medal USDOE Distinguished Associate Award, Ernest Orlando Lawrence Award
- Scientific career
- Fields: Metallurgical Engineering
- Workplaces: Los Alamos National Laboratory; Center for International Security and Cooperation; Freeman Spogli Institute for International Studies; Stanford University

Siegfried S. Hecker (born October 2, 1943) is an American metallurgist and nuclear scientist. He served as Director of Los Alamos National Laboratory from 1986 to 1997 and is now affiliated with Stanford University, where he is research professor emeritus in the Department of Management Science and Engineering in the School of Engineering, and senior fellow emeritus at the Freeman Spogli Institute for International Studies. During this time, he was also elected a member of the National Academy of Engineering (1988) for outstanding research on plutonium and the forming of materials, and for leadership in developing energy and weapons systems.

== Biography ==
=== Early life ===
Hecker's parents came from Sarajevo, Bosnia, and were moved during World War II to Tomaszew, Poland, where Hecker was born. When his father had not returned from the war at the Eastern Front, his mother remarried and settled in Rottenmann, Austria. The family emigrated from Styria to the US in 1956.

=== Education ===
Hecker completed his Bachelor of Science in Metallurgy in 1965, his Master of Science in Metallurgy in 1967, and his Doctor of Philosophy in Metallurgical Engineering in 1968, all from Case Western Reserve University. He then spent two years as a postdoctoral appointee at the Los Alamos National Laboratory.

=== Professional career ===
Hecker began his professional career as a senior research metallurgist with the General Motors Research Laboratories in 1970.

=== Los Alamos ===
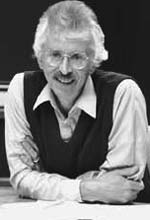
Hecker while director of Los Alamos National Laboratory

After Hecker's return to the Los Alamos National Laboratory, he led the laboratory's Materials Science and Technology Division and Center for Materials Science. He then served as the fifth Director of the Los Alamos National Laboratory from 1986 till 1997 and was a Los Alamos Senior Fellow until 2005.

=== Stanford University ===
He first came to Stanford University as a visiting professor in 2005. In 2007 he became co-director of the Stanford University Center for International Security and Cooperation (CISAC) in the Freeman Spogli Institute for International Studies and held this post until 2012.

=== Other activities ===
==== Nuclear Threat Initiative ====
Hecker also acts as advisor to the Nuclear Threat Initiative board of directors and belongs to the advisory council of CRDF Global, an independent nonprofit organization that promotes international scientific and technical collaboration.

==== Visits to North Korea ====
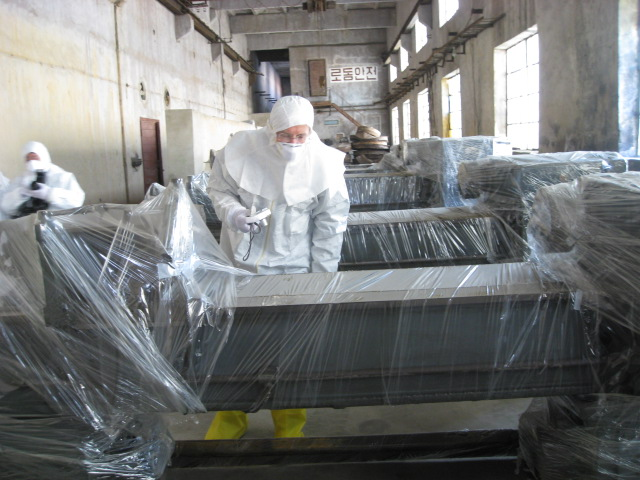
Hecker visiting the disabled Yongbyon Nuclear Scientific Research Center, North Korea, in 2008

He has visited North Korea frequently in an unofficial capacity to assess the plutonium program at the Yongbyon Nuclear Scientific Research Center (once every year since 2004). In November 2010, Hecker visited the Yongbyon nuclear facility and reported on its advanced state. In February 2019 Hecker along with Robert L. Carlin and Elliot A. Serbin published an update to North Koreas nuclear history study saying that in 2018 North Korea "took significant steps to halt and roll back key parts of its nuclear program" and Kim Jong Un "took the extraordinary step of ending nuclear tests and missile tests, not just declaring a moratorium." in the study it also suggests the North Korea, South Korea, and the US explore cooperative efforts to demilitarize North Korea’s nuclear and missile programs and convert them to civilian nuclear and space programs.

==== Memberships in organizations ====
In addition to his National Academy of Engineering (NAE) membership, Dr. Hecker is a foreign member of the Russian Academy of Sciences and India Institute of Metals; fellow of the Minerals, Metallurgy and Materials Society (TMS), American Society for Metals, American Physical Society (APS), American Association for the Advancement of Science (AAAS), and American Academy of Arts and Sciences; and honorary member of the American Ceramics Society.

== Awards ==
His achievements have been recognized with the American Nuclear Society's Seaborg Medal and many other awards including the 2018 National Engineering Award from the American Association of Engineering Societies, the 2017 American Nuclear Society Eisenhower Medal, the Navy League of the U.S.'s TR & FD Roosevelt Gold Medal for Science Award in 1996, the AAAS Award for Science Diplomacy, the Leo Szilard Lectureship (APS), the Department of Energy's E.O. Lawrence Award, the LANL Medal, and the Case Western Reserve University Alumni Association Gold Medal and Undergraduate Distinguished Alumni Award.

The Secretary of Energy named Hecker, co-recipient of the 2009 Enrico Fermi Award. This Presidential Award is one of the oldest and most prestigious given by the U.S. Government and carries an honorarium of $375,000. He shares the honor with John Bannister Goodenough, a professor at the University of Texas at Austin.

In 2022, Hecker was an honoree by the Carnegie Corporation of New York's Great Immigrant Award.

== Publications ==
- Hecker, Siegfried S.; Ghosh, A. K.; Gegel, H. L. "Formability, analysis, modeling, and experimentation: Proceedings of a symposium held in Chicago, Illinois, October 24 and 25, 1977"; Metallurgical Society of AIME (1978).
- Hecker, S. S. "The Role of the DOE Weapons Laboratories in a Changing National Security Environment: CNSS Papers No. 8, April 1988", Los Alamos National Laboratory, Center for National Security Studies United States Department of Energy, (April 1988).
- Hecker, S. S. "The Cold War is Over. What Now?", Los Alamos National Laboratory, United States Department of Energy, (April 1995).
- Siegfried Hecker, Gian-Carlo Rota. "Essays on the Future: In Honor of Nick Metropolis 1996th Edition" (2000).
- Fluss, M.; Tobin, J.; Schwartz, A.; Petrovtsev, A. V.; Nadykto, B. A.; Timofeeva, L. F. Hecker, S. S. & V. E. Arkhipov. "6th US-Russian Pu Science Workshop Lawrence Livermore National Laboratory University of California, Livermore, California, July 14 and 15, 2006", Lawrence Livermore National Laboratory, United States Department of Energy, (June 20, 2006).
- Hecker, Siegfried; Lee, Sean; Braun, Chaim. "North Korea's Choice: Bombs Over Electricity", National Academy of Engineering, (Summer 2010).
- Hecker, S.S. "Doomed to Cooperate: How American and Russian Scientists Joined Forces to Avert Some of the Greatest Post-Cold War Nuclear Dangers (2016).
- Hecker, S.S., Serbin, E.A., "Hinge Points: An Inside Look at North Korea's Nuclear Program", Stanford University Press, (January 2023).

Government offices
Preceded by Donald Kerr	Director of the Los Alamos National Laboratory; 1986–1997	Succeeded by John C. Browne
