= Mass function =

Mass function may refer to:

- Binary mass function, a function that gives the minimum mass of a star or planet in a spectroscopic binary system
- Halo mass function, a function that describes the mass distribution of dark matter halos
- Initial mass function, a function that describes the distribution of star masses when they initially form, before evolution
- Probability mass function, a function that gives the probability that a discrete random variable is exactly equal to some value
