= Terry Wallace (geophysicist) =

Terry C. Wallace Jr.
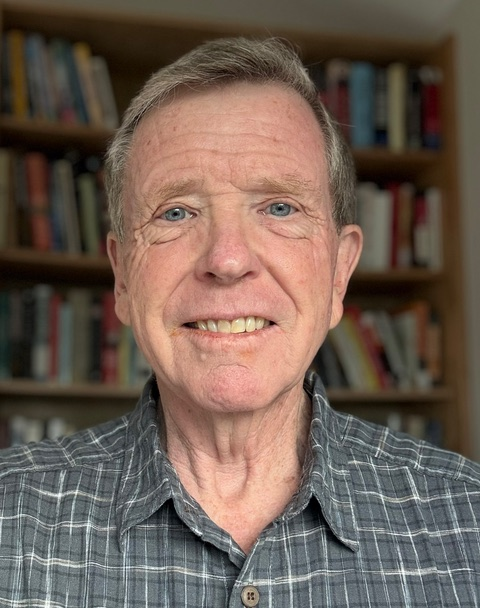

11th Director of the Los Alamos National Laboratory
- In office January 1, 2018 – November 1, 2018
- Preceded by: Charles F. McMillan
- Succeeded by: Thom Mason

Personal details
- Born: June 30, 1956 (age 70)
- Education: New Mexico Institute of Mining and Technology (BS); California Institute of Technology (MS, PhD)
- Profession: Geophysicist

Terry C. Wallace Jr. (born June 30, 1956) is an American geophysicist, forensic seismologist, educator and science administrator. He is Director Emeritus of the Los Alamos National Laboratory, where he served as the 11th Director in 2018. Wallace’s research focuses on geophysics, nuclear test monitoring, and global security, and he is internationally recognized for his expertise in geophysics and forensic seismology.

== Early life and education ==
The son of the Los Alamos National Laboratory staff member Terry Wallace Sr. and the late Jeannette Wallace, a long-serving Republican member of the New Mexico State Legislature, Wallace was raised in Los Alamos, New Mexico and graduated from Los Alamos High School in 1974. He earned a Bachelor of Science degree in geophysics and mathematics from the New Mexico Institute of Mining and Technology, where he was awarded the Brown Medal, New Mexico Tech’s highest undergraduate honor.

Wallace then attended California Institute of Technology where he received a MS and PhD in geophysics.

== Academic and research career ==
From 1983 to 2003, Wallace served as a professor of geosciences at the University of Arizona, where he also held an appointment in the applied mathematics program. During his academic career, he authored numerous peer‑reviewed articles and was co-author of the widely used seismology textbook Modern Global Seismology. He also served as curator of the University of Arizona Mineral Museum and directed the Southern Arizona Seismic Observatory.

Wallace’s primary research expertise is in forensic seismology, the study of seismic waves as they relate to earthquakes and underground nuclear tests. He has evaluated more than 1,700 U.S. and foreign nuclear tests, making him one of the world’s leading authorities in the field.

== Awards and recognition ==
In 1992, he was named a fellow in the American Geophysical Union and served on the Board of Earth Sciences & Resources in the National Academy of Sciences from 2001 to 2008. He also served as vice president (1995) and president (1999-2000) of the Seismological Society of America. He served on the board of directors for the Mineralogical Record from 1990 to 1999, including as president from 1995 to 1997. He was also chairman of the Incorporated Research Institutions for Seismology (1994-1996) and is a current member of the Air Force Technical Applications Center‘s Seismic Review Panel (2000–present).

His awards include the Brown Medal (1978), the Langmuir Medal for Research (1985), the Macelwane Medal (1992), and the Carnegie Mineralogical Award (2002).

In 2011, a mineral Terrywallaceite was named after him in recognition of his efforts in education, research, and service to mineralogy.

=== Los Alamos National Laboratory ===
Wallace joined Los Alamos National Laboratory (LANL) in 2003. He served as Principal Associate Director for Science, Technology, and Engineering before becoming Principal Associate Director for Global Security, where he oversaw national security programs including nonproliferation, counterproliferation, intelligence, and partnerships with the Department of Defense and industry. Wallace serviced as the Chief Intelligence Official from 2011-2017.

On January 1, 2018, Wallace became the 11th Director of LANL and President of Los Alamos National Security, LLC, leading the laboratory through a period of scientific and organizational transition with an annual budget of approximately $2.8 billion and a workforce of over 11,000 people. He served as director until his retirement at the end of 2018 and was subsequently named Director Emeritus.

In October 2018, Wallace received the NNSA Gold Award, the highest honor bestowed by the National Nuclear Security Administration, in recognition of his service to the U.S. energy and security mission.

== Research and scholarly works ==
Wallace’s scholarly output includes more than 130 peer‑reviewed publications on various aspects of seismology, earth structure, and nuclear test monitoring. These articles have appeared in leading scientific journals and contributed substantially to the fields of seismic source characterization, regional seismic waveform analysis, and tectonic interpretation.

Among his most significant academic contributions is the co‑authorship of the graduate‑level textbook Modern Global Seismology (with Thorne Lay). First published in 1995, this textbook is a comprehensive primer on seismic theory and data interpretation, covering elastic wave propagation, seismic instrumentation, seismogram analysis, and seismotectonics, and it remains one of the most widely used texts in advanced seismology education. The book has since been updated in later editions to reflect advances in quantitative earthquake source mechanics and modern broadband seismic methods.

Wallace’s peer‑reviewed research articles encompass a broad range of topics, including regional body waves, seismic inversion techniques, crust and mantle structure, and the mechanics of deep earthquakes, contributing to both foundational geophysics and practical seismic monitoring applications. His doctoral dissertation at the California Institute of Technology (1983), titled “Long Period Regional Body Waves,” explored seismic waveforms and regional propagation characteristics that have informed later studies in seismic source and structural analysis.

During his academic tenure at the University of Arizona, Wallace carried out research on global threat reduction, nonproliferation verification, and computational geophysics, integrating his seismological expertise with national security challenges.

In addition to his scientific journal publications and textbooks, Wallace has contributed popular articles and books on mineralogy reflecting his lifelong interest in earth materials and has lectured widely on topics such as mineral formation and the geological history of metals. He also holds the rare distinction of having a mineral, terrywallaceite, named in his honor by the International Mineralogical Association for his contributions to education, research, and service in mineralogy.

Wallace is the author of Lia Fail -- the Earth Always speaks public essays on Earth science and related topics.

== Personal life ==
He is a wilderness ultra runner and hiker. Wallace is a mineral collector, a hobby fostered by his father from an early age. He has visited mining communities and mineral localities across both North and South America, and has written extensively on various aspects of mineralogy for amateurs. He is the author of a popular mineral book Collecting Arizona (2012), which chronicles the mineral history of the Copper State.

He is married to geophysicist Michelle Hall and has one son and three grandchildren.
