= Area 27 =

Area 27 can refer to:

- Brodmann area 27
- Area 27 (Nevada National Security Site)
- Area 27 - Road Race Track - Oliver, British Columbia, Canada
