= Charles F. McMillan =

American physicist (1954/1955–2024)

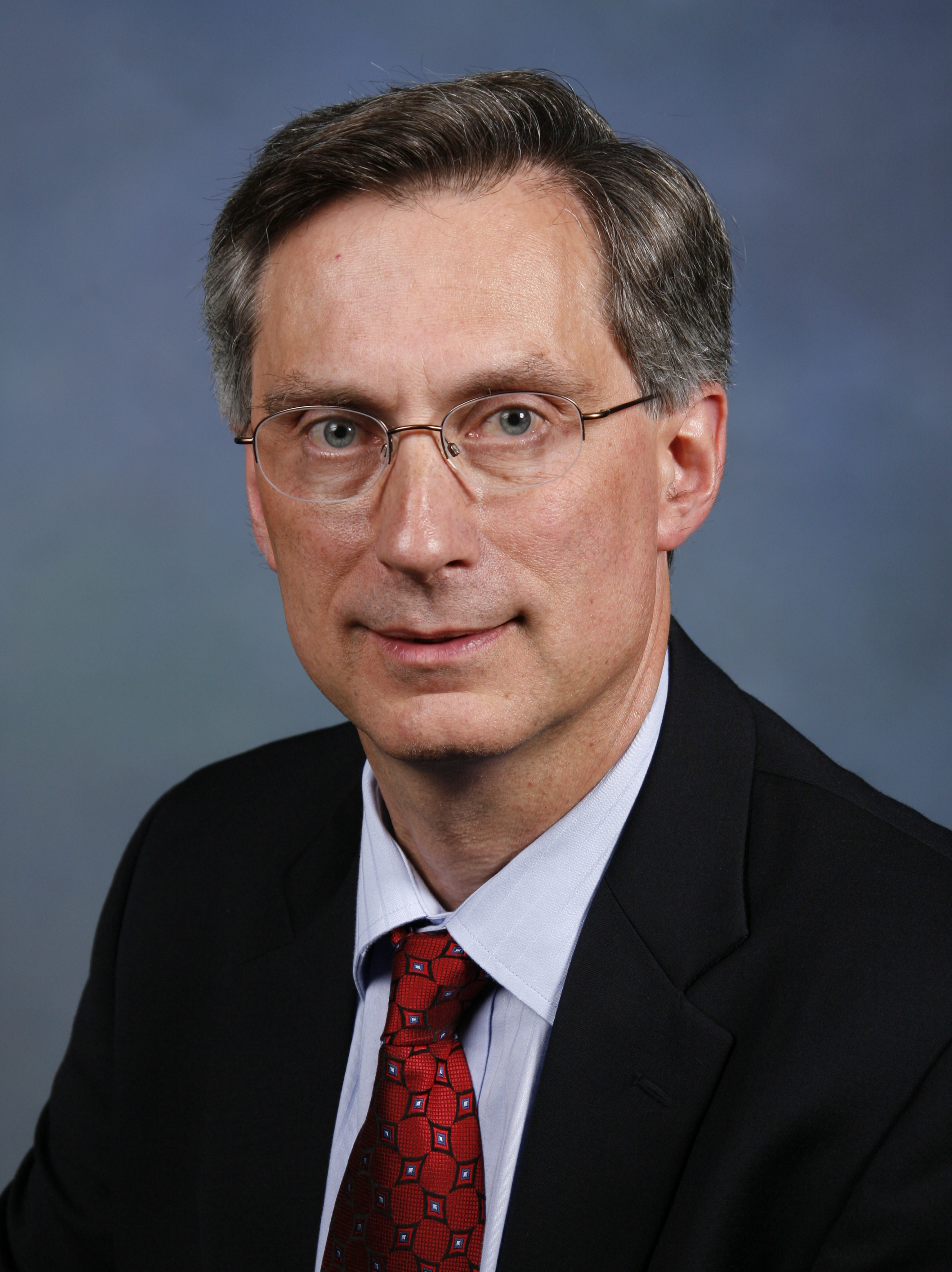
- McMillan in 2010

10th Director of the Los Alamos National Laboratory
- In office June 1, 2011 – December 31, 2017
- Preceded by: Michael R. Anastasio
- Succeeded by: Terry Wallace

Personal details
- Born: 1954 or 1955
- Died: September 6, 2024 (aged 69) Los Alamos, New Mexico, U.S.
- Education: Washington Adventist University Massachusetts Institute of Technology
- Occupation: Director
- Profession: Nuclear physicist, nuclear weapons

Charles F. McMillan (October 25, 1954 – September 6, 2024) was an American nuclear physicist and served as the 10th director of the Los Alamos National Laboratory. His appointment was effective June 1, 2011. He succeeded Michael R. Anastasio. On September 5, 2017, McMillan announced he would be leaving his position as director at the end of the year.

== Biography ==
Charles F. McMillan had been Principal Associate Director for Weapons Programs at Los Alamos and joined the laboratory in 2006, where he was responsible for directing the science, technology, engineering, and infrastructure that enables the Laboratory to deliver on its core mission of ensuring the safety, reliability, and performance of the nation's nuclear deterrent. McMillan was elected by peers to lead the Nuclear Security Enterprise Integration Council. Established in 1943 as part of the Manhattan Project, Los Alamos National Laboratory is a principal contributor to NNSA's programs to maintain the U.S. nuclear weapons stockpile and to reduce the international dangers posed by weapons of mass destruction.

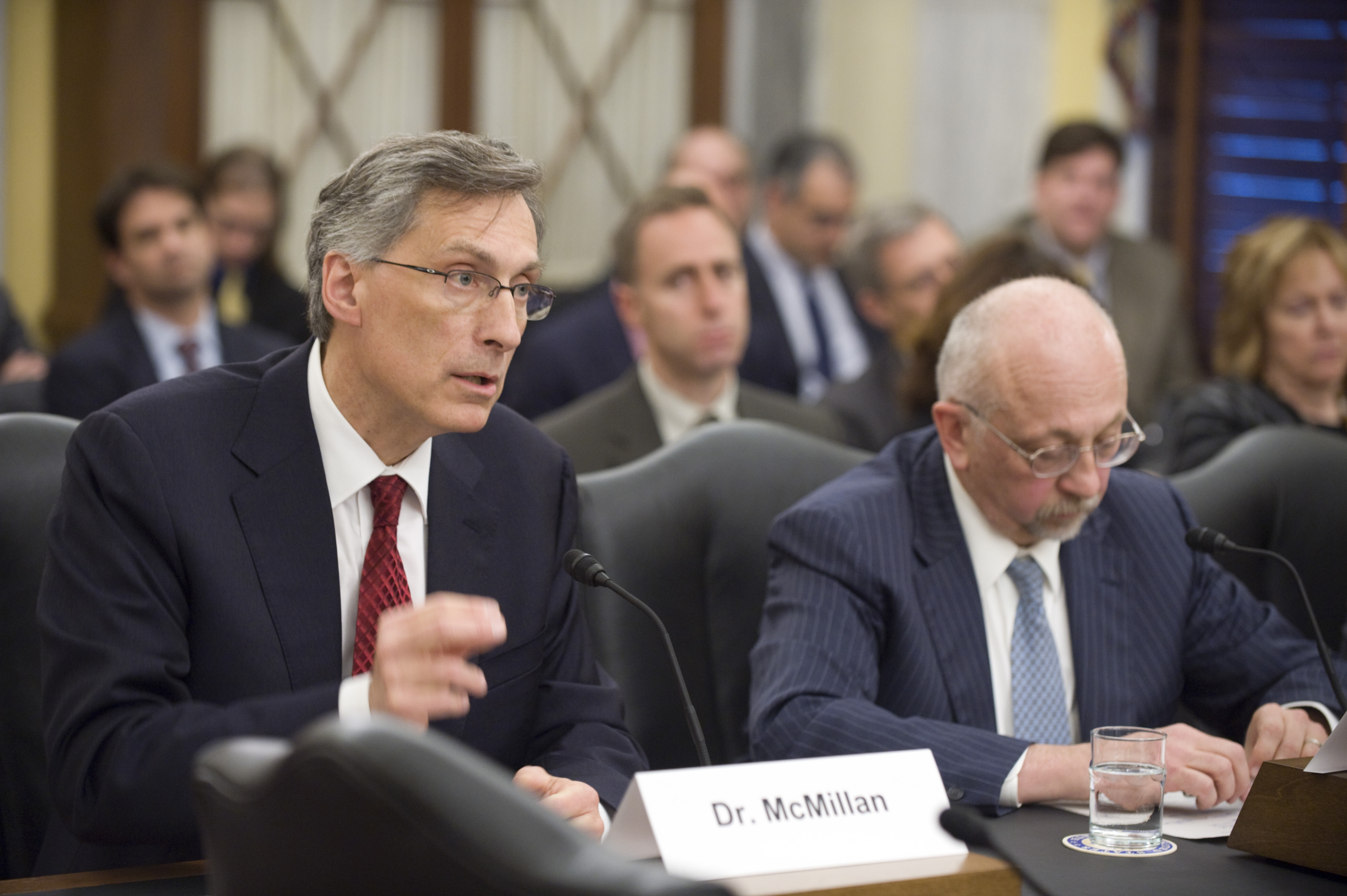
Charles F. McMillan (left) testifies before the United States Senate Committee on Armed Services, Strategic Forces Subcommittee, May 7, 2013. Sandia National Laboratories Director Paul Hommert is to the right.

McMillan was also president of Los Alamos National Security, LLC, the company that manages and operates the lab for the National Nuclear Security Administration.

Prior to joining Los Alamos, McMillan, an experimental physicist, spent more than 20 years at Lawrence Livermore National Laboratory in California, beginning in 1983. He held a doctorate in physics from the Massachusetts Institute of Technology and a bachelor of science in Mathematics and Physics from Washington Adventist University.

His annual compensation as director of the laboratory, including benefits and pension value increases, was reported as US$1,081,059 in 2011.

=== Personal life and death ===
McMillan was awarded two Department of Energy Awards of Excellence. He was married with three children. McMillan was also an avid photographer and accomplished musician, playing piano, organ, and recorder. He continued to perform in a baroque chamber music ensemble.

McMillan died in Los Alamos, New Mexico, on September 6, 2024, at the age of 69, as a result of injuries sustained in a traffic collision.

== Events ==
Charles F. McMillan presented a lecture on "The Timeline of Technology", offering examples of how innovations in the 20th century are used in this century to solve national and global security, energy and environmental issues, on October 1, 2014, at Howard H. Baker, Jr. Center for Public Policy. He stressed the importance of Los Alamos to national security, and reflected on the last Divider nuclear test, on September 23, 1992, in Operation Julin.

== Sources ==
- "Testimony of Dr. Charles F. McMillan, Laboratory Director, Los Alamos National Laboratory, before the Senate Committee on Armed Services Subcommittee on Strategic Forces" (PDF). United States Senate. 2012-04-18.
- Los Alamos Neutron Science Center (LANSCE)
- Dr. McMillan's presentation at UC Berkeley on Thursday, Sept. 13-2012
- Dr. Charles F. McMillan lecture, "The Timeline of Technology" at Howard H. Baker, Jr. Center for Public Policy, on Wednesday, October 1, 2014, 5:30 pm — fall semester Global Security Distinguished Lecture featuring Dr. Charles McMillan, Director, Los Alamos Laboratory in the Toyota Auditorium
