= Sheth–Tormen approximation =

Halo mass function

In physical cosmology, the Sheth–Tormen approximation is a halo mass function. It is named after Ravi K. Sheth and Giuseppe Tormen, who proposed their function in 1999.

== Background ==
The Sheth–Tormen approximation extends the Press–Schechter formalism by assuming that halos are not necessarily spherical, but merely elliptical. The distribution of the density fluctuation is as follows:
$$f(\sigma_r)=A\sqrt{\frac{2a}{\pi}}\left[1+\left(\frac{\sigma_r^2}{a\delta_c^2}\right)^{0.3}\right]\frac{\delta_c}{\sigma_r}\exp\left(-\frac{a\delta_c^2}{2\sigma_r^2}\right),$$
where $\delta_c=1.686$, $a=0.707$, and $A=0.3222$.

The parameters were empirically obtained from the five-year release of WMAP.

== Discrepancies with simulations ==
In 2010, the Bolshoi cosmological simulation predicted that the Sheth–Tormen approximation is inaccurate for the most distant objects. Specifically, the Sheth–Tormen approximation overpredicts the abundance of haloes by a factor of $10$ for objects with a redshift $z>10$, but is accurate at low redshifts.
