= Los Alamos National Laboratory =

National Laboratory in Los Alamos, New Mexico

- LANL

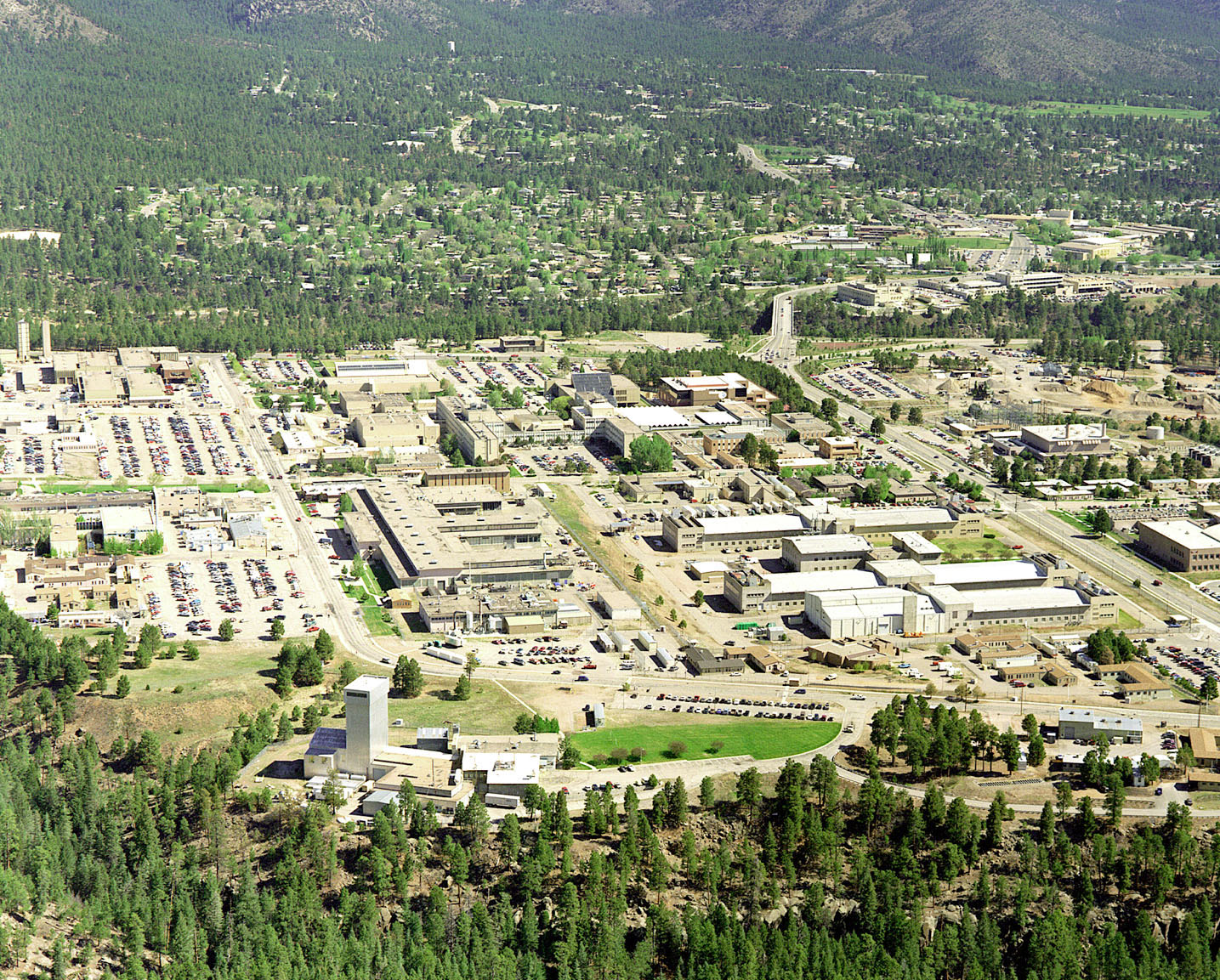
- Aerial view
- Established: 1943
- Budget: $4.9 billion
- Field of research: National security; Fundamental science
- Director: Thomas Mason
- Staff: 14,150
- Students: 1800
- Location: Los Alamos, New Mexico, United States; 35°52′32″N 106°19′27″W
- Affiliations: United States Department of Energy
- Operating agency: Triad National Security LLC
- Website: https://www.lanl.gov/
- Los Alamos Scientific Laboratory
- U.S. National Register of Historic Places
- U.S. Historic district
- U.S. National Historic Landmark District
- Location within New Mexico
- Location: West Jemez Road and Diamond Drive, Los Alamos, New Mexico
- Coordinates: 35°52′42″N 106°19′7″W
- Area: 22,200 acres (9,000 ha)
- Built: 1943
- Architectural style: Bungalow/Craftsman, Modern Movement, Ranch
- NRHP reference No.: 66000893

Significant dates
- Added to NRHP: October 15, 1966
- Designated NHLD: December 21, 1965

Los Alamos National Laboratory (LANL) is one of the sixteen research and development laboratories of the United States Department of Energy (DOE), located a short distance northwest of Santa Fe, New Mexico, in the American southwest. Best known for its central role in helping develop the first atomic bomb, LANL is one of the world's largest and most advanced scientific institutions.

Los Alamos was established in 1943 as Project Y, a top-secret site for designing and assembling nuclear weapons under the Manhattan Project during World War II. (Note: The site was variously called Los Alamos Laboratory and Los Alamos Scientific Laboratory.) This included both nuclear weapons used in the atomic bombings of Hiroshima and Nagasaki in August 1945, as well as Trinity, the first nuclear test, a month prior. Chosen for its remote yet relatively accessible location, it served as the main hub for conducting and coordinating nuclear research, bringing together some of the world's most famous scientists, among them numerous Nobel Prize winners. The town of Los Alamos, directly north of the lab, grew extensively through this period.

After the war ended in 1945, Project Y's existence was made public, and it became known universally as Los Alamos. In 1952, the Atomic Energy Commission formed a second design lab under the direction of the University of California, Berkeley, which became Lawrence Livermore National Laboratory (LLNL); the two labs competed on a wide variety of bomb designs. As the Cold War and its nuclear arms race began, Los Alamos remained central to the US effort. Under the "Super" program, Los Alamos physicists including Edward Teller and Stanisław Ulam developed the world's first thermonuclear weapons, Greenhouse George and Ivy Mike.Los Alamos subsequently produced the neutron bomb. The lab was involved in the origins of supercomputers, to further warhead development. Los Alamos also pioneered more fundamental nuclear research, including particle accelerators and nuclear fusion power experiments.

With the end of the Cold War and US nuclear testing, Los Alamos took on a central role in the US warhead stockpile stewardship program, via its Dual-Axis Radiographic Hydrodynamic Test Facility and Neutron Science Center. Los Alamos also expanded civilian work, and today conducts multidisciplinary research in fields such as national security, space exploration, nuclear fusion, renewable energy, medicine, nanotechnology, and supercomputing.

While owned by the federal government, LANL is privately managed and operated by Triad National Security, LLC.

== History ==
=== The Manhattan Project ===
The laboratory was founded during World War II as a secret, centralized facility to coordinate the scientific research of the Manhattan Project, the Allied project to develop the first nuclear weapons. In September 1942, the difficulties encountered in conducting preliminary studies on nuclear weapons at universities scattered across the country indicated the need for a laboratory dedicated solely to that purpose.

General Leslie Groves wanted a central laboratory at an isolated location for safety, and to keep the scientists away from the populace. It should be at least 200 miles from international boundaries and west of the Mississippi. Major John Dudley suggested Oak City, Utah, or Jemez Springs, New Mexico, but both were rejected. Jemez Springs was only a short distance from the current site. Project Y director J. Robert Oppenheimer had spent much time in his youth in the New Mexico area and suggested the Los Alamos Ranch School on the mesa. Dudley had rejected the school as not meeting Groves' criteria, but as soon as Groves saw it he said in effect "This is the place." Oppenheimer became the laboratory's first director; from 19 October 1942.

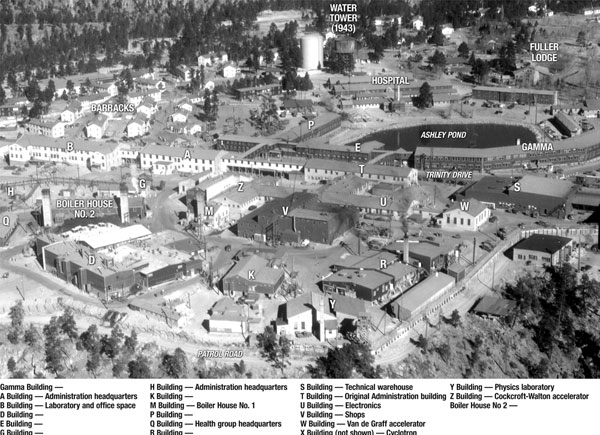
Aerial view of the original Technical Area (TA-1) in 1945

During the Manhattan Project, Los Alamos hosted thousands of employees, including many Nobel Prize-winning scientists. The location was a total secret. Its only mailing address was a post office box, number 1663, in Santa Fe, New Mexico. Eventually two other post office boxes were used, 180 and 1539, also in Santa Fe. Though its contract with the University of California was initially intended to be temporary, the relationship was maintained long after the war. Until the atomic bombings of Hiroshima and Nagasaki, Japan, University of California president Robert Sproul did not know what the purpose of the laboratory was and thought it might be producing a "death ray." The only member of the UC administration who knew its true purpose—indeed, the only one who knew its exact physical location—was the Secretary-Treasurer Robert Underhill (younger brother of Marine Corps general James Underhill and Army colonel Lewis Underhill), who was in charge of wartime contracts and liabilities. He first visited the site in mid-March 1943 and was informed of the project objective by Ernest Lawrence in November 1943.

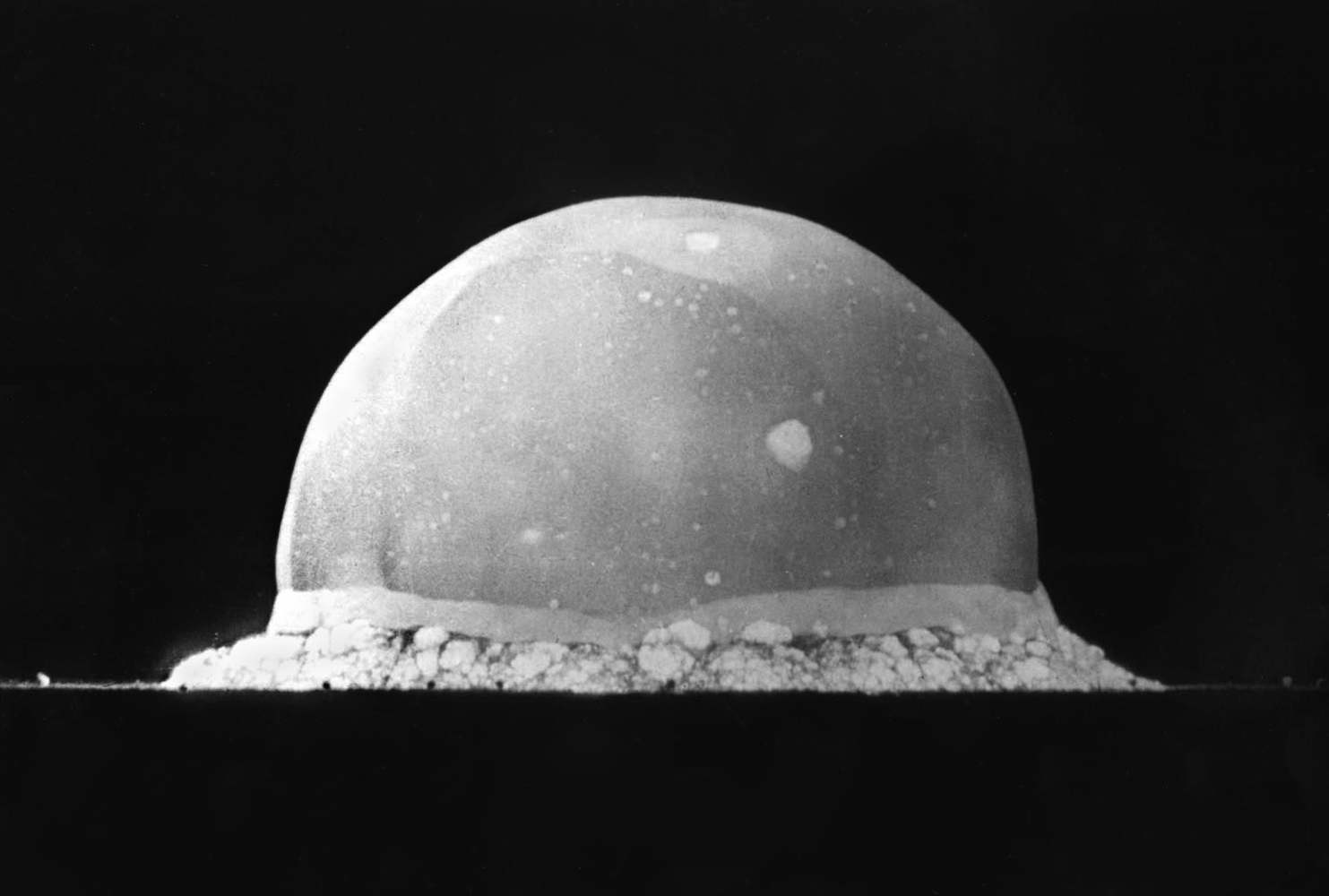
The first stages of the explosion of the Trinity nuclear test

The work of the laboratory culminated in Los Alamos assembling several atomic devices, one of which was used in the first nuclear test near Alamogordo, New Mexico, codenamed "Trinity," on July 16, 1945. The other two were weapons, "Little Boy" and "Fat Man," which were used in the attacks on Hiroshima and Nagasaki. The Laboratory received the Army-Navy "E" Award for Excellence in production on October 16, 1945.

=== Post-war ===
As the Cold War and its nuclear arms race began, Los Alamos remained central to the US effort. Under the "Super" program, Los Alamos physicists including Edward Teller and Stanisław Ulam developed of the world's first thermonuclear weapons, Greenhouse George and Ivy Mike.

After the war, Oppenheimer retired from the directorship, and it was taken over by Norris Bradbury, whose initial mission was to make the previously hand-assembled atomic bombs "G.I. proof" so that they could be mass-produced and used without the assistance of highly trained scientists. Other founding members of Los Alamos left the laboratory and became outspoken opponents to the further development of nuclear weapons.

The name officially changed to the Los Alamos Scientific Laboratory (LASL) on January 1, 1947. By this time, Argonne had already been made the first National Laboratory the previous year. Los Alamos would not become a National Laboratory in name until 1981.

In the years since the 1940s, Los Alamos was responsible for the development of the hydrogen bomb, and many other variants of nuclear weapons. In 1952, Lawrence Livermore National Laboratory was founded to act as Los Alamos' "competitor," with the hope that two laboratories for the design of nuclear weapons would spur innovation. Los Alamos and Livermore served as the primary classified laboratories in the U.S. national laboratory system, designing all the country's nuclear arsenal. Additional work included basic scientific research, particle accelerator development, health physics, and fusion power research as part of Project Sherwood. Many nuclear tests were undertaken in the Marshall Islands and at the Nevada Test Site. During the late-1950s, a number of scientists including Dr. J. Robert "Bob" Beyster left Los Alamos to work for General Atomics (GA) in San Diego.

Three major nuclear-related accidents have occurred at LANL. Criticality accidents occurred in August 1945 and May 1946, and a third accident occurred during an annual physical inventory in December 1958.

Los Alamos physicist Samuel T. Cohen is sometimes regarded as the father of the neutron bomb.

Several buildings associated with the Manhattan Project at Los Alamos were declared a National Historic Landmark in 1965.

As the demand for detailed simulation of nuclear explosions grew, Los Alamos became involved in the origins of supercomputers. Los Alamos was one of the first users of the IBM 7030 Stretch in the early 1960s, and of the Cray-1 supercomputer in 1976.

=== Post-Cold War ===
At the end of the Cold War, both labs went through a process of intense scientific diversification in their research programs to adapt to the changing political conditions that no longer required as much research towards developing new nuclear weapons and has led the lab to increase research for "non-war" science and technology. Los Alamos' nuclear work is currently thought to relate primarily to computer simulations and stockpile stewardship. The development of the Dual-Axis Radiographic Hydrodynamic Test Facility will allow complex simulations of nuclear tests to take place without full explosive yields.

The laboratory contributed to the early development of the flow cytometry technology. In the 1950s, researcher Mack Fulwyler developed a technique for sorting erythrocytes that combined the Coulter Principle of Coulter counter technologies, which measures the presence of cells and their size, with ink jet technology, which produces a laminar flow of liquid that breaks up into separate, fine drops. In 1969, Los Alamos reported the first fluorescence detector apparatus, which accurately measured the number and size of ovarian cells and blood cells.

As of 2017, other research performed at the lab included developing cheaper, cleaner biofuels and advancing scientific understanding around renewable energy.

Non-nuclear national security and defense development is also a priority at the lab. This includes preventing outbreaks of deadly diseases by improving detection tools and the monitoring the effectiveness of the United States' vaccine distribution infrastructure. Additional advancements include the ASPECT airplane that can detect bio threats from the sky.

==== Medical work ====
In 2008, development for a safer, more comfortable and accurate test for breast cancer was ongoing by scientists Lianjie Huang and Kenneth M. Hanson and collaborators. The new technique, called ultrasound-computed tomography (ultrasound CT), uses sound waves to accurately detect small tumors that traditional mammography cannot.

The lab has made intense efforts for humanitarian causes through its scientific research in medicine. In 2010, three vaccines for the Human Immunodeficiency Virus were being tested by lab scientist Bette Korber and her team. "These vaccines might finally deal a lethal blow to the AIDS virus", says Chang-Shung Tung, leader of the Lab's Theoretical Biology and Biophysics group.

==== Negative publicity ====
The laboratory has attracted negative publicity from a number of events. In 1999, Los Alamos scientist Wen Ho Lee was accused of 59 counts of mishandling classified information by downloading nuclear secrets—"weapons codes" used for computer simulations of nuclear weapons tests—to data tapes and removing them from the lab. After ten months in jail, Lee pleaded guilty to a single count of unauthorized possession of documents, but the other 58 were dismissed with an apology from U.S. District Judge James Parker for his incarceration. Lee had been suspected for having shared U.S. nuclear secrets with China, but investigators were never able to establish what Lee did with the downloaded data.

In 2000, two computer hard drives containing classified data were announced to have gone missing from a secure area within the laboratory, but were later found behind a photocopier.

== Science mission ==
Los Alamos National Laboratory's mission is to "solve national security challenges through simultaneous excellence". The laboratory's strategic plan reflects U.S. priorities spanning nuclear security, intelligence, defense, emergency response, nonproliferation, counterterrorism, energy security, emerging threats, and environmental management. This strategy is aligned with priorities set by the Department of Energy (DOE), the National Nuclear Security Administration (NNSA), and national strategy guidance documents, such as the Nuclear Posture Review, the National Security Strategy, and the Blueprint for a Secure Energy Future.

Los Alamos is the senior laboratory in the DOE system, and executes work in all areas of the DOE mission: national security, science, energy, and environmental management. The laboratory also performs work for the Department of Defense (DoD), Intelligence Community (IC), and Department of Homeland Security (DHS), among others. The laboratory's multidisciplinary scientific capabilities and activities are organized into six Capability Pillars:

- Information, Science and Technology (IS&T)
- Materials for the Future seeks to optimize materials for national security applications by predicting and controlling their performance and functionality through discovery science and engineering.
- Nuclear and Particle Futures integrates nuclear experiments, theory, and simulation to understand and engineer complex nuclear phenomena.
- Science of Signatures (SoS) applies science and technology to intransigent problems of system identification and characterization in areas of global security, nuclear defense, energy, and health.
- Complex Natural and Engineered Systems (CNES)
- Weapons Systems (WS)

Los Alamos operates three main user facilities:

1. The Center for Integrated Nanotechnologies: The Center for Integrated Nanotechnologies is a DOE/Office of Science National User Facility operated jointly by Sandia and Los Alamos National Laboratories with facilities at both Laboratories. CINT is dedicated to establishing the scientific principles that govern the design, performance, and integration of nanoscale materials into microscale and macroscale systems and devices.
2. Los Alamos Neutron Science Center (LANSCE): The Los Alamos Neutron Science Center is one of the world's most powerful linear accelerators. LANSCE provides the scientific community with intense sources of neutrons with the capability of performing experiments supporting civilian and national security research. This facility is sponsored by the Department of Energy, the National Nuclear Security Administration, Office of Science and Office of Nuclear Energy, Science and Technology.
3. The National High Magnetic Field Laboratory (NHMFL), Pulsed Field Facility: The Pulsed Field Facility at Los Alamos National Laboratory in Los Alamos, New Mexico, is one of three campuses of the National High Magnetic Field Laboratory (NHMFL), the other two being at Florida State University, Tallahassee and the University of Florida. The Pulsed Field Facility at Los Alamos National Laboratory operates an international user program for research in high magnetic fields.

As of 2017, the Los Alamos National Laboratory is using data and algorithms to possibly protect public health by tracking the growth of infectious diseases. Digital epidemiologists at the lab's Information Systems and Modeling group are using clinical surveillance data, Google search queries, census data, Wikipedia, and even tweets to create a system that could predict epidemics. The team is using data from Brazil as its model; Brazil was notably threatened by the Zika virus as it prepared to host the Summer Olympics in 2016.

== Laboratory management and operations ==
Within LANL's 35-square-mile property are approximately 2,000 dumpsites which have contaminated the environment. It also contributed to thousands of dumpsites at 108 locations in 29 US states.

=== Contract changes ===
Continuing efforts to make the laboratory more efficient led the Department of Energy to open its contract with the University of California to bids from other vendors in 2003. Though the university and the laboratory had difficult relations many times since their first World War II contract, this was the first time that the university ever had to compete for management of the laboratory. The University of California decided to create a private company with the Bechtel Corporation, Washington Group International, and the BWX Technologies to bid on the contract to operate the laboratory. The UC/Bechtel led corporation—Los Alamos National Security, LLC (LANS)—was pitted against a team formed by the University of Texas System partnered with Lockheed-Martin. In December 2005, the Department of Energy announced that LANS had won the next seven-year contract to manage and operate the laboratory.

On June 1, 2006, the University of California ended its sixty years of direct involvement in operating Los Alamos National Laboratory, and management control of the laboratory was taken over by Los Alamos National Security, LLC with effect October 1, 2007. Approximately 95% of the former 10,000 plus UC employees at LANL were rehired by LANS to continue working at LANL. Other than UC appointing three members to the eleven member board of directors that oversees LANS, UC now has virtually no responsibility or direct involvement in LANL. UC policies and regulations that apply to UC campuses and its two national laboratories in California (Lawrence Berkeley and Lawrence Livermore) no longer apply to LANL, and the LANL director no longer reports to the UC Regents or UC Office of the President.

On June 8, 2018, the NNSA announced that Triad National Security, LLC, a joint venture between Battelle Memorial Institute, the University of California, and Texas A&M University, would assume operation and management of LANL beginning November 1, 2018.

=== Safety management ===
In August 2011, the close placement of eight plutonium rods for a photo nearly led to a criticality incident. The photo shoot, which was directed by the laboratory's management, was one of several factors relating to unsafe management practices that led to the departure of 12 of the lab's 14 safety staff. The criticality incident was one of several that led the Department of Energy to seek alternative bids to manage the laboratory after the 2018 expiration of the LANS contract.

The lab was penalized with a $57 million reduction in its 2014 budget over the February 14, 2014, accident at the Waste Isolation Pilot Plant for which it was partly responsible.

In August 2017, the improper storage of plutonium metal could have triggered a criticality accident, and subsequently staff failed to declare the failure as required by procedure.

LANL surveys the air, soil, sediment, groundwater, and surface water surrounding the Laboratory to ensure that contaminants from these operations do not pose problems to workers or the public. LANL contracted with Locus Technologies to build its Intellus NM database to make the results of environmental monitoring activities accessible to the public.

Estimates vary on the number of deaths that would result if plutonium were to escape the facility. The Department of State has estimated that one kilogram escaping would result in nine deaths, however a 2026 study led by Sébastien Philippe suggests that it would result in as many as one thousand deaths.

== Extended operations ==
With support of the National Science Foundation, LANL operates one of the three National High Magnetic Field Laboratories in conjunction with and located at two other sites Florida State University in Tallahassee, Florida, and University of Florida in Gainesville, Florida.

Los Alamos National Laboratory is a partner in the Joint Genome Institute (JGI) located in Walnut Creek, California. JGI was founded in 1997 to unite the expertise and resources in genome mapping, DNA sequencing, technology development, and information sciences pioneered at the three genome centers at University of California's Lawrence Berkeley National Laboratory (LBNL), Lawrence Livermore National Laboratory (LLNL), and LANL.

The Integrated Computing Network (ICN) is a multi-security level network at the LANL integrating large host supercomputers, a file server, a batch server, a printer and graphics output server and numerous other general purpose and specialized systems. IBM Roadrunner, which was part of this network, was the first supercomputer to hit petaflop speeds.

Until 1999, LANL hosted the arXiv e-print archive. The arXiv is currently operated and funded by Cornell University.

The coreboot project was initially developed at LANL.

In the recent years, the Laboratory has developed a major research program in systems biology modeling, known at LANL under the name q-bio.

Several serials are published by LANL:

- National Security Science
- 1663
- Actinide Research Quarterly
- Physical Sciences Vistas
- The Vault

LANL also published Los Alamos Science from 1980 to 2005, as well as the Nuclear Weapons Journal, which was replaced by National Security Science after two issues in 2009.

== Controversy and criticism ==
In 2005, Congress held new hearings on lingering security issues at Los Alamos National Laboratory in New Mexico; documented problems continued to be ignored.

In November 2008, a drum containing nuclear waste was ruptured due to a 'deflagration' according to an inspector general report of the Dept. of Energy, which due to lab mistakes, also occurred in 2014 at the Waste Isolation Pilot Plant near Carlsbad, New Mexico with significant disruptions and costs across the industry.

In 2009, 69 computers which did not contain classified information were lost. The same year also saw a scare in which 1 kg (2.2 lb) of missing plutonium prompted a Department of Energy investigation into the laboratory. The investigation found that the "missing plutonium" was a result of miscalculation by LANL's statisticians and did not actually exist; but the investigation did lead to heavy criticism of the laboratory by the DOE for security flaws and weaknesses that the DOE claimed to have found.

== Institutional statistics ==
LANL is northern New Mexico's largest institution and the largest employer which had in 2025 approximately 13,200 direct employees, 330 guard force, 620 contractors, 1,800 students, 1,200 unionized craft workers, and 460 post-doctoral researchers. Additionally, there are roughly 120 DOE employees stationed at the laboratory to provide federal oversight of LANL's work and operations. Approximately one-third of the laboratory's technical staff members are physicists, one-quarter are engineers, one-sixth are chemists and materials scientists, and the remainder work in mathematics and computational science, biology, geoscience, and other disciplines. Professional scientists and students also come to Los Alamos as visitors to participate in scientific projects. The staff collaborates with universities and industry in both basic and applied research to develop resources for the future. The annual budget is approximately US$4.9 billion.

== Directors ==
The following persons served as director of the Los Alamos National Laboratory:

No.	Portrait	Director	Term start	Term end	Refs.
1		J. Robert Oppenheimer	1942	1945	
2		Norris Bradbury	1945	1970	
3		Robert Thorn (Acting)	1979, 1985		
4		Harold Agnew	1970	1979	
5		Donald Kerr	1979	1986	
6		Siegfried S. Hecker	1986	1997	
7		John C. Browne	November 3, 1997	January 5, 2003	
acting		George Peter Nanos	January 6, 2003	July 17, 2003	
8		George Peter Nanos	July 17, 2003	May 6, 2005	
Interim		Robert W. Kuckuck	May 15, 2005	May 31, 2006	
9		Michael R. Anastasio	June 1, 2006	May 31, 2011	
10		Charles F. McMillan	June 1, 2011	December 31, 2017	
11		Terry Wallace	January 1, 2018	October 31, 2018	
12		Thomas Mason	November 1, 2018	present	

== Notable scientists ==
(See also "Notable Persons" section of Los Alamos, New Mexico)

- Stirling Colgate (1925–2013)
- George Cowan (1920–2012), American physical chemist, businessman, and philanthropist
- Mitchell Feigenbaum (1944–2019)
- Richard Feynman (1918–1988)
- Bette Korber
- Tom Lehrer (1928-2025)
- Maria Goeppert Mayer (1906–1972)
- Howard O. McMahon (1914–1990), Canadian-born American electrical engineer, inventor of the Gifford-McMahon cryocooler, and the Science Director, Vice President, Head of the Research and Development Division, and then President of Arthur D. Little, Inc; lived and worked partially in Los Alamos during development of the first Hydrogen bomb
- Emily Willbanks (1930–2007)

== See also ==
- Anti-nuclear movement in the United States
- Association of Los Alamos Scientists
- Bradbury Science Museum
- Chalk River Laboratories
- Federation of American Scientists
- Clarence Max Fowler
- David Greenglass
- Ed Grothus
- Theodore Hall
- History of nuclear weapons
- Hydrogen-moderated self-regulating nuclear power module
- National Historic Landmarks in New Mexico
- National Register of Historic Places listings in Los Alamos County, New Mexico
- Julius and Ethel Rosenberg
- Timeline of Cox Report controversy
- Timeline of nuclear weapons development
- Venona project
