= Halo mass function =

In cosmology, the halo mass function is a mass distribution of dark matter halos. Specifically, it gives the number density of dark matter halos per mass interval.

== See also ==
- Navarro–Frenk–White profile
- Einasto profile
- Press–Schechter formalism
- Sheth–Tormen approximation
