= Los Alamos Science =

Journal publishing research done by the US DOE

- Title page of Vol.2, No.2, Summer/Fall 1981, on Reactor Safety
- Editor: Nikki Cooper
- Frequency: biannually
- Publisher: Los Alamos National Laboratory
- First issue: 1980 (Vol 1)
- Final issue: 2005 (Vol 30)
- Country: United States
- Language: English
- Website: https://researchlibrary.lanl.gov/about-the-library/publications/la-science/

Los Alamos Science was the Los Alamos National Laboratory's flagship publication in the years 1980 to 2005. Its main purpose was to present the laboratory's research and its significance to national security to the scientific community, and US government policymakers.

Special issues appeared on subjects such as particle physics, Stanislaw Ulam, and the Human Genome Project.

"Pedagogical articles" were intended to explain difficult concepts in one field to scientists and students in other fields.
