= Dual-Axis Radiographic Hydrodynamic Test Facility =

Coordinates: 35°50′02″N 106°18′09″W

The Dual-Axis Radiographic Hydrodynamic Test Facility (DARHT) is a facility at Los Alamos National Laboratory which is part of the Department of Energy's stockpile stewardship program. It uses two large X-ray machines to record three-dimensional interior images of materials. In most experiments, materials undergo hydrodynamic shock to simulate the implosion process in nuclear bombs and/or the effects of severe hydrodynamic stress. The tests are described as "full-scale mockups of the events that trigger the nuclear detonation". The powerful pulsed X-ray beams allow for an ultra-fast motion picture to be constructed showing the details of the process being studied in three dimensions. The tests are compared with computer simulations to help improve the accuracy of the computer codes.

== History ==
Planning for DARHT began in the early 1980s. Based upon the success of Livermore's Flash X-Ray (FXR), induction-linac facility, in 1987 Los Alamos chose the same type of accelerator to replace PHERMEX, an radiofrequency (RF) accelerator commissioned in 1963.

The project became an important priority after the United States stopped testing nuclear weapons in 1992. Approval for an overhaul and new axis came in stages, with the first axis approved for construction in 1992 and the second axis (initially to be a twin of the first) in 1997. This plan was changed when the Department of Energy decided it wanted the second axis to deliver not one view of the implosion, but a series of views in rapid succession.

Construction was halted between 1995 and 1996 due to lawsuits by Los Alamos Study Group and Concerned Citizens for Nuclear Safety, two anti-nuclear weapons organizations demanding that the laboratory produce an Environmental Impact Statement for its construction and operation. Activists argued that DARHT is in violation of the Comprehensive Test Ban Treaty and potentially the Nuclear Non-Proliferation Treaty, though the lab and the DOE reject this view.

When completed in 1999, the first-axis accelerator produced a 60ns electron pulse with a current of 2 kA and an energy of 20 MeV focused to 1mm diameter spot on the target - the smallest spot size and shortest pulse length ever achieved at that intensity. As a result, image quality was about three times higher than at Livermore's FXR facility.

The second machine (second axis) is more complicated and, when first completed in 2003, was found to be unusable due to electrical breakdown. The origin of the electrical breakdown turned out to be unexpectedly high electric fields between the high-voltage plate and the oil-insulated magnetic cores and at sites where metal, high-voltage insulator, and vacuum meet inside the cells. After much analysis, the design error was tracked to faulty equipment used when doing voltage calibrations.

An extensive design overhaul and rebuild was required, which was completed in 2008. The project was initially expected to cost $30 million in 1988, but costs ultimately rose to $350 million by 2008 when the facility became completely operational.

== Description ==
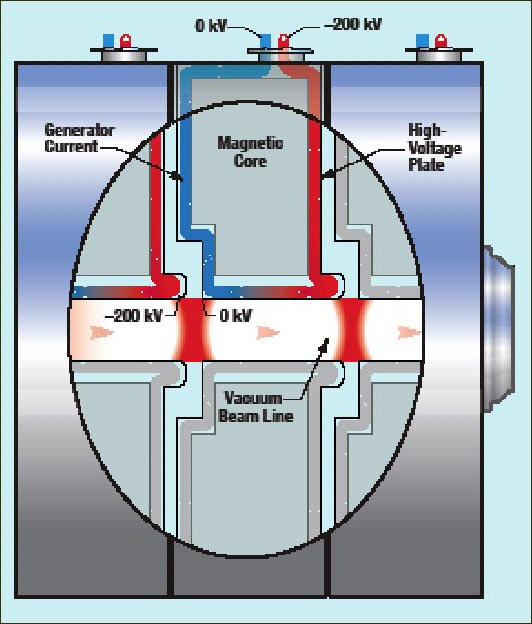
Linear induction accelerator schematic

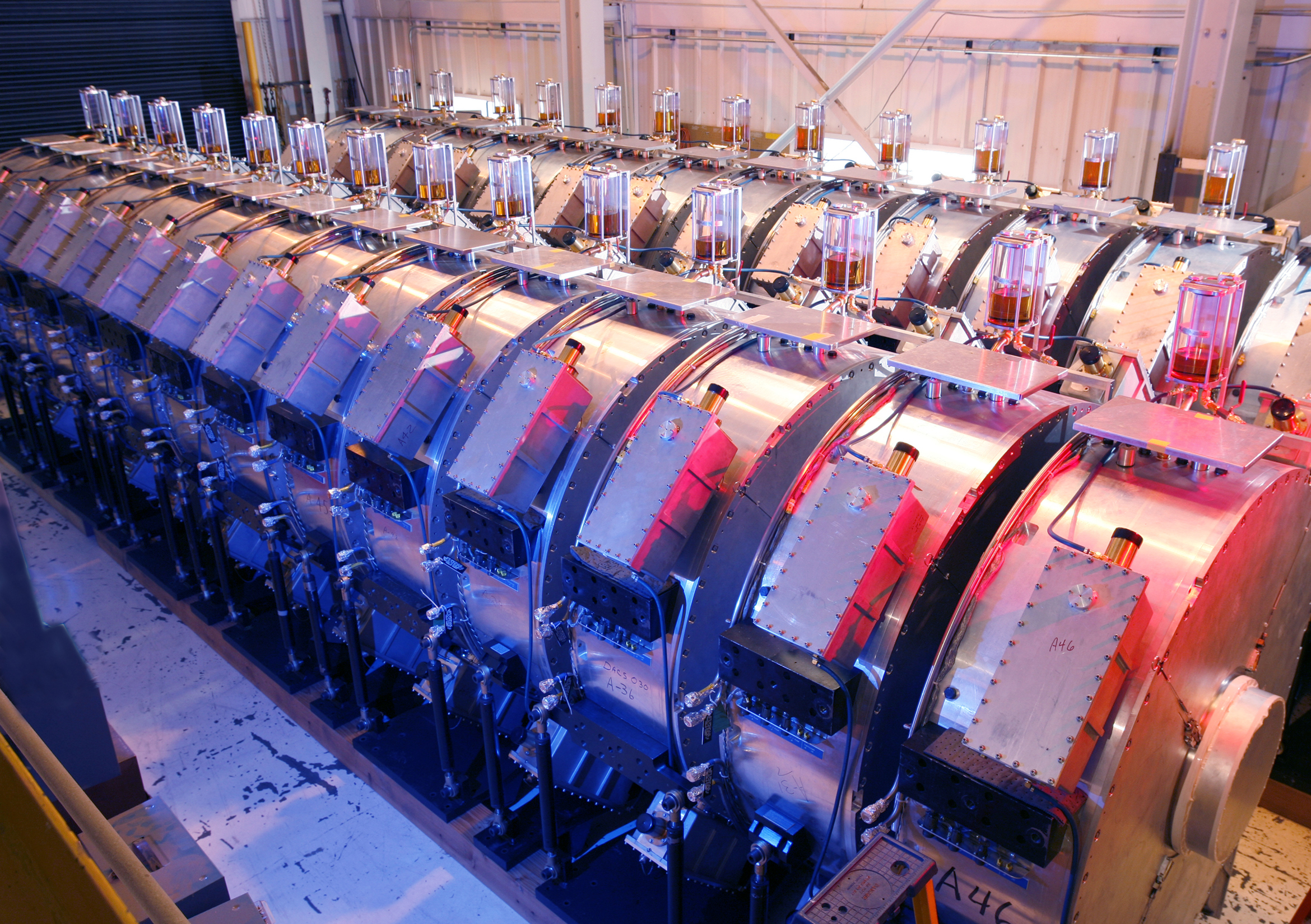
The 2nd, refurbished accelerator

During a weapon's crucial triggering phase, explosive charges that surround the nuclear fuel are detonated at multiple points. The result is a shock wave that moves inward (implosion) at supersonic speeds, compressing the fuel to higher and higher density. Implosion ends when the fuel reaches a supercritical density, the density at which nuclear reactions in the fuel build up an uncontainable amount of energy, which is then released in a massive explosion. To make the mockup non-nuclear, a heavy metal surrogate (such as depleted uranium or lead) stands in for the nuclear fuel, but all other components can be exact replicas. Sub-critical masses of plutonium may also be used.

Under such extreme implosion forces materials tend to behave like fluids, so this mock implosion is called a hydrodynamic test, or hydrotest. Standard practice is to take a single stop-action snapshot of the weapon mockup's interior as the molten components rush inward at thousands of meters per second.

X-rays that can penetrate the heavy metal in a weapon mockup are made with an electron accelerator. An electron beam moving at near the speed of light is smashed into a tungsten target. The electrons are yanked off course by the strong electrostatic pull of the positively charged nuclei in the tungsten atoms, and their sudden change in direction causes them to give off energy in the form of high-energy x-rays in a process called bremsstrahlung.

Scientists already knew how to use a short burst (pulse) of high-energy electrons (rather than a continuous beam) to make a short pulse of high-energy x-rays recorded on conventional x-Ray films. The new challenge was for the accelerator to deliver a very large number of electrons in an extremely powerful pulse to generate an x-ray flash that can penetrate the mockup during the ultra-dense implosion. Specifications call for a pulse width of 60 billionths of a second.

Each electron accelerator consists of a long row of doughnut-shaped magnetic induction cells, each connected to a high-voltage generator. There are 74 in total in each accelerator but not all may be used. At the instant of firing, each generator discharges its power, creating a pulse of electric current through its induction cell, which in turn creates a large voltage difference across the gap separating that cell from its neighbor. The electron beam-pulse travels through the central bore of the cells, receiving a 200 keV energy kick each time it passes through a gap.

One of the problems was designing the new induction cores to fit in the confines of the previous facility. The design team had to replace the ferrite used in the first axis cores with "metglas"—paper-thin ribbons of amorphous iron tape. The maximum magnetic field strength (saturation point) in metglas is five times higher than in ferrite. The magnetic tape was insulated by thin layers of mylar and wound up into a roll of 20,000 turns to make mammoth six-foot-diameter cores, each four inches wide and weighing more than one and a half tons. Four cores fit into each induction cell.

Perhaps the most significant technical advance achieved at the DARHT facility are the high-speed cameras used to image x-rays on the second axis. These cameras utilizes the world's largest LSO crystal array to convert the x-rays into visible light which are then imaged with the world's highest speed CCDs (developed jointly by MIT and Los Alamos) at more than two million frames per second. These scintillation cameras are further augmented by a large anti-scatter (“Bucky”) grid to improve image contrast. The unique combination of diagnostics solves technical surveillance problems that have persisted since the Manhattan Project enabling the United States to assert higher confidence in its nuclear stockpile performance and safety margins without the need for nuclear testing.

== Images ==
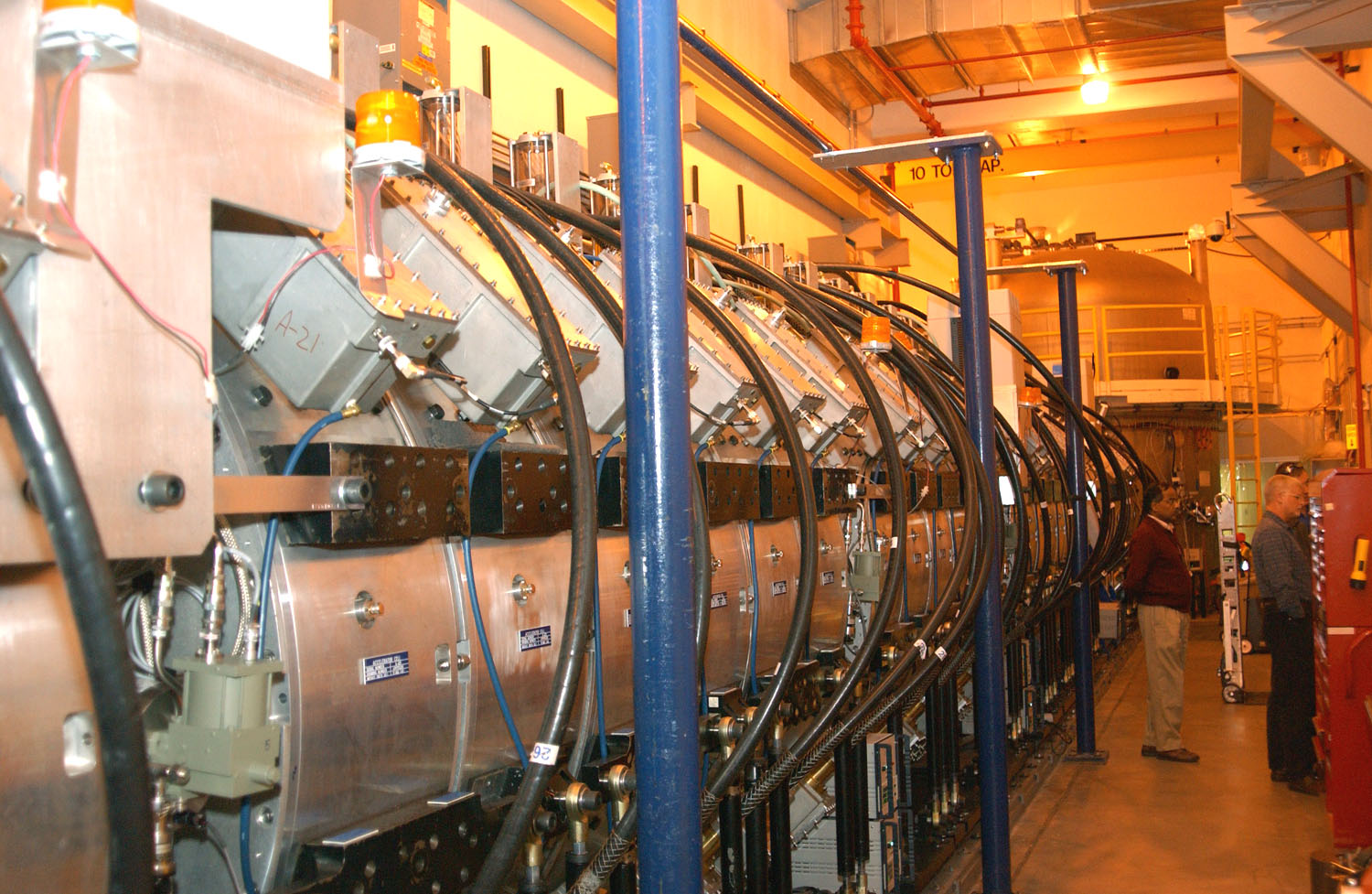
DARHT electron accelerator

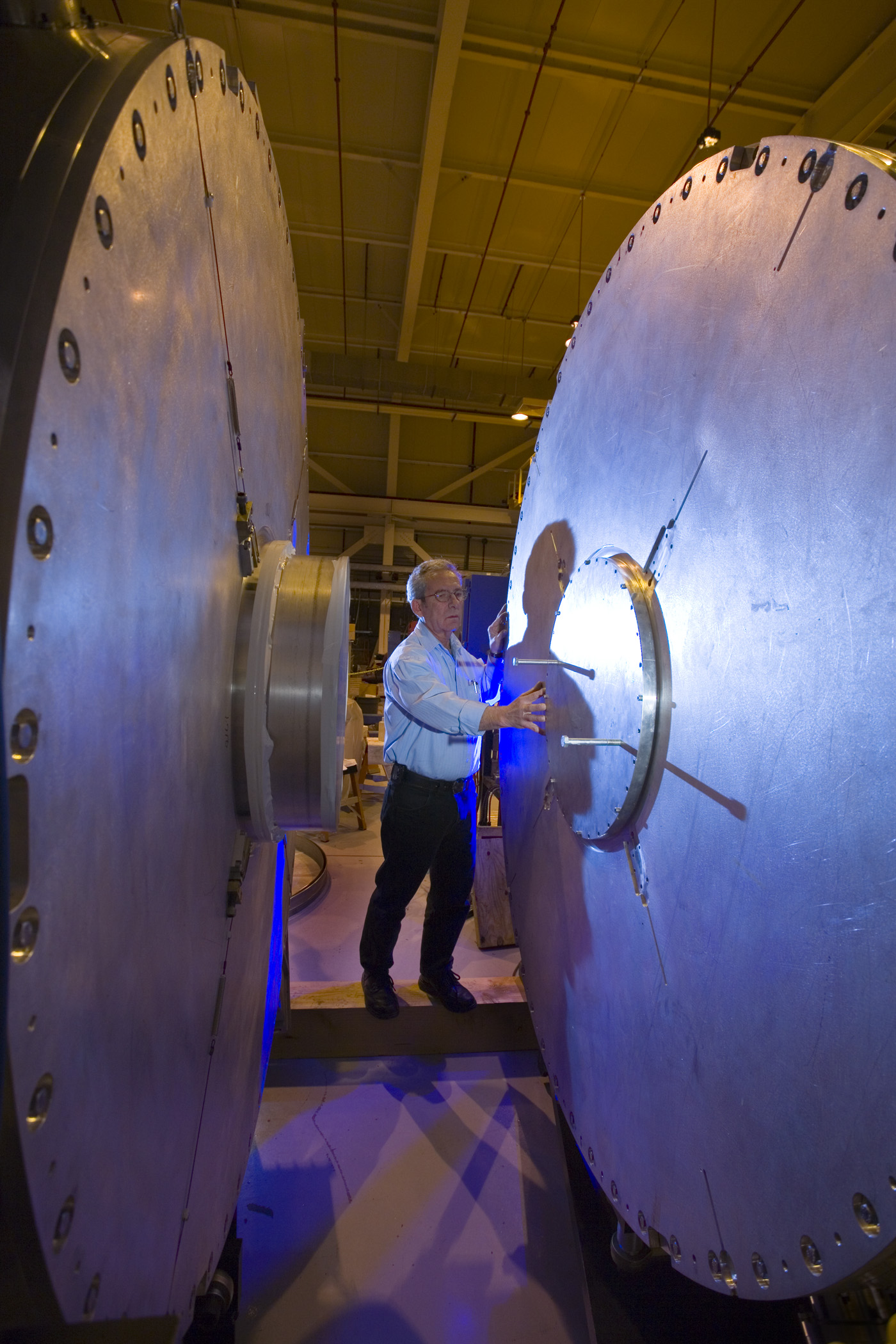
A technician examining one of the refurbished accelerator cells for DARHT's second-axis accelerator.
