= BWX Technologies =

American industrial company

BWX Technologies, Inc.
- Type: Public
- Traded as: NYSE: BWXT; S&P 400 Component
- Industry: Nuclear Industry
- Founded: 1867; 159 years ago
- Founders: Stephen Wilcox; George Herman Babcock
- Headquarters: Lynchburg, Virginia, United States
- Area served: Worldwide
- Key people: Rex D. Geveden (CEO)
- Products: Commercial Nuclear Services; Heavy Nuclear Components; Government Services
- Revenue: ▲US$3.20 billion (2025)
- Net income: ▲US$329 million (2025)
- Number of employees: 7,800 (2023)
- Website: www.bwxt.com

BWX Technologies, Inc. is an American company headquartered in Lynchburg, Virginia that supplies nuclear components and fuel internationally.

== Overview ==
On July 1, 2015, BWX Technologies Inc. began trading separately from its former subsidiary Babcock & Wilcox Enterprises Inc. after a spinoff. Sandy Baker became CEO and Fees became chairman. The company had 2,500 employees in Lynchburg and 4,500 in total.

After Babcock & Wilcox emerged from bankruptcy in 2006, that company and BWX Technologies (both subsidiaries of McDermott International, Inc.) consolidated operations as The Babcock & Wilcox Companies headed by President John Fees.

Before a move to Charlotte, North Carolina, it was headquartered in Lynchburg, Virginia, with offices in the downtown district of the city.

== Business units ==
=== BWXT mPower, Inc. ===
BWXT announced in 2009 plans to design, develop, license and deploy a small modular nuclear reactor (SMR) called the BWXT mPower reactor. The passively safe reactor would have had an output of 180 megawatts (electric) and was one of several SMRs investigated by U.S. engineering firms. The mPower reactor featured a fully underground containment structure.

BWXT mPower, Inc. was formed in 2012 to design, develop, license, and deploy the B&W mPower reactor, a small modular nuclear reactor. The BWXT mPower reactor – no longer in development as of 2017 – was a scalable, modular reactor with the capacity to provide output in increments of 180 MWe for a four-year operating cycle without refueling. The business unit was headquartered in Charlotte, NC.

The reactor design was an integral Pressurized Water Reactor (iPWR) system in which the nuclear core and steam generators were contained within a single vessel.

B&W and engineering and construction firm Bechtel maintained an alliance called Generation mPower LLC to produce modular nuclear power plants using the BWXT mPower reactor until the project was terminated in 2017.

More than two dozen utilities belonged to the Generation mPower Industry Advisory Council and provided review, insights and feedback regarding licensing and design activities for the BWXT mPower reactor. In 2013 the Tennessee Valley Authority signed a letter of intent to potentially build plants utilizing BWXT mPower reactors.

=== BWXT Nuclear Energy, Inc. ===
BWXT Nuclear Energy, Inc. (BWXT NE) manufactures nuclear components and provides engineering, design, construction, inspection and repair services. It was formed in 2010, named Babcock & Wilcox Nuclear Energy, by the merger of two business units, Nuclear Power Generation Group and Modular Nuclear Energy. This company was later renamed BWXT NE following the July 2015 spin-off of Babcock & Wilcox. BWXT is the only North American company to continuously manufacture nuclear steam generators for the commercial nuclear power industry since the 1950s. BWXT NE's headquarters are located in Charlotte, NC.

=== BWXT Nuclear Operations Group, Inc. ===
BWXT Nuclear Operations Group, Inc. (BWXT NOG) specializes in the design and manufacture of components for the U.S. government.

BWXT NOG's headquarters are located in Lynchburg. BWXT NOG has four operating locations throughout the United States. BWXT NOG's Barberton, Ohio, and Mount Vernon, Indiana, locations specialize in the design and manufacture of large, heavy components. BWXT NOG facilities in Lynchburg, Virginia, and Euclid, Ohio, design and supply components for United States government programs.

Nuclear Fuel Services, Inc. (NFS) is a subsidiary of BWXT NOG, located in Erwin, Tennessee.

=== BWXT Technical Services Group, Inc. ===
BWXT Technical Services Group, Inc. (BWXT TSG) manages complex, high-consequence nuclear and national security operations, including nuclear production facilities. BWXT TSG manages the nation's Strategic Petroleum Reserve and provides a broad range of technical services to the U.S. Department of Energy and the National Nuclear Security Administration's operations.

Headquartered in Lynchburg, BWXT TSG operates three businesses: managing and operating large manufacturing or site closure contracts for the U.S. government, facilitating laboratory services and managing technical services. BWXT TSG is a member of the Los Alamos National Security, LLC and Lawrence Livermore National Security, LLC (LLNS), the latter of which was awarded the Management & Operation (M&O) contract to operate Lawrence Livermore National Laboratory, on May 8, 2007, to commence on October 1, 2007.
