= Press–Schechter formalism =

Mathematical model

The Press–Schechter formalism is a mathematical model for predicting the number of objects (such as galaxies, galaxy clusters or dark matter halos) of a certain mass within a given volume of the Universe. It was described in an academic paper by William H. Press and Paul Schechter in 1974.

== Background ==
In the context of cold dark matter cosmological models, perturbations on all scales are imprinted on the universe at very early times, for example by quantum fluctuations during an inflationary era. Later, as radiation redshifts away, these become mass perturbations, and they start to grow linearly. Only long after that, starting with small mass scales and advancing over time to larger mass scales, do the perturbations actually collapse to form (for example) galaxies or clusters of galaxies, in so-called hierarchical structure formation (see Physical cosmology).

Press and Schechter observed that the fraction of mass in collapsed objects more massive than some mass M is related to the fraction of volume samples in which the smoothed initial density fluctuations are above some density threshold. This yields a formula for the mass function (distribution of masses) of objects at any given time.

== Result ==
The Press–Schechter formalism predicts that the number of objects with mass between $M$ and $M+dM$ is:
$$dn\equiv N(M)dM = \frac{1}{\sqrt{\pi}} \left(1+\frac{n}{3}\right)\frac{\bar{\rho}}{M^2} \left(\frac{M}{M^*}\right)^{\left(3+n\right)/6} \exp\left(-\left(\frac{M}{M^*}\right)^{\left(3+n\right)/3}\right) dM$$

where $n$ is the index of the power spectrum of the fluctuations in the early universe $P(k)\propto k^n$, $\bar{\rho}$ is the mean (baryonic and dark) matter density of the universe at the time the fluctuation from which the object was formed had gravitationally collapsed, and $M^*$ is a cut-off mass below which structures will form. Its value is:

$$M^* = \left(\frac{\bar{\rho}^{1-\frac{n}{3}}}{2\sigma^2}\right)^{\frac{3}{3+n}} = \left(\frac{\bar{\rho}_0^{1-\frac{n}{3}}}{2\sigma_0^2}\right)^{\frac{3}{3+n}}\cdot\frac{R_0^2}{R^2}$$

$\sigma$ is the standard deviation per unit volume of the fluctuation from which the object was formed had gravitationally collapsed, at the time of the gravitational collapse, and R is the scale of the universe at that time. Parameters with subscript 0 are at the time of the initial creation of the fluctuations (or any later time before the gravitational collapse).

Qualitatively, the prediction is that the mass distribution is a power law for small masses, with an exponential cutoff above some characteristic mass that increases with time. Such functions had previously been noted by Schechter as observed luminosity functions, and are now known as Schechter luminosity functions. The Press-Schechter formalism provided the first quantitative model for how such functions might arise.

The case of a scale-free power spectrum, n=0 (or, equivalently, a scalar spectral index of 1), is very close to the spectrum of the current standard cosmological model. In this case, $dn$ has a simpler form. Written in mass-free units:

$$M \frac{dn}{dM} = \frac{1}{\sqrt{\pi}} \frac{\bar{\rho}}{M} \left(\frac{M}{M^*}\right)^{1/2} e^{-M/M^*}$$

== Assumptions and derivation sketch ==
The Press–Schechter formalism is derived through three key assumptions:

1. Matter in the Universe has perturbations $\delta$ following a Gaussian distribution and the variance of this distribution is scale-dependent, given by the power spectrum $P(k)$
2. Matter perturbations grow linearly with the growth function $\delta \propto D_+$
3. Halos are spherical, virialized overdensities with a density above a critical density $\delta \geq \delta_c$

In other words, fluctuations are small at some early cosmological time, and grow until they cross a threshold ending in gravitational collapse into a halo. These perturbations are modeled linearly, even though the eventual collapse is itself a non-linear process.

We introduce the smoothed density field $\delta_M(\vec x)~,$ given by $\delta(\vec x)$ averaged over a sphere with center $\vec x$ and mass $M$ contained inside (i.e., $\delta$ is convolved with a top-hat window function). The sphere radius is of order $M \sim \bar \rho R^3~.$ Then if $\delta_M(\vec x) \geq \delta_c~,$ a halo exists at $\vec x$ with mass at least $M~.$

Since perturbations $\delta_M$ are Gaussian distributed with an average 0 and variance $\sigma(M)~,$ we can directly compute the probability of halos forming with masses at least $M$ as
$$f(\delta_M>\delta_c)
= \int_{\delta_c}^\infty d\delta_M ~ \frac{1}{\sqrt{2\pi}\sigma(M)} \exp\left(-\frac{1}{2}\frac{\delta_M^2}{\sigma^2(M)}\right)
= \frac{1}{2}\operatorname{erfc}\left(\frac{1}{\sqrt{2}}\frac{\delta_c}{\sigma(M)}\right) ~.$$

Implicitly, $\sigma(R)$ and $\delta_M$ depend on redshift, so the above probability does as well. The variance given in the 1974 paper is
$$\sigma(M)^2 = \frac{\Sigma^2}{M^2} = \frac{V\cdot \sigma^2}{M^2} = \frac{\sigma^2}{M\cdot\rho}$$
where $\Sigma$ is the mass standard deviation in the volume of the fluctuation.

Note, that in the limit of large perturbations $\sigma(M) \gg \delta_M~,$ we expect all matter to be contained in halos such that $f(\delta_M>\delta_c) = 1~.$ However, the above equation gives us the limit $f(\delta_M>\delta_c) = \frac{1}{2}~.$ One can make an ad-hoc argument and say that negative perturbations are not contributing in this scheme so that we are mistakenly leaving out half of the mass. And so, the Press-Schechter ansatz is
$$F(>M) = \operatorname{erfc}\left(\frac{1}{\sqrt{2}}\frac{\delta_M}{\sigma(M)}\right)~,$$

the fraction of matter contained in halos of mass $> M~.$

A fractional fluctuation $\delta$; at some cosmological time reaches gravitational collapse after the universe has expanded by a factor of 1/δ since that time. Using this, the normal distribution of the fluctuations, written in terms of the $M$, $\rho$, and $\sigma$ gives the Press-Schechter formula.

== Generalizations ==
A number of generalizations of the Press–Schechter formula exist, such as the Sheth–Tormen approximation.
