= Stockpile stewardship =

Testing and maintenance of American nuclear weapons

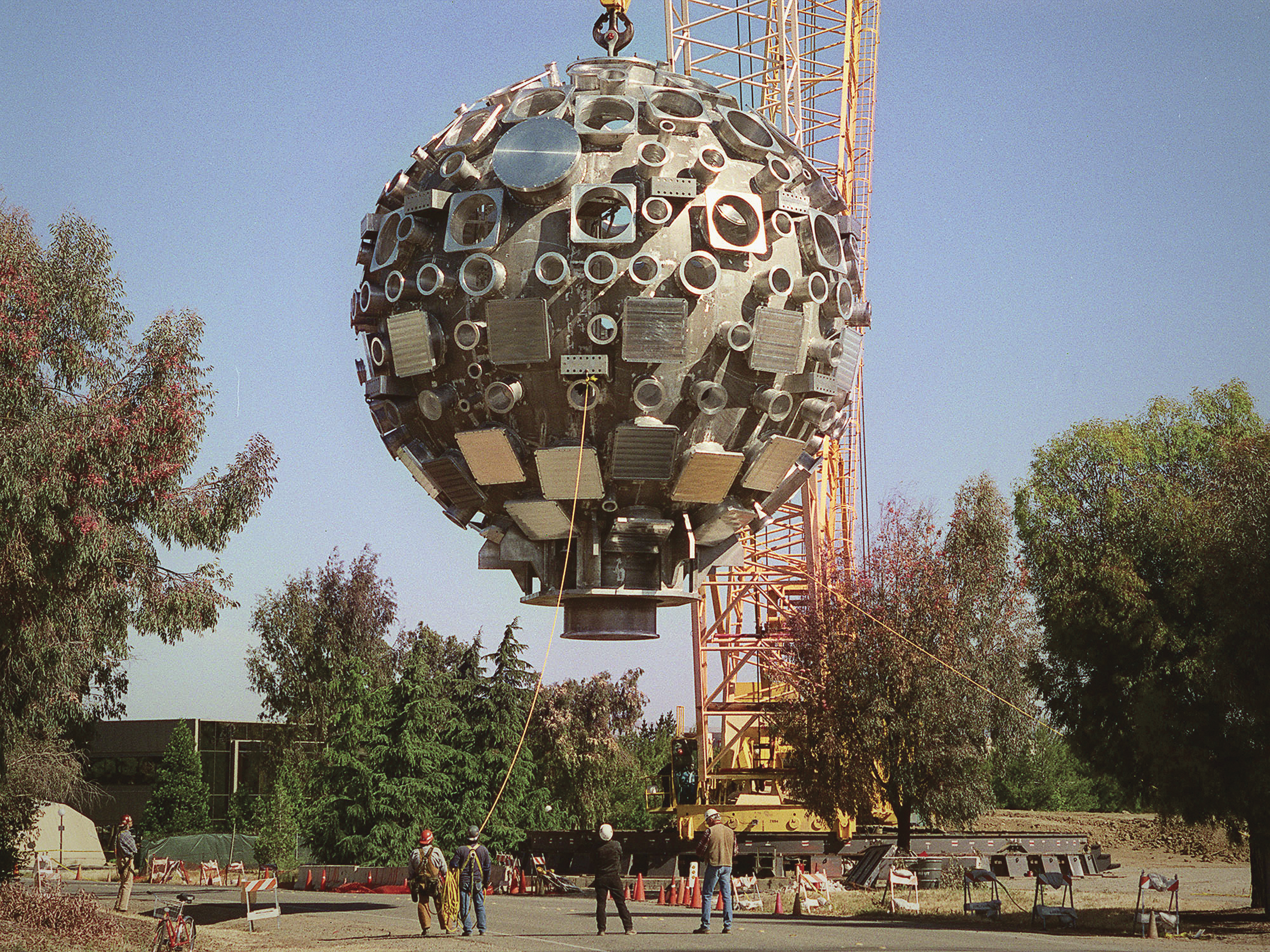
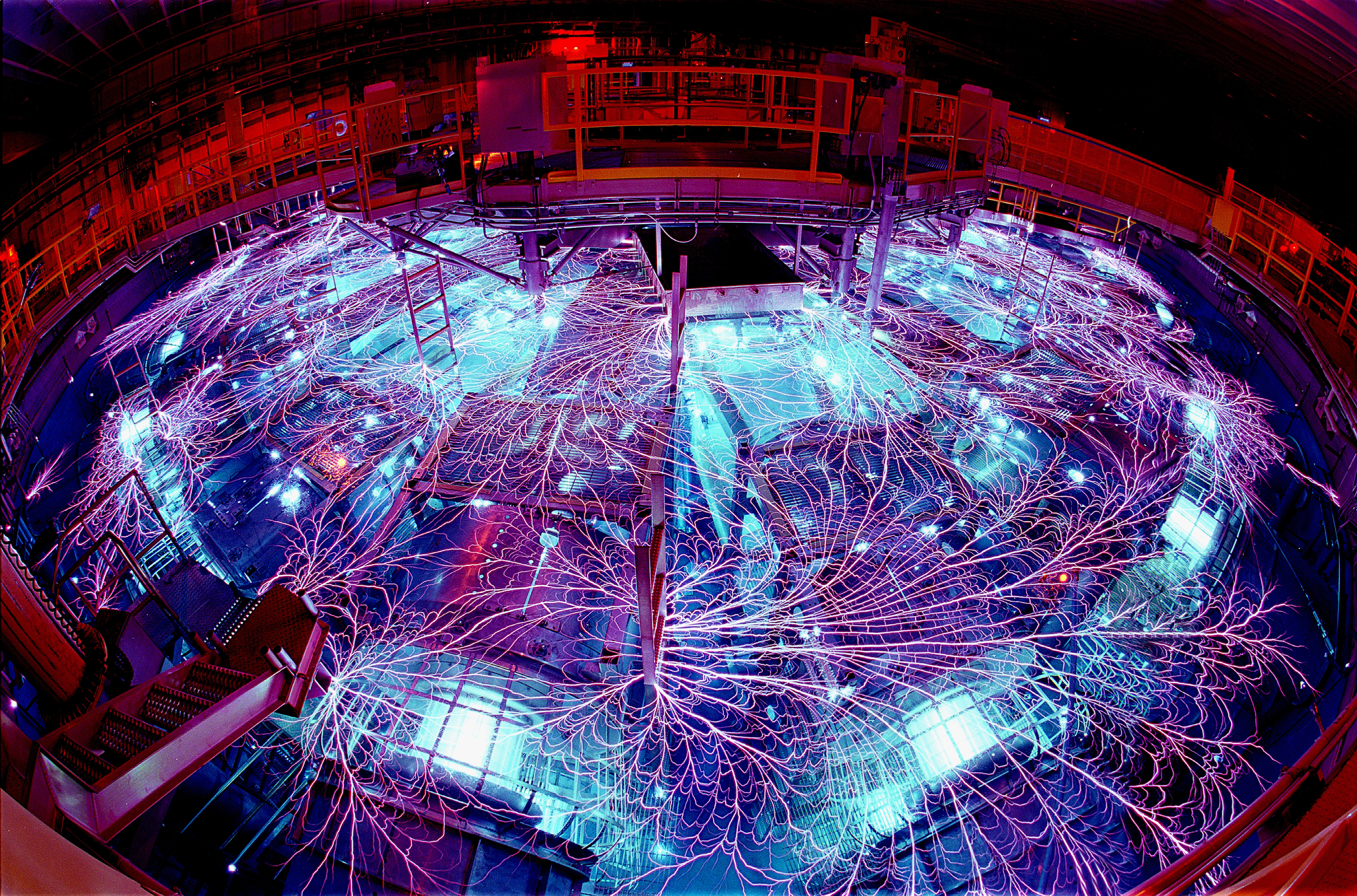
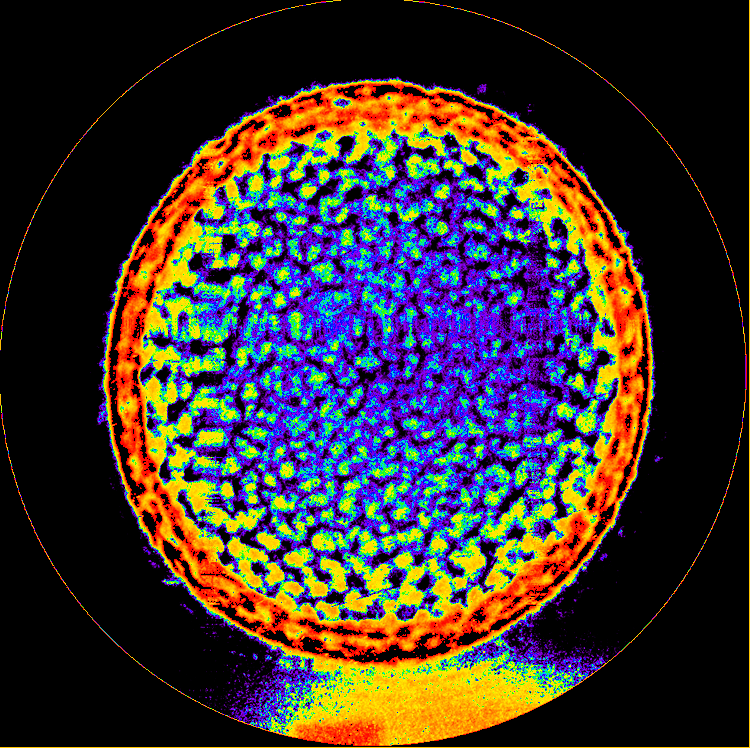
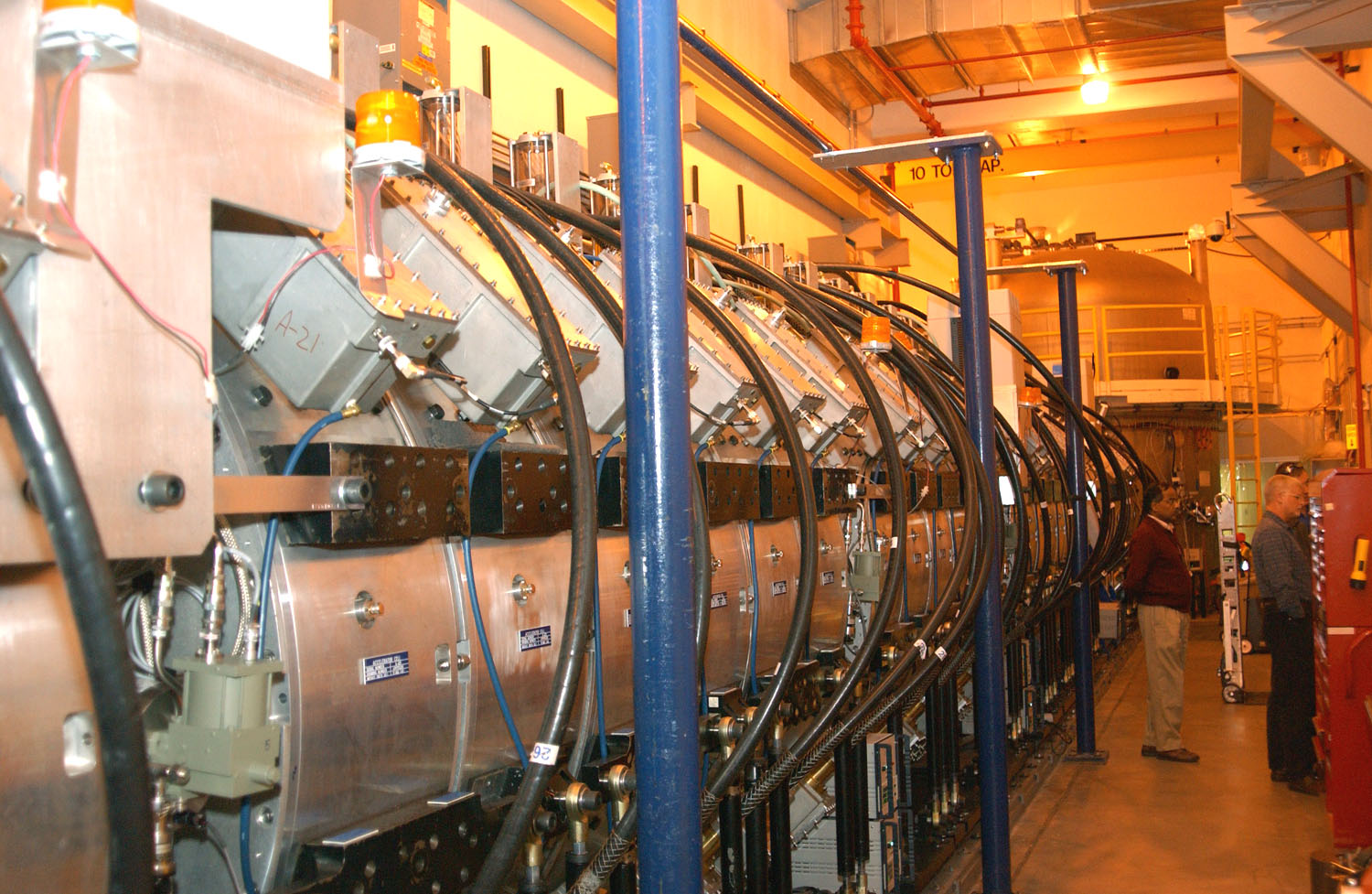
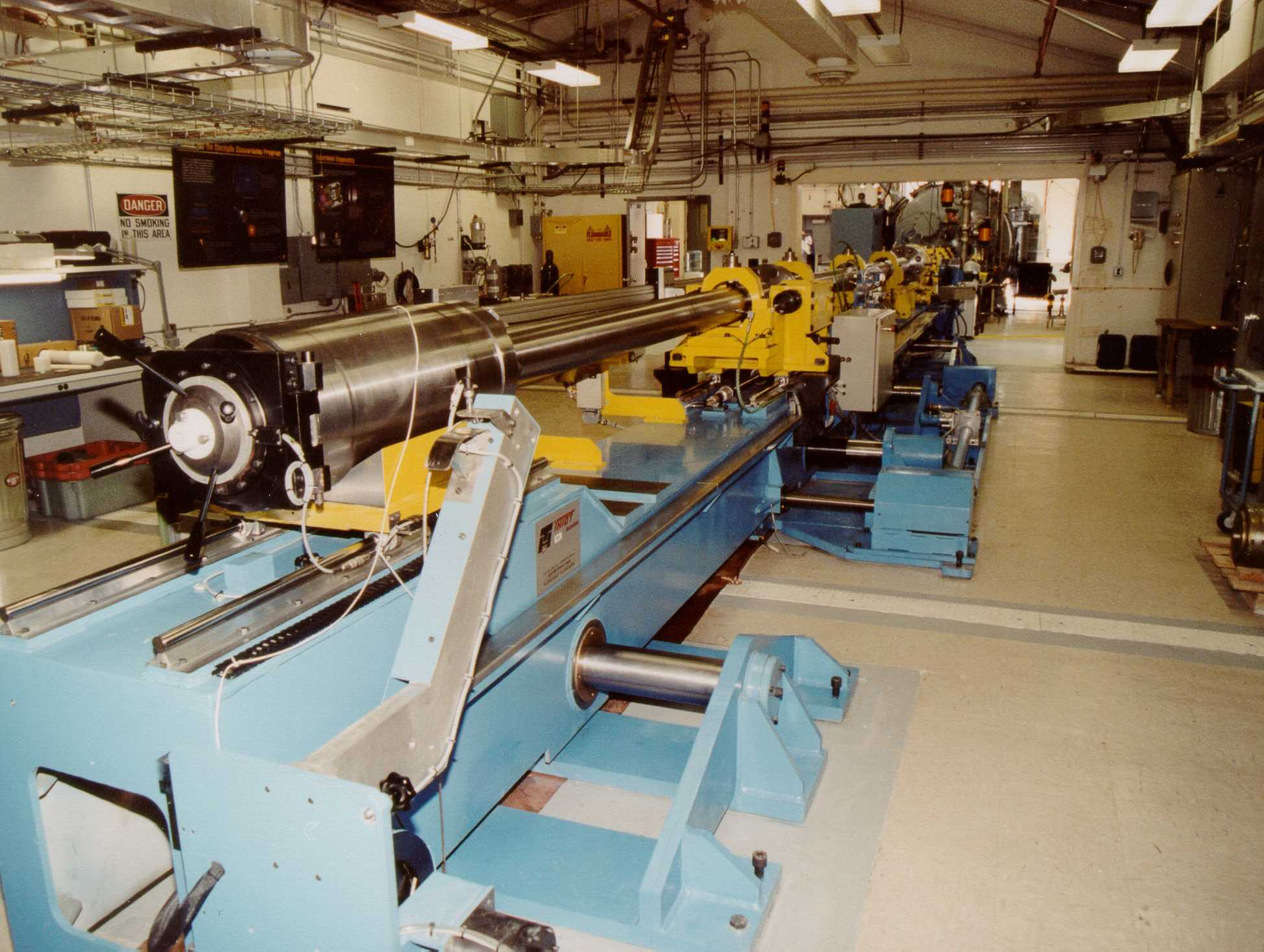
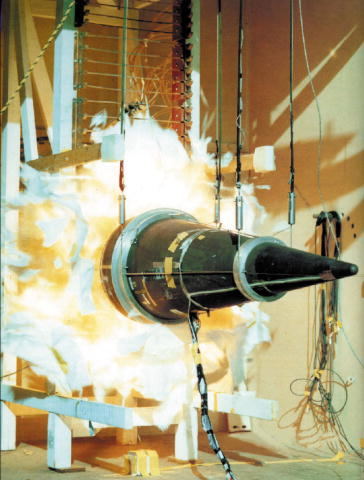
From top, left to right
1. Installation of the NIF target chamber for laser-driven implosions
2. Z Pulsed Power Facility for current-driven implosions
3. LANSCE proton radiography of a uranium alloy
4. DARHT X-ray accelerator for implosion imaging
5. JASPER light gas gun for shock testing
6. A Mk. 21 reentry vehicle subjected to a wall of fire to determine aging

Stockpile stewardship refers to the United States program of reliability testing, viability, certification, and the maintenance of its nuclear weapons without the use of nuclear testing.

Because no new nuclear weapons have been developed by the United States since 1992, even its youngest weapons are at least 33 years old (as of 2026). Aging weapons can fail or act unpredictably in a number of ways: the high explosives that compress their fissile material can chemically degrade, their electronic components can suffer from decay, their radioactive plutonium/uranium cores are potentially unreliable, and the isotopes used by thermonuclear weapons may be chemically unstable as well.

Since the United States has also not tested nuclear weapons since 1992, this leaves the task of its stockpile maintenance resting on the use of simulations (using non-nuclear explosives tests and supercomputers, among other methods) and applications of scientific knowledge about physics and chemistry to the specific problems of weapons aging (the latter method is what is meant when various agencies refer to their work as "science-based"). It also involves the manufacture of additional plutonium "pits" to replace ones of unknown quality, and finding other methods to increase the lifespan of existing warheads and maintain a credible nuclear deterrent.

Most work for stockpile stewardship is undertaken at United States Department of Energy national laboratories, mostly at Los Alamos National Laboratory (LANL), Sandia National Laboratories (SNL), Lawrence Livermore National Laboratory (LLNL), the Nevada Test Site (NTS), and the Department of Energy's other productions facilities, which employ around 27,500 personnel and cost billions of dollars per year to operate.

== Stockpile Stewardship and Management Program ==
The Science-based Stockpile Stewardship (SBSS) is a program managed and overseen by the United States's Department of Energy (DoE) to ensure that the nuclear weapons capabilities of the United States are not eroded as nuclear weapons age. It costs more than $4 billion annually to test the components of the nuclear weapons and build advanced science facilities, such as the National Ignition Facility (NIF) at the Livermore (California) and the Z-Pulsed Power Facility at the Sandia (New Mexico). Such facilities have been deemed necessary under the program since President Bill Clinton signed the Comprehensive Test Ban Treaty (CTBT) in 1996, but the United States Senate never ratified the CTBT.

Later, President Barack Obama initiated a wide range and a broad effort to modernize the United States nuclear weapons program, which the Congressional Budget Office estimates will require approximately $494 billion to complete.

=== Facilities ===
The stockpile stewardship program is supported by the following experimental facilities:

- Lawrence Livermore National Laboratory in California
  - National Ignition Facility
  - Contained Firing Facility
  - High Explosive Application Facility,
- Nevada Test Site in Nevada
  - Joint Actinide Shock Physics Experimental Research Facility (JASPER)
  - Principal Underground Laboratory for Subcritical Experimentation Facility (PULSE)
  - Big Explosives Experimental Facility (BEEF)
- Los Alamos National Laboratory in New Mexico
  - Dual-Axis Radiographic Hydrodynamic Test Facility (DARHT)
  - Los Alamos Neutron Science Center (LANSCE)
  - Proton Radiography Facility
- Sandia National Laboratories in New Mexico
  - Z-Pulsed Power Facility
  - Explosives Components Facility
  - Ion Beam Laboratory
- Other facilities in nuclear weapons research.
  - Pantex in Texas
  - Kansas City National Security Campus
  - Oak Ridge National Laboratory in Tennessee. (to some extent)
  - Idaho National Laboratory in Idaho. (to some extent)

The data produced by the experiments carried out in these facilities is used in combination with the Advanced Simulation and Computing Program.

== See also ==
- Enduring Stockpile
