= Area 27 (Nevada National Security Site) =

Area of the Nevada National Security Site, US

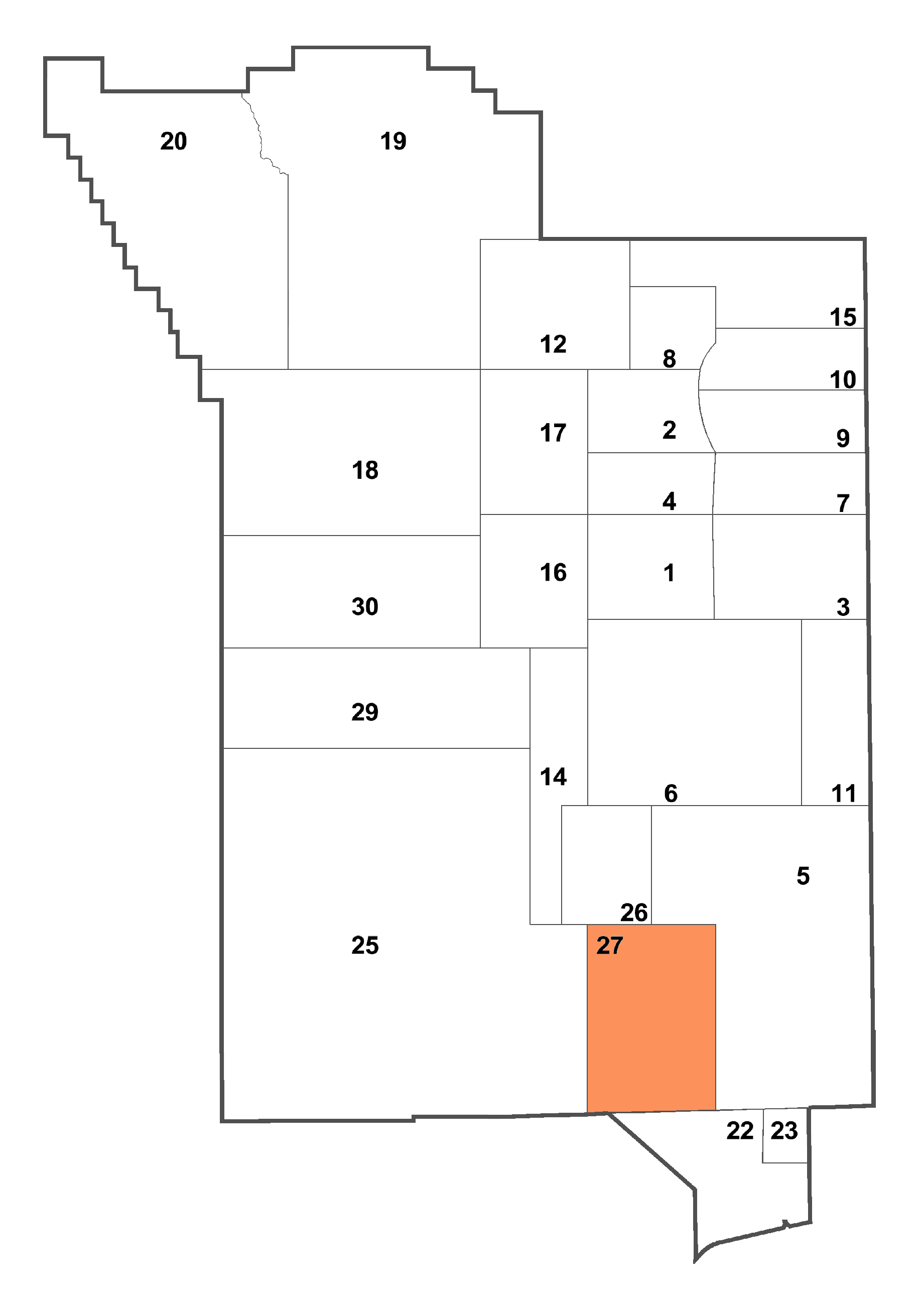
Area 27 within the Nevada National Security Site.

Area 27 is a division of the Nevada National Security Site. It occupies approximately 49 square miles (130 km^{2}) in the south-central portion of the NNSS. A portion of Area 27 was originally known as Area 410.

No tests of nuclear weapons took place in Area 27.

== History ==
Area 27 was used for weapons assembly and staging.

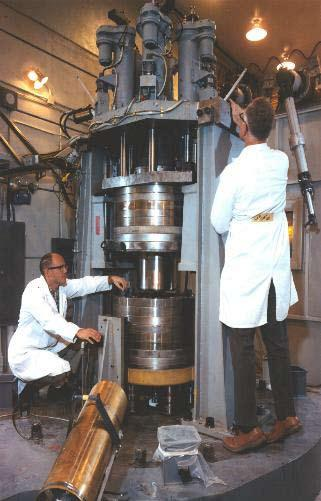
Super Kukla reactor being prepared for a test

The Super Kukla Reactor Facility was built in Area 27 and operated from 1965 to 1978. A major U.S. concern in the Cold War was Soviet use of defensive tactical nuclear weapons. Nuclear-armed interceptors and anti-ballistic missiles could be used to intercept a U.S. attack. To simulate nearby nuclear explosions, the Super Kukla reactor produced an ultrahigh burst of prompt critical neutrons and gamma rays. This could be used to test the effects on weapons hardware. Super Kukla is now entombed in place at Area 27.

== Joint Actinide Shock Physics Experimental Research ==
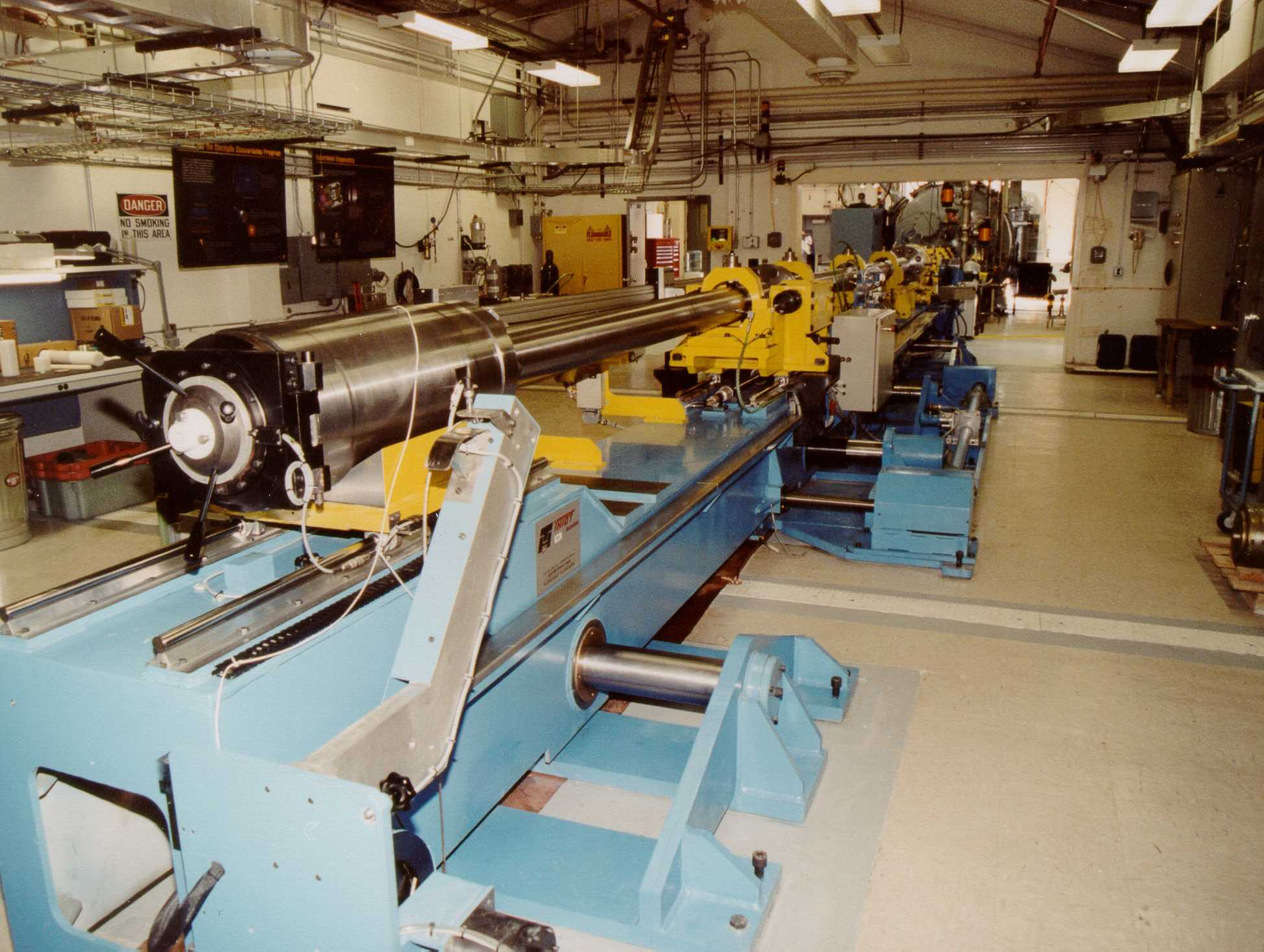
The JASPER two-stage gun in Area 27

Area 27 is home to the Joint Actinide Shock Physics Experimental Research (JASPER) Facility.

JASPER uses a two-stage high-energy shock gun to achieve shock pressures, temperatures, and strain rates similar to those attained in a nuclear weapon. It is specifically designed to conduct research using plutonium and surrogate materials as targets. Data from these experiments is used to determine material equations of state and to validate computer models of material response for weapons applications. JASPER experiments support the Stockpile Stewardship Program and complement subcritical experiments conducted in Area 1.

The facility is located in a decommissioned weapons assembly complex and was established in 1999. By April 2003, qualification testing using non-nuclear materials was complete. By May 2007, a series of tests comparing new plutonium weapons pits with old ones had confirmed that the plutonium cores in US weapons stockpiles were less subject to deleterious aging effects than previously anticipated.
