= John C. Browne =

American physicist

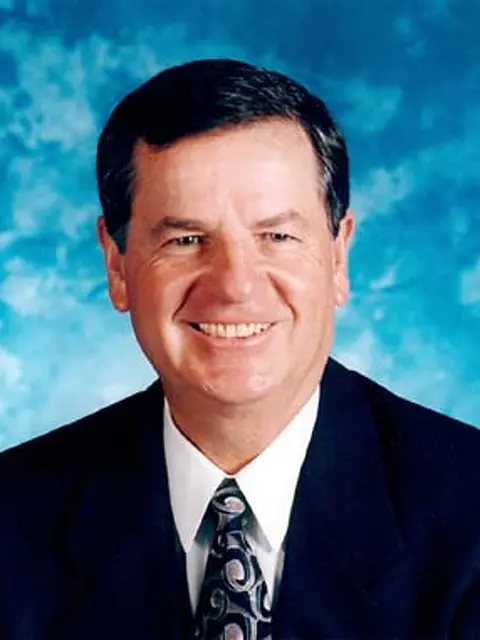
John C. Browne

John C. Browne (born July 29, 1942) is an American physicist.

== Biography ==
He was born in Pottstown, Pennsylvania as the fifth child of Charles I. and Mary Agnes (Titzer) Browne. He received a B.S. in physics from Drexel University (1965). He received a Ph.D. in physics from Duke University (1969). His thesis was titled "Fine Structure of Analog States in 61,63,65-Cu".

After teaching at Duke University (1969–70), he joined Lawrence Livermore National Laboratory in Livermore, California, where he did research in basic and applied nuclear physics at a 100-MeV electron linac, including studies in nuclear fission and nuclear astrophysics.

He joined Los Alamos National Laboratory in 1979 as head of Group P-3, the neutron physics group in the LANL physics division, helping to start a new research effort in weak interaction physics. He became physics division leader in 1981, succeeding George A. Keyworth II, who became President Ronald Reagan's science advisor. In 1984, he was appointed associate director for experimental physics by lab director Donald Kerr. When Siegfried Hecker became lab director in 1986, he appointed Browne to a series of posts. In 1986, Browne became associate director for research with responsibility for programs and divisions associated with the research funded by the DOE Office of Energy Research. He then served as associate director for defense research and applications (1986–91) where he was responsible for programs funded by the Department of Defense and the Intelligence community. In 1991, he became associate director for computational and information sciences. In 1993, he took over responsibilities for the Los Alamos Meson Physics Facility, changing its name to the Los Alamos Neutron Science Center (LANSCE), reflecting its mission change to neutron science for materials science and for fundamental and defense-related neutron studies.

In 1997, he was appointed by the University of California to be the director of Los Alamos National Laboratory. During his tenure, he strengthened the science-based stockpile stewardship program, created in the mid-1990s by Victor H. Reis of the DOE, which emphasizes computational study of nuclear weapons in the absence of nuclear testing. During Browne's tenure, the Wen Ho Lee spy investigation by the FBI erupted onto the national scene, particularly after release of the Cox Report by the US House of Representatives in 1999. Having started in the early 1990s, the controversy eventually culminated in Lee's release from prison.

Also during Browne's tenure, the laboratory experienced growth in nuclear weapons research, counter terrorism, and intelligence research programs, including two new buildings (Non-Proliferation and International Security Center and Nicholas Metropolis Supercomputing Center). He was also instrumental in creating support for the non-profit Los Alamos National Laboratory Foundation, founded in 1997 to enhance the vitality of northern New Mexico through investing in education, learning, and community development. In January 2003, Browne resigned as laboratory director during a controversy surrounding thefts of government property by several employees and accusations regarding the adequacy of administrative controls. The controversy prompted Secretary of Energy Spencer Abraham to say: "... taken together, these problems have called into question the University of California's ability to run the Los Alamos National Laboratory." The university quickly installed Pete Nanos as succeeding director.

Browne is retired from Los Alamos and serves on a number of non-profit boards. He was appointed a Fellow of the American Physical Society in 1987 and a Fellow of the American Association for the Advancement of Science (AAAS) in 2000.

Government offices
Preceded by Siegfried S. Hecker	Director of the Los Alamos National Laboratory; 1997–2003	Succeeded by George Peter Nanos
