= Pete Nanos =

American military officer (born 1945)

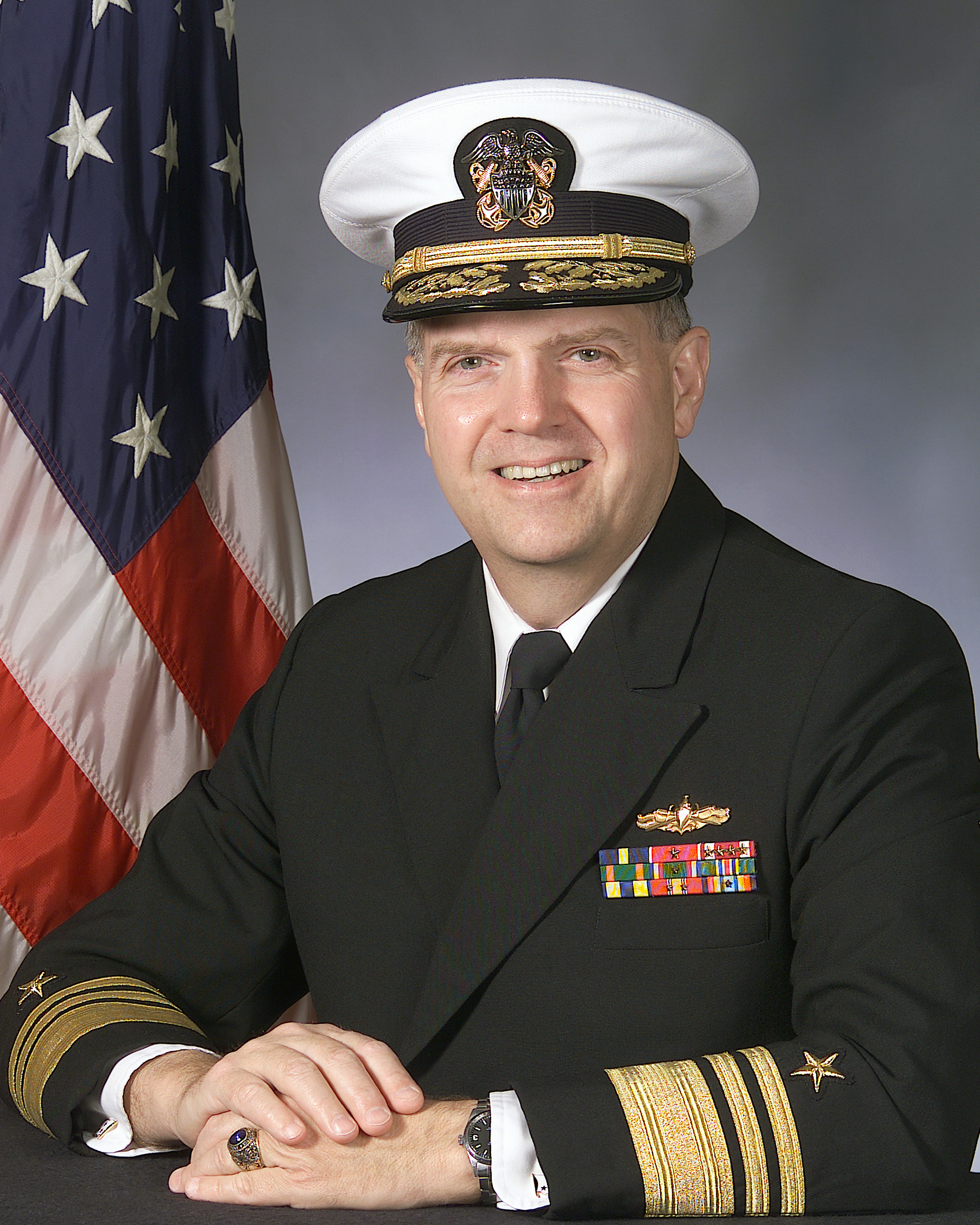
- Vice Admiral Nanos in 2002
- Born: George Peter Nanos Jr. 1945 (age 80–81); Bedford, New Hampshire, U.S.
- Education: United States Naval Academy (B.S.); Princeton University (Ph.D.)
- Known for: Military leadership 7th Director at Los Alamos National Lab (2003-2005)

George Peter Nanos Jr. is a retired vice admiral in the United States Navy and former director of the Los Alamos National Laboratory.

== Early life ==
Nanos was born in 1945, to a Greek father and an Irish mother. He grew up in Bedford, New Hampshire; though, he attended high school in the adjacent city of Manchester. In 1967, he received his Bachelor of Science in Engineering as a Trident Scholar at the United States Naval Academy. In 1973, he received his PhD in physics from Princeton University.

== Military career ==
Nanos served for 35 years in the United States Navy and retired as a vice admiral.

Nanos conducted many tours at sea aboard destroyers and carriers and is credited with the first-time application of systems engineering at the battle group level rather than just at the individual ship level. In 1989 he began ten years with the Navy's strategic programs overseeing the submarine inertial navigation and missile programs. In 1992, he became technical director of strategic system programs and, after promotion to rear admiral, was named director, where he served until 1999. Promoted to vice admiral, he served as the commander, Naval Sea Systems Command where he was responsible for design, development and logistics support for all navy ships and shipboard weapons systems until his retirement. In that capacity, he oversaw four nuclear repair shipyards, 10 defense laboratory divisions with more than 20,000 employees and over $23 billion in ship and weapons systems procurements, logistics and repairs.

He was awarded the Navy Distinguished Service Medal, the Legion of Merit (2 awards), the Meritorious Service Medal (5 awards), and the Navy Achievement Medal.

== Los Alamos National Laboratory ==
On January 6, 2003, Nanos began working as the interim director of Los Alamos National Lab. On July 17, 2003, he was named director of the lab.

In May 2004, Nanos ordered an emergency shutdown of operations after classified computer disks were reported missing by a flawed auditing procedure, and a student suffered an eye injury from a laser beam in the same week. "In no case will I authorize a restart until I'm absolutely convinced that each organization will not risk further compromise of safety, security and environment," Nanos said in an internal e-mail. "This willful flouting of the rules must stop, and I don't care how many people I have to fire to make it stop. If you think the rules are silly, if you think compliance is a joke, please resign now and save me the trouble," Nanos added in a separate e-mail to Los Alamos employees. The shutdown was unprecedented in the history of the national laboratory complex, creating severe tensions between him and laboratory employees.

Nanos stepped down as director in May 2005.

== Defense Threat Reduction Agency ==
In 2005, Nanos joined Defense Threat Reduction Agency (DTRA) as the associate director of research and development responsible for combating weapons of mass destruction (WMD) by providing R&D capabilities to reduce, eliminate, counter, and defeat the threat of WMD and mitigate their effects. In 2007, Nanos joined JHU/APL and returned to DTRA on an Intergovernmental Personnel Act (IPA) assignment, eventually assuming the position of associate director of operations enterprise in October 2009. In that capacity, he led and directed all combat support, nuclear support, cooperative threat reduction, and on-site inspection activities for DTRA.

== Johns Hopkins University / Applied Physics Laboratory ==
In 2007, Nanos joined the Applied Physics Laboratory (JHU/APL) and returned to Defense Threat Reduction Agency (DTRA) on an Intergovernmental Personnel Act (IPA) assignment, eventually assuming the position of associate director of operations enterprise in October 2009. In that capacity, he led and directed all combat support, nuclear support, cooperative threat reduction, and on-site inspection activities for DTRA.

In 2010, Nanos became a fellow in the National Security Analysis Department and later that same year accepted the temporary position as Head of the National Security Analysis Department at the Applied Physics Laboratory. In mid-2011, Nanos was appointed the acting head of the Global Engagement Department. Shortly thereafter, the laboratory completed a substantial reorganization, with Nanos being one of the key executives team members instrumental in providing the new framework. Upon completion of the reorganization and the official stand up of the Force Projection Department, Nanos was named the managing executive.

Government offices
Preceded by John C. Browne	Director of the Los Alamos National Laboratory; 2003–2005	Succeeded by Robert W. Kuckuck
