= Los Alamos National Security =

Company that runs Los Alamos National Laboratory

Los Alamos National Security, LLC (LANS LLC) was a private limited liability company (LLC) formed by the University of California, Bechtel, BWX Technologies, and URS Energy and Construction (which was purchased by AECOM in 2014). From its creation until November 1, 2018, it operated Los Alamos National Laboratory (LANL) for the Department of Energy and the National Nuclear Security Administration. It took over direct management and operation of the Los Alamos National Laboratory from the University of California on June 1, 2006. It was based in Los Alamos, New Mexico. Operation of Los Alamos National Laboratory are now overseen by Triad National Security.

An agreement between the four LANS members established a Board of Governors that were charged with oversight and governance of LANS, LLC. The Board included three individuals appointed by the University of California and three individuals appointed by Bechtel, as well as four independent Governors who were selected for their expertise and experience in fields pertinent to LANL operations. The Board included an executive committee that consisted of the six University of California and Bechtel appointees.

The President of LANS LLC, Charles F. McMillan, reported directly and solely to the LANS LLC Board of Governors. McMillan also served as laboratory director.

LANS was formed during a period of doubt about whether the University of California would be awarded the management contract, after it was forced to compete for the contract for the first time since it had first began to manage LANL during the Manhattan Project as a result of numerous scandals and dissatisfaction with its management. LANS eventually was pitted against the University of Texas System partnered with Lockheed Martin, and was awarded the LANL contract in December 2005.

In addition to being reimbursed for the cost of operating LANL ($2.2 billion annually), LANS receives a yearly fee for managing LANL of approximately $79 million from the Department of Energy.

In September 2007, director Michael R. Anastasio announced a possible layoff of 2500 people based on predicted budget shortfalls of $350M for FY08. The operating fee of approximately $79M and the state of New Mexico gross receipts tax (LANL was formerly operated by UC as a non-profit) contributed approximately half of the expected budget shortfall.

A series of blogs monitored and discussed the management of LANL since then-director Pete Nanos shut the laboratory down in response to several alleged safety and security incidents.

== LANS Board of Governors ==
- Norman J. Pattiz (LANS Chairman), chairman of Westwood One.
- Craig M. Albert, president of Bechtel Systems & Infrastructure, Inc.
- S. Robert Cochran, president of B & W Technical Services, Inc.
- Bruce B. Darling, Executive Vice President, University of California Office of the President.
- William R. Frazer, emeritus professor, University of California.
- Craig Weaver, executive vice president of Bechtel Systems and Infrastructure, Inc.
- Dr. Sidney Drell, professor emeritus and deputy director at the Stanford Linear Accelerator Center, and senior fellow at the Hoover Institution.
- Richard Mies, retired commander of U.S. Strategic Command.
- Nick Moore, retired global chairman of PricewaterhouseCoopers.
- Nick Salazar, member of the New Mexico House of Representatives.

== Related partnerships ==
Bechtel, one of the LANS partners, is also a partner in the operations of several other National Nuclear Security Administration facilities which collectively comprise the core of the United States' nuclear weapons design and production capability:

- Savannah River Site
- Lawrence Livermore National Laboratory
- Pantex
- Hanford Site
- Y-12 National Security Complex

Another LANS partner, BWX Technologies, also participates in the partnerships that manage Lawrence Livermore, Pantex, and Y-12.

== See also ==
- Top 100 US Federal Contractors
- Los Alamos National Laboratory
