= Simon White =

British astronomer (born 1951)

Simon David Manton White
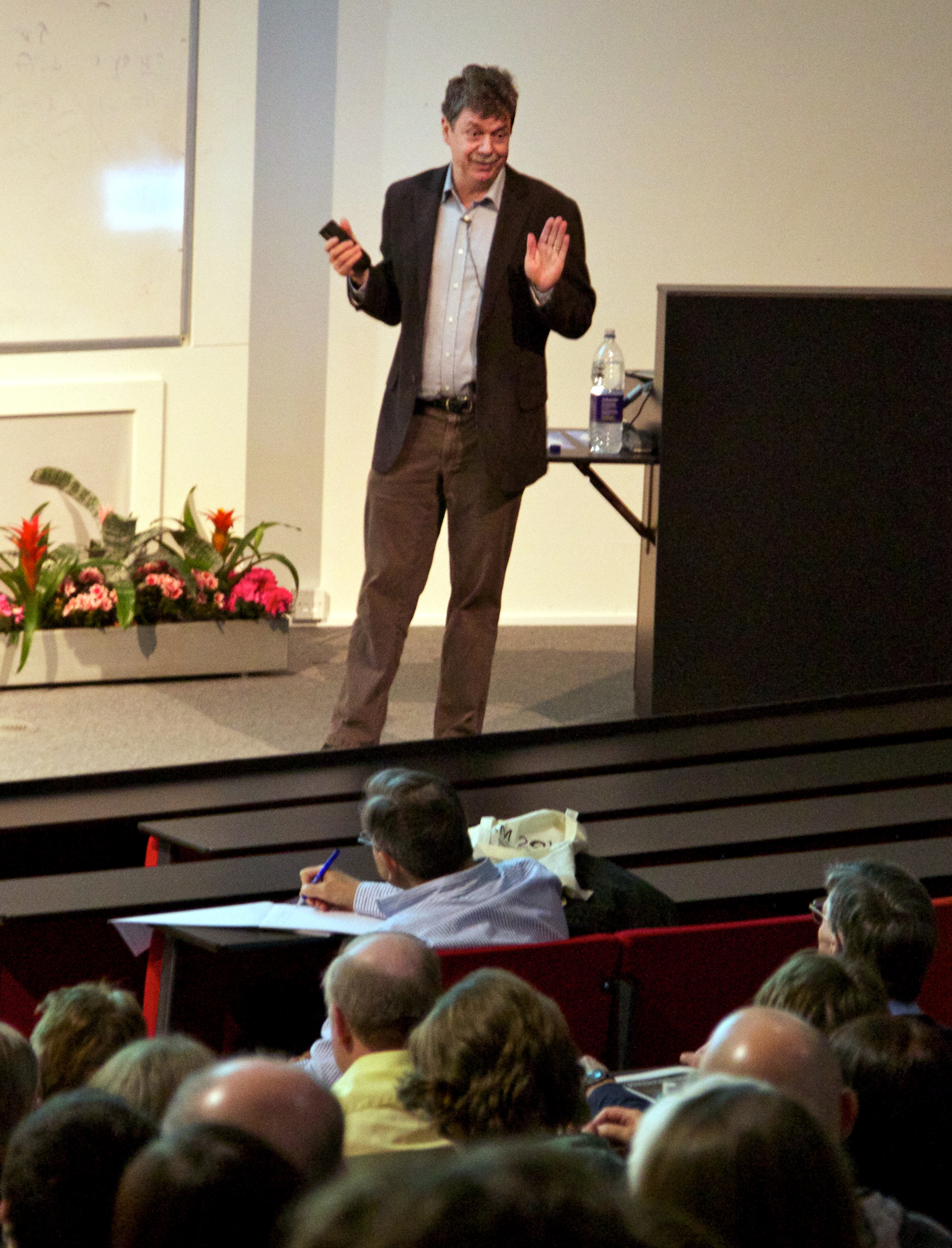
- Simon White speaking at the 2012 National Astronomy Meeting of the Royal Astronomical Society
- Born: Simon David Manton White; 30 September 1951 (age 75); Ashford, Kent, England
- Education: Jesus College, Cambridge; University of Toronto
- Known for: Navarro–Frenk–White profile
- Spouse: Guinevere Kauffmann
- Children: 1
- Awards: Helen B. Warner Prize (1986); Heineman Prize (2005); Gold Medal of the Royal Astronomical Society (2006); Brouwer Award (2008); Max Born Prize (2010); Gruber Cosmology Prize (2011); Shaw Prize (2017)
- Scientific career
- Fields: Astrophysics and cosmology Cosmological structure formation
- Workplaces: University of California, Berkeley; University of Arizona; University of Cambridge; Max Planck Institute for Astrophysics
- Thesis: The Clustering of Galaxies (1977)
- Doctoral advisor: Donald Lynden-Bell
- Doctoral students: Gabriella De Lucia; Amina Helmi; Guinevere Kauffmann; Hans-Walter Rix; Volker Springel

Simon David Manton White (born 30 September 1951), FRS, is a British-German astrophysicist. He was one of directors at the Max Planck Institute for Astrophysics before his retirement in late 2019. The Navarro–Frenk–White profile to describe dark matter is named after him.

== Life ==
White studied mathematics at Jesus College, Cambridge (B.A. 1972) and Astronomy at the University of Toronto (M.Sc. 1974). In 1977, he obtained a doctorate in Astronomy under Donald Lynden-Bell entitled "The Clustering of Galaxies" at the University of Cambridge. After a few years at the University of California, Berkeley, the Steward Observatory of the University of Arizona and the University of Cambridge, he was appointed in 1994 as a Scientific Member of the Max Planck Society and as director of the Max Planck Institute for Astrophysics in Garching. White has also been appointed research professor at the University of Arizona (1992), guest professor at the University of Durham (1995), honorary professor at LMU Munich (1994) and at the Astronomical Observatories of Shanghai (SHAO) (1999) and Beijing (BAO) (2001). White lives in Munich with his wife, the astrophysicist Guinevere Kauffmann. They have one son. In 2016, the day after the Brexit vote, White filed papers to obtain German citizenship.

== Work ==
White has worked primarily on the formation of structure in the Universe. He is known for his contributions to our understanding of galaxy formation and for his role in helping to establish the viability of the current standard model for the evolution of cosmic structure, the so-called ΛCDM model.

Already at the time of his doctoral work he studied the influence of dark matter on the growth of structure and in 1978 he and Martin Rees argued that the properties of galaxies can be understood if they form by gravitationally driven condensation of gas at the centres of extended dark matter halos as these grow steadily in mass through accretion and merging. This has been the basic paradigm for galaxy formation ever since.

In later years White developed computer models which allowed the growth of galaxies and galaxy clustering to be simulated directly in order to allow quantitative comparison of theoretical models with astronomical observations. His 1983 work with Marc Davis and Carlos Frenk demonstrated that the dark matter could not be made of massive neutrinos, at the time (and still) the only experimentally detected elementary particles which could be considered possible candidates. Their subsequent work together with George Efstathiou was particularly influential in establishing that a universe dominated by Cold Dark Matter (a hypothesized new kind of elementary particle) could produce large-scale structure in the galaxy distribution which does closely resemble that observed. A later large project was the Millennium Simulation, carried out in Garching in 2005 as part of the work of a large international collaboration, the Virgo Consortium. At the time, this was the largest N-body simulation ever carried out, with 10 billion N-body particles representing the dark matter distribution, and using simplified physical recipes to follow the formation and evolution of more than 20,000,000 galaxies throughout a cubic region more than 2 billion light-years on a side. Advances in computer technology since 2005 have allowed projects continuing the Millennium Simulation heritage to increase the number of particles followed, the number of galaxies formed, and the cosmic volume treated by factors of 100 or so.

Work by White has addressed issues of stellar dynamics, of the detailed structure of galaxies and their dark halos, of the processes controlling galaxy formation, of the structure and evolution of galaxy clusters, of the formation of elliptical galaxies through galaxy mergers, and of the statistics of galaxy clustering. Papers include those with Julio Navarro and Carlos Frenk on the "universal" structure of dark matter halos. The Navarro–Frenk–White profile is named after them, and the 1996 and 1997 papers in which they systematically used cosmological N-body simulations to explore its properties are currently White's highest impact theoretical work. This is because these two papers demonstrated that the characteristic size and density of dark matter halos are tightly related to their mass in a way which depends on, and so can be used to measure, important properties of our universe as a whole, for example, its material content and its spatial curvature, as well as the properties of the initial conditions from which all cosmic structure has grown.

== Awards and honours ==
- Helen B. Warner Prize of the American Astronomical Society, 1986
- Editor of Monthly Notices of the Royal Astronomical Society, 1992–present
- Fellow of the Royal Society, 1997
- Max-Planck Research Prize for International Cooperation, 2000
- Dannie Heineman Prize for Astrophysics of the AIP/AAS, 2005 (with George Efstathiou)
- Fellow of the Deutsche Akademie der Naturforscher Leopoldina, 2005
- Gold Medal of the Royal Astronomical Society, 2006
- Honorary Doctorate (D.Sc.) at the University of Durham, 2007
- Foreign Associate, US National Academy of Sciences, 2007
- Brouwer Award (Division on Dynamical Astronomy) of the American Astronomical Society, 2008
- European Latsis Prize 2008: Astrophysics
- Fellow of the Academia Europaea, 2009
- Max Born Prize of the German Physical Society and the Institute of Physics, 2010
- Honorary Citizen of the City of Padova, 2010
- Gruber Prize in Cosmology 2011 (with Marc Davis, George Efstathiou and Carlos Frenk)
- Foreign Member of the Chinese Academy of Sciences, 2015
- Shaw Prize 2017 in Astronomy
- Clarivate Citation Laureate in Physics 2020
