= UniverseMachine =

Computer simulated universes

The UniverseMachine (also known as the Universe Machine) is a project carrying out astrophysical supercomputer simulations of various models of possible universes, created by astronomer Peter Behroozi and his research team at the Steward Observatory and the University of Arizona. Numerous universes with different physical characteristics may be simulated in order to develop insights into the possible beginning and evolution of our universe. A major objective is to better understand the role of dark matter in the development of the universe. According to Behroozi, "On the computer, we can create many different universes and compare them to the actual one, and that lets us infer which rules lead to the one we see."

Besides lead investigator Behroozi, research team members include astronomer Charlie Conroy of Harvard University, physicist Andrew Hearin of the Argonne National Laboratory and physicist Risa Wechsler of Stanford University. Support funding for the project is provided by NASA, the National Science Foundation and the Munich Institute for Astro- and Particle Physics.

== Description ==
Besides using computers and related resources at the NASA Ames Research Center and the Leibniz-Rechenzentrum in Garching, Germany, the research team used the High-Performance Computing cluster at the University of Arizona. Two-thousand processors simultaneously processed the data over three weeks. In this way, the research team generated over 8 million universes, and at least 9.6×10^{13} galaxies. The UniverseMachine program continuously produced millions of simulated universes, each containing 12 million galaxies, and each permitted to develop from 400 million years after the Big Bang to the present day.

According to team member Wechsler, "The really cool thing about this study is that we can use all the data we have about galaxy evolution — the numbers of galaxies, how many stars they have and how they form those stars — and put that together into a comprehensive picture of the last 13 billion years of the universe." Wechsler further commented, "For me, the most exciting thing is that we now have a model where we can start to ask all of these questions in a framework that works […] We have a model that is inexpensive enough computationally, that we can essentially calculate an entire universe in about a second. Then we can afford to do that millions of times and explore all of the parameter space."

== Results ==
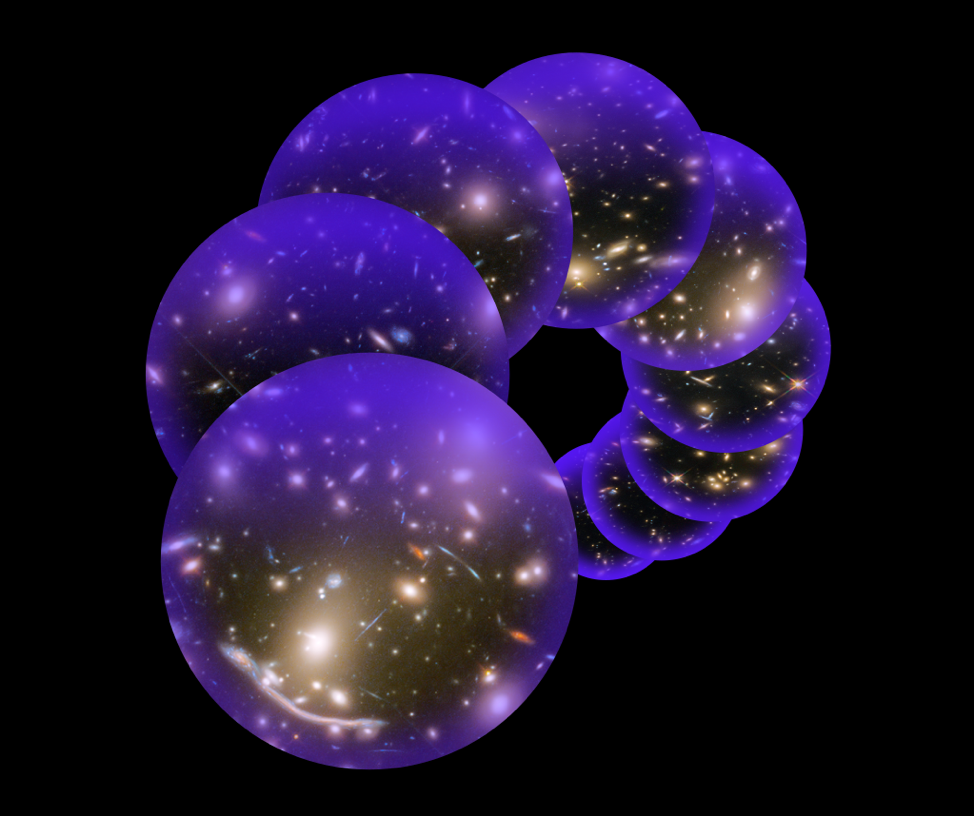
Logo of the UniverseMachine

One of the results of the study suggests that denser dark matter in the early universe does not seem to negatively impact star formation rates, as thought initially. According to the studies, galaxies of a given size were more likely to form stars for much longer, and at a high rate. The researchers expect to extend the project's objectives to include how often stars expire in supernovae, how dark matter may affect the shape of galaxies and eventually, by gaining better general cosmological insights, how life originated.

== See also ==
- Computational astrophysics – Methods and computing tools developed and used in astrophysics research
- Computational fluid dynamics – Analysis and solving of problems that involve fluid flows
- Computational simulation – Process of mathematical modelling, performed on a computer
- Galaxy – Large gravitationally bound system of stars and interstellar matter
- Galaxy formation and evolution – Subfield of cosmology
- Illustris project – Computer-simulated universes
- Large-scale structure of the universe – All of space observable from the Earth at the present
- List of cosmological computation software
- Millennium Run – Computer simulation of the universe
- N-body simulation – Simulation of a dynamical system of particles
