= Bolshoi cosmological simulation =

Computer simulation of the universe

The Bolshoi simulation, a computer model of the universe run in 2010 on the Pleiades supercomputer at the NASA Ames Research Center, was the most accurate cosmological simulation to that date of the evolution of the large-scale structure of the universe. The Bolshoi simulation used the now-standard ΛCDM (Lambda-CDM) model of the universe and the WMAP five-year and seven-year cosmological parameters from NASA's Wilkinson Microwave Anisotropy Probe team. "The principal purpose of the Bolshoi simulation is to compute and model the evolution of dark matter halos, thereby rendering the invisible visible for astronomers to study, and to predict visible structure that astronomers can seek to observe." “Bolshoi” is a Russian word meaning “big.”

The first two of a series of research papers describing Bolshoi and its implications were published in 2011 in the Astrophysical Journal. The first data release of Bolshoi outputs has been made publicly available to the world's astronomers and astrophysicists. The data include output from the Bolshoi simulation and from the BigBolshoi, or MultiDark, simulation of a volume 64 times that of Bolshoi. The Bolshoi-Planck simulation, with the same resolution as Bolshoi, was run in 2013 on the Pleiades supercomputer using the Planck satellite team's cosmological parameters released in March 2013. The Bolshoi-Planck simulation is currently being analyzed in preparation for publication and distribution of its results in 2014.

Bolshoi simulations continue to be developed as of 2018.

== Contributors ==
Joel R. Primack's team at the University of California, Santa Cruz, partnered with Anatoly Klypin's group at New Mexico State University, in Las Cruces to run and analyze the Bolshoi simulations. Further analysis and comparison with observations by Risa Wechsler's group at Stanford University and others are reflected in the papers based on the Bolshoi simulations.

== Rationale ==
A successful large-scale simulation of the evolution of galaxies, with results consistent with what is actually seen by astronomers in the night sky, provides evidence that the theoretical underpinnings of the models employed, i.e., the supercomputer implementations ΛCDM, are sound bases for understanding galactic dynamics and the history of the universe, and opens avenues to further research. The Bolshoi Simulation isn't the first large-scale simulation of the universe, but it is the first to rival the extraordinary precision of modern astrophysical observations.

The previous largest and most successful simulation of galactic evolution was the Millennium Simulation Project, led by Volker Springel. Although the success of that project stimulated more than 400 research papers, the Millennium simulations used early WMAP cosmological parameters that have since become obsolete. As a result, they led to some predictions, for example about the distribution of galaxies, that do not match very well with observations. The Bolshoi simulations use the latest cosmological parameters, are higher in resolution, and have been analyzed in greater detail.

== Methods ==
The Bolshoi simulation follows the evolving distribution of a statistical ensemble of 8.6 billion parcels of dark matter, each of which represents about 100 million solar masses, in a cube of 3-dimensional space about 1 billion light years on edge. Dark matter and dark energy dominate the evolution of the cosmos in this model. The dynamics are modeled with the ΛCDM theory and Albert Einstein's general theory of relativity, with the model including cold dark matter (CDM) and the Λ cosmological constant term simulating the cosmic acceleration referred to as dark energy.

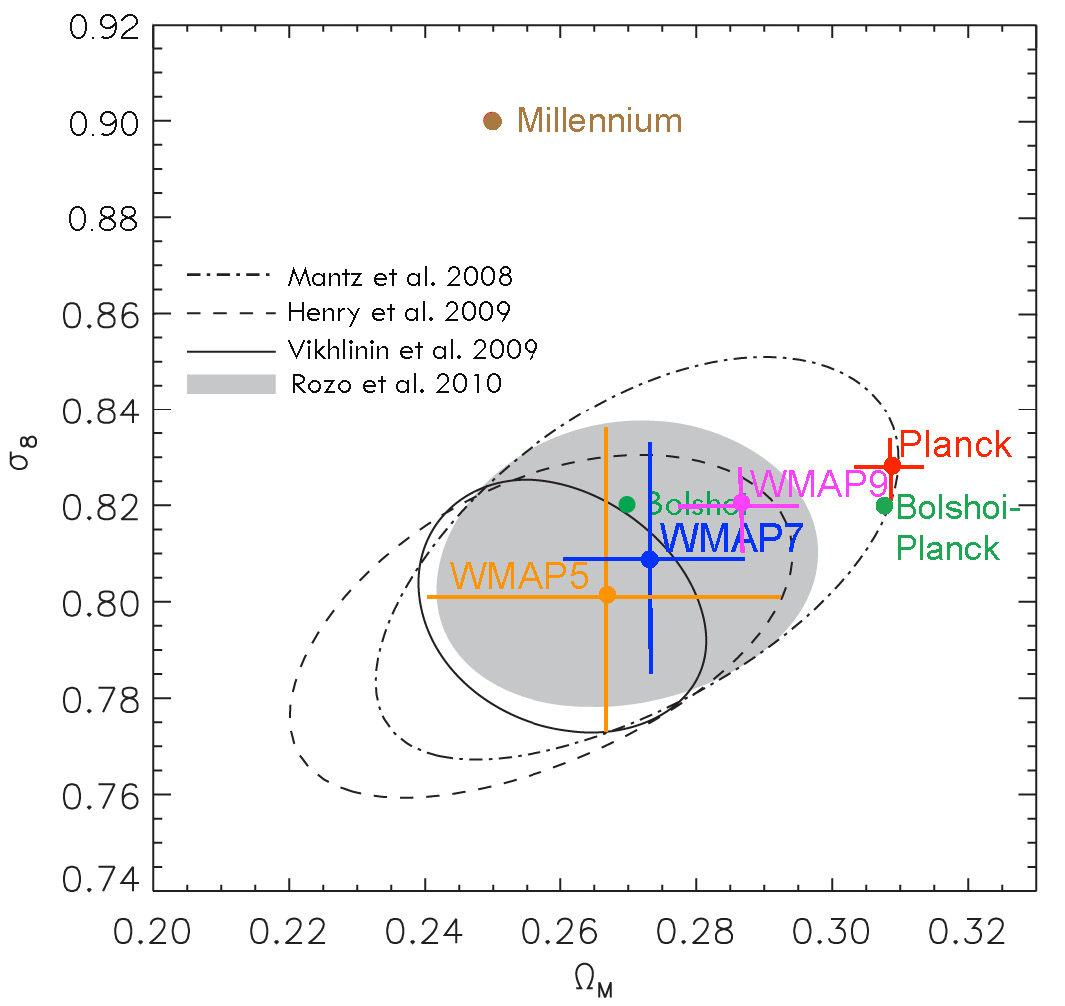
Two key cosmological parameters, σ8 and ΩM, with values and 1-σ uncertainties from observations and values used in three cosmological simulations. The parameter σ8 represents the amplitude of the fluctuation spectrum on the scale of clusters of galaxies, and the parameter ΩM is the dark + ordinary matter fraction of the cosmic density. The observations represented by the shapes on the figure are from X-ray and gravitational lensing studies of clusters of galaxies. The observations with error bars are from cosmic microwave background data combined with other data from the Wilkinson Microwave Anisotropy Probe (WMAP) five-year (2009), seven-year (2011), and nine-year (2013) publications and the Planck (2013) data release. The simulations are the Millennium I, II, and XXL simulations (which all used the same cosmological parameters consistent with the WMAP first-year data release 2003), and the Bolshoi (2011) and Bolshoi-Planck (2014) simulations.

The first 100 million years (Myr) or so of the evolution of the universe after the Big Bang can be derived analytically. The Bolshoi simulation was started at redshift z=80, corresponding to about 20 Myr after the Big Bang. Initial parameters were calculated with linear theory as implemented by the CAMB tools, part of the WMAP website. The tools provide the initial conditions, including a statistical distribution of positions and velocities of the particles in the ensemble, for the much more demanding Bolshoi simulation of the next approximately 13.8 billion years. The experimental volume thus represents a random region of the universe, so comparisons with observations must be statistical.

The Bolshoi simulation employs a version of an adaptive mesh refinement (AMR) algorithm called an adaptive refinement tree (ART), in which a cube in space with more than a predefined density of matter is recursively divided into a mesh of smaller cubes. The subdivision continues to a limiting level, chosen to avoid using too much supercomputer time. Neighboring cubes are not permitted to vary by too many levels, in the case of Bolshoi by more than one level of subdivision, to avoid large discontinuities. The AMR/ART method is well suited to model the increasingly inhomogeneous distribution of matter that evolves as the simulation proceeds. “Once constructed, the mesh, rather than being destroyed at each time step, is promptly adjusted to the evolving particle distribution.” As the Bolshoi simulation ran, the position and velocity of each of the 8.6 billion particles representing dark matter was recorded in 180 snapshots roughly evenly spaced over the simulated 13.8-billion-year run on the Pleiades supercomputer. Each snapshot was then analyzed to find all the dark matter halos and the properties of each (particle membership, location, density distribution, rotation, shape, etc.). All this data was then used to determine the entire growth and merging history of every halo. These results are used in turn to predict where galaxies will form and how they will evolve. How well these predictions correspond to observations provides a measure of the success of the simulation. Other checks were also made.

== Results ==
The Bolshoi simulation is considered to have produced the best approximation to reality so far obtained for so large a volume of space, about 1 billion light years across. “Bolshoi produces a model universe that bears a striking and uncanny resemblance to the real thing. Starting with initial conditions based on the known distribution of matter shortly after the Big Bang, and using Einstein’s general theory of relativity as the ‘rules’ of the simulation, Bolshoi predicts a modern-day universe with galaxies lining up into hundred-million-light-year-long filaments that surround immense voids, forming a cosmic foam-like structure that precisely matches the cosmic web as revealed by deep galaxy studies such as the Sloan Digital Sky Survey. To achieve such a close match, Bolshoi is clearly giving cosmologists a fairly accurate picture of how the universe actually evolved.” The Bolshoi simulation found that the Sheth–Tormen approximation overpredicts the abundance of halos by a factor of $10$ for redshifts $z>10$.

== Support ==
This research was supported by grants from NASA and the National Science Foundation (U.S.) to Joel Primack and Anatoly Klypin, including massive grants of supercomputer time on the NASA Advanced Supercomputing (NAS) supercomputer Pleiades at NASA Ames Research Center. Hosting of the Bolshoi outputs and analyses at Leibniz Institute for Astrophysics Potsdam (AIP) is partially supported by the MultiDark grant from the Spanish MICINN Programme.

== In popular culture ==
A visualization from the Bolshoi simulation was narrated in the National Geographic TV special Inside the Milky Way. The Icelandic singer-songwriter Björk used footage from the Bolshoi cosmological simulation in the performance of her musical number “Dark Matter” in her Biophilia concert.

== See also ==
- Illustris project – Computer-simulated universes

== References for figure ==
- Mantz, A., Allen, S. W., Ebeling, H., & Rapetti, D. 2008, MNRAS, 387, 1179
- Henry, J. P., Evrard, A. E., Hoekstra, H., Babul, A., & Mahdavi, A. 2009, ApJ, 691, 1307
- Vikhlinin, A., Kravtsov, A. V., Burenin, R. A., et al. 2009, ApJ, 692, 1060
- Rozo, E., Rykoff, E. S., Evrard, A., et al. 2009, ApJ, 699, 768
