= Carlos Frenk =

Mexican-British cosmologist (born 1951)

Professor Sir Carlos Frenk CBE FRS
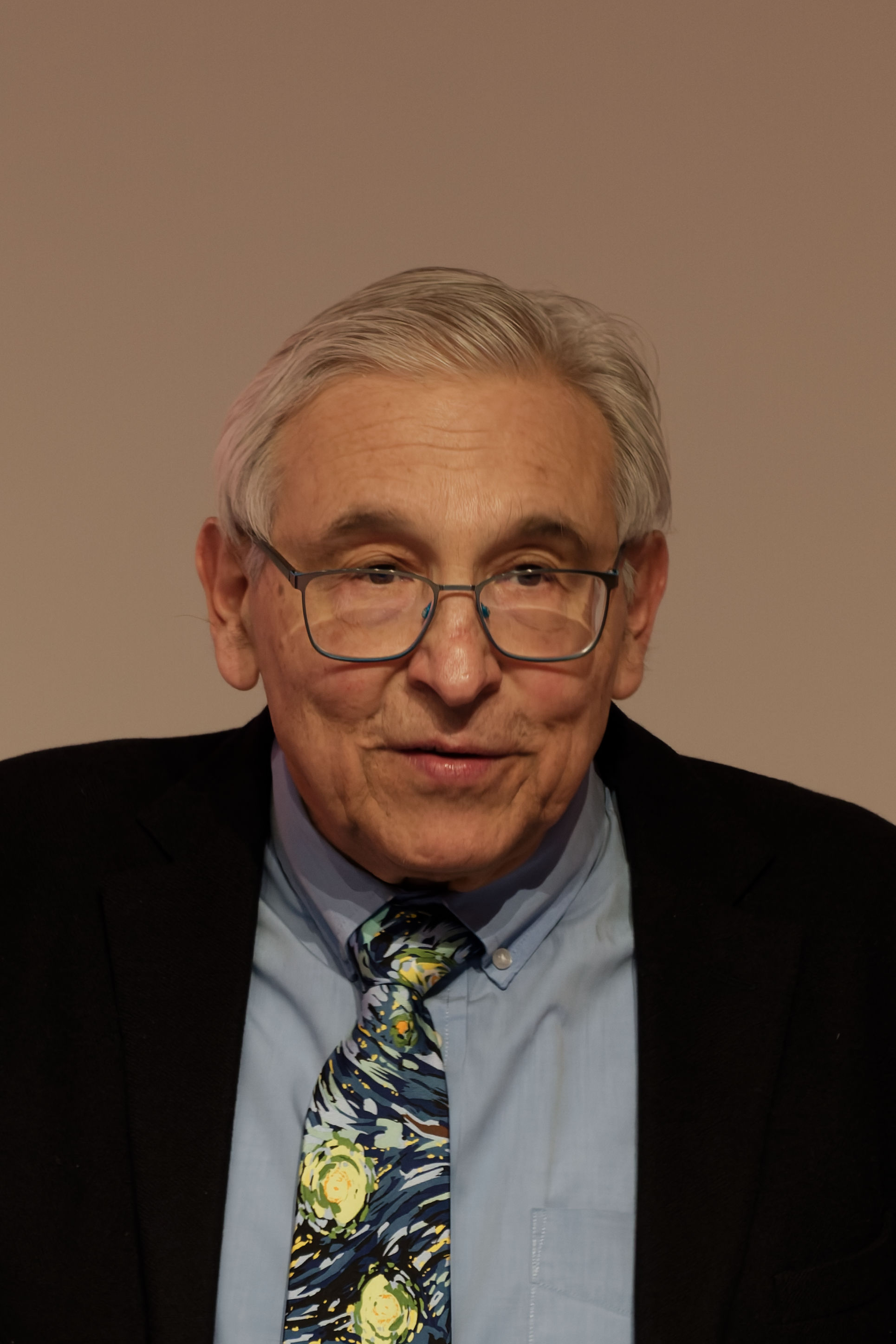
- Frenk in 2026
- Born: 27 October 1951 (age 74)
- Citizenship: British, Mexican
- Education: National Autonomous University of Mexico (BSc); University of Cambridge (PhD)
- Known for: Navarro–Frenk–White profile
- Spouse: Susan Frenk
- Children: 2
- Relatives: Julio Frenk (brother) a physician and academic administrator, Chancellor of UCLA.
- Scientific career
- Fields: Astrophysics
- Workplaces: Durham University; University of Sussex; University of California, Santa Barbara; University of California, Berkeley
- Thesis: Globular clusters in the galaxy and in the Large Magellanic Cloud (1981)
- Doctoral advisor: Bernard J. T. Jones
- Doctoral students: Ben Moore; Gillian Wilson
- Website: astro.dur.ac.uk/~csf/homepage/

Professor Sir Carlos Silvestre Frenk CBE FRS (born 27 October 1951) is a Mexican-British cosmologist. whose research has focused on galaxy formation, dark matter and the large-scale structure of the Universe. He contributed to the development of the Cold Dark Matter paradigm and co-developed the Navarro–Frenk–White profile with Julio Navarro and Simon White. He has been Ogden Professor of Fundamental Physics at Durham University since 2001 and served as founding Director of the Institute for Computational Cosmology from 2001 to 2020. Frenk is a co-founder of the Virgo Consortium, an international collaboration that carries out large-scale cosmological simulations, including the Millennium Simulation. He has also participated in the Dark Energy Spectroscopic Instrument (DESI) collaboration and has been associated with large numerical simulation projects including FLAMINGO and COLIBRE. He was elected a Fellow of the Royal Society in 2004, appointed Commander of the Order of the British Empire (CBE) in the 2017 Birthday Honours for services to cosmology, and knighted as a Knight Bachelor in the 2026 Birthday Honours for services to astrophysics and cosmology.

== Early life and education ==
Frenk was born in Mexico City, Mexico. His father was a German-Jewish physician who emigrated before the Second World War, and his mother was a Mexican pianist. He studied engineering and later theoretical physics at the at the National Autonomous University of Mexico (UNAM), graduating in 1976 with the Gabino Barreda Medal.. He subsequently moved to the University of Cambridge on a British Council Fellowship, completing Part III of the Mathematical Tripos and receiving a PhD in 1981 under the supervision of Bernard J. T. Jones focusing on globular clusters.

His younger brother, Julio Frenk, is a physician and academic administrator who has served as Mexico's Minister of Health, President of the University of Miami, and Chancellor of the University of California, Los Angeles (UCLA).

== Career ==
After his doctorate, Frenk held research positions University of California, Berkeley, where he collaborated with Marc Davis on galaxy surveys. In 1983, Frenk, Davis, and Simon White published work showing that neutrinos could not account for dark matter. He later held posts at the University of California, Santa Barbara and the University of Sussex.

With Davis, White, and George Efstathiou, Frenk helped develop early simulations supporting the cold dark matter (CDM) model. A 1985 paper in The Astrophysical Journal presented the first large-scale CDM simulations.

In 1986, Frenk joined Durham University, becoming professor in 1993. In 1994 he and White co-founded the Virgo Consortium for cosmological simulations.

=== Navarro–Frenk–White profile ===
In 1996 and 1997, Frenk, White, and Julio Navarro described the Navarro–Frenk–White profile, which characterises the distribution of dark matter in halos and is widely used in cosmology.

=== Later work ===
In 2001, Frenk became the first Ogden Professor of Fundamental Physics at Durham and founding director of the Institute for Computational Cosmology, a post he held until 2020. He was part of the Virgo Consortium’s Millennium Run project and continues to work on large-scale simulations of galaxy formation.

== Personal life ==
Frenk is married to Lady Dr. Susan Frenk, a lecturer in Spanish and Latin American literature and Principal of St Aidan's College, Durham. They have two sons.

== Honours ==
Frenk was elected a Fellow of the Royal Society (FRS) in 2004. He was appointed Commander of the Order of the British Empire (CBE) in the 2017 Birthday Honours for services to cosmology, and was knighted in the 2026 Birthday Honours for services to astrophysics and cosmology.

He has received the Gold Medal of the Royal Astronomical Society (2014), the Royal Society Wolfson Research Merit Award (2006), the Daniel Chalonge Medal (2007), the George Darwin Lectureship (2010), the Fred Hoyle Medal and Prize (2010), the Gruber Prize in Cosmology (2011), the Max Born Prize (2017), the Dirac Medal and Prize (2020), and the Rumford Medal (2021).

In 2023 he was named an Honorary Fellow of King's College, Cambridge.

== Public engagement ==
Frenk has appeared on television and radio, including The Sky at Night and BBC Radio 4’s Desert Island Discs in 2018.
