= GADGET =

Computer software for cosmological simulations

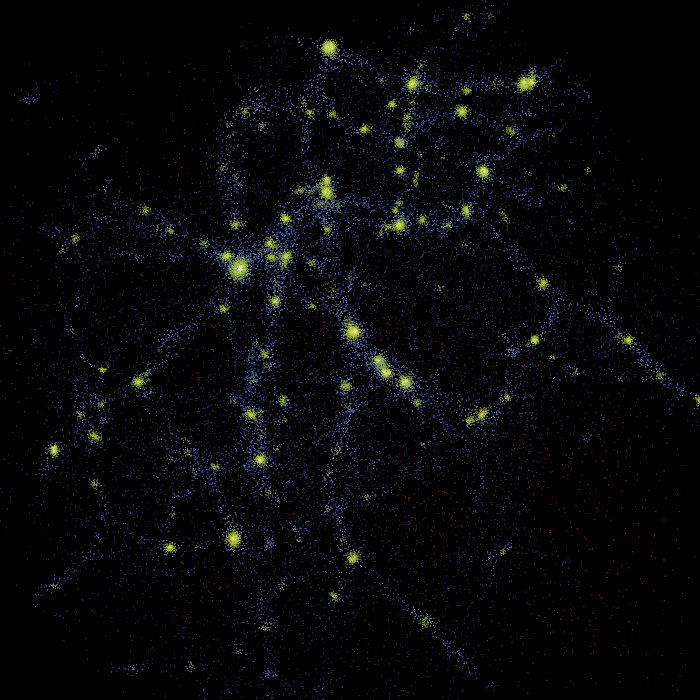
Snapshot from a GADGET simulation of structure formation in a ΛCDM universe.

GADGET is free software for cosmological N-body/SPH simulations written by Volker Springel at the Max Planck Institute for Astrophysics. The name is an acronym of "GAlaxies with Dark matter and Gas intEracT". It is released under the GNU GPL. It can be used to study for example galaxy formation and dark matter.

== Description ==
GADGET computes gravitational forces with a hierarchical tree algorithm (optionally in combination with a particle-mesh scheme for long-range gravitational forces) and represents fluids by means of smoothed-particle hydrodynamics (SPH). The code can be used for studies of isolated systems, or for simulations that include the cosmological expansion of space, both with or without periodic boundary conditions. In all these types of simulations, GADGET follows the evolution of a self-gravitating collisionless N-body system, and allows gas dynamics to be optionally included. Both the force computation and the time stepping of GADGET are fully adaptive, with a dynamic range which is, in principle, unlimited.

GADGET can therefore be used to address a wide array of astrophysically interesting problems, ranging from colliding and merging galaxies, to the formation of large-scale structure in the universe. With the inclusion of additional physical processes such as radiative cooling and heating, GADGET can also be used to study the dynamics of the gaseous intergalactic medium, or to address star formation and its regulation by feedback processes.

== History ==
The first public version (GADGET-1, released in March 2000) was created as part of Volker Springel's PhD project under the supervision of Simon White. Later, the code was continuously improved during postdocs of Volker Springel at the Center for Astrophysics | Harvard & Smithsonian and the Max Planck Institute, in collaboration with Simon White and Lars Hernquist.

The second public version (GADGET-2, released in May 2005) contains most of these improvements, except for the numerous physics modules developed for the code that go beyond gravity and ordinary gas-dynamics. The most important changes lie in a new time integration model, a new tree-code module, a new communication scheme for gravitational and SPH forces, a new domain decomposition strategy, a novel SPH formulation based on entropy as independent variable, and finally, in the addition of the TreePM functionality.

An updated, non-public intermediate version, GADGET-3, was developed for large-scale cosmological projects including the Millennium-XXL and OWLS simulations, introducing improved domain decomposition and hybrid OpenMP/MPI parallelism.

The fourth major generation, GADGET-4, was publicly released in 2021. GADGET-4 represents a comprehensive rewrite in C++, incorporating a hierarchical Fast Multipole Method (FMM) gravity solver, dynamic memory management, on-the-fly group and subhalo finding, and generation of cosmological light-cone outputs.

== See also ==
- Computational physics
- Millennium Run
