= Marc Davis (astronomer) =

American astronomer (born 1947)

- Born: 1947 (age 78–79); Canton, Ohio, United States
- Education: Massachusetts Institute of Technology (BA); Princeton University (PhD)
- Known for: Galaxy surveys, cosmology, N-body simulations, interstellar dust
- Awards: Dannie Heineman Prize (2006), Gruber Prize (2011)
- Scientific career
- Fields: Cosmology; astronomy
- Workplaces: Princeton University; Harvard-Smithsonian Center for Astrophysics; University of California, Berkeley
- Doctoral advisor: David T. Wilkinson
- Doctoral students: Alison Coil; David J. Schlegel

Marc Davis (born September 8, 1947) is an American professor of astronomy and physics at the University of California, Berkeley. Davis received his bachelor's degree from the Massachusetts Institute of Technology in 1969, his PhD from Princeton University in 1973 and has been elected to both the National Academy of Sciences (1991) and the American Academy of Arts and Sciences (1992). He taught for a year at Princeton, 1973–1974, then was on the astronomy faculty at Harvard University from 1975 to 1981. Since 1981, he has been on the faculty of the Department of Astronomy and Physics at the University of California at Berkeley.

== Career ==
Davis' work has been in physical cosmology and he has done a number of significant projects. While at Harvard, he led the CfA (Center for Astrophysics, Harvard & Smithsonian) galaxy survey, the first redshift survey of galaxies, which motivated his interest in N-body simulations of the Universe. In the 1980s, at Berkeley, he was part of a collaboration with George Efstathiou, Carlos Frenk and Simon White that established the validity of the "cold dark matter" theory for the formation of galaxies and other cosmic structures, now the accepted interpretation in cosmology. In a series of nine papers published between 1984 and 1992, that collaboration (often referred to as DEFW) used computer code to simulate the growth of the universe and resolve disputes among theoretical models.

Through the 1990s, Davis worked on the theoretically expected large scale flow of galaxies and led the redshift survey of the first all-sky catalog, IRAS, with which he was able to estimate the flow of galaxies out to redshifts of order 6,000 km/s. He took up this project once again in 2010 using the gravity field estimated from 2MASS, and he and Adi Nusser were able to estimate the field to redshift of order 10,000 km/s.

He published a widely-used Galactic dust map in 1998, with David J. Schlegel and Douglas P. Finkbeiner. The map provided estimates of Galactic reddening and the dust-related contamination of cosmic microwave background measurements.

He was the lead principal investigator on the ambitious DEEP2 Redshift Survey of 50,000 high redshift galaxies. This was conducted on the 10 metres (33 ft) W. M. Keck Observatory in Hawaii. The scientific goals of the DEEP survey were to study the properties of galaxies and the clustering of galaxies as the universe has evolved.

== Honors and awards ==
Davis was awarded an honorary PhD from the University of Chicago in 2008. He has also been named a fellow of the American Association for the Advancement of Science and the American Physical Society, and he has received the Dannie Heineman Prize for Astrophysics from the American Institute of Physics and the American Astronomical Society, as well as the Gruber Prize in Cosmology in 2011, among numerous other prizes and awards.

== Stroke ==
While working on the DEEP survey, Davis suffered a stroke in June 2003, which has affected his right limbs, although he continues to enjoy one of the main passions in his life, skiing.
