= Navarro–Frenk–White profile =

Spatial mass distribution of dark matter

The Navarro–Frenk–White (NFW) profile is one of the most commonly used models for the structure of dark matter halos. It describes the average density of dark matter in galaxy and galaxy cluster halos as a function of distance from their center. It was originally proposed on the basis of N-body simulations by Julio Navarro, Carlos Frenk and Simon White in 1996. The substantial impact of this work on the theoretical understanding of cosmic structure formation can be traced to three key insights.

1. In cosmological models where dark matter structure grows hierarchically from weak initial fluctuations, dark matter halos are almost self-similar; halo regions which are close to dynamical equilibrium are adequately represented for all masses and at all times by a simple analytic formula with only two free parameters, a characteristic density and a characteristic size.
2. These two parameters are related with rather little scatter; larger halos are less dense. The size-density relation depends on cosmological parameters and so can be used to constrain these observationally.
3. The characteristic density of a halo is linked to the mean density of the universe at its epoch of maximal growth. Thus the size-density relation reflects the fact that larger halos typically assembled at later times.

== Density distribution ==
Plot of the NFW and Einasto profiles

In the NFW profile, the density of dark matter as a function of radius is given by:
$$\rho (r) = \frac{\rho_0}{\frac{r}{R_s}\left(1~+~\frac{r}{R_s}\right)^2}$$
where ρ_{0} and the "scale radius", R_{s}, are parameters which vary from halo to halo.

The integrated mass within some radius R_{max} is
$$M = \int_0^{R_\max} 4\pi r^2 \rho (r) \, dr=4\pi \rho_0 R_s^3 \left[
\ln\left(\frac{R_s+R_\max}{R_s}\right)-\frac{R_\max}{R_s+R_\max}\right]$$

The total mass is divergent, but it is often useful to take the edge of the halo to be the virial radius, R_{vir}, which is related to the "concentration parameter", c, and scale radius via
$$R_\mathrm{vir} = c R_s$$
(Alternatively, one can define a radius at which the average density within this radius is $\Delta$ times the critical or mean density of the universe, resulting in a similar relation: $R_{\Delta}=c_{\Delta} R_s$. The virial radius will lie around $R_{200}$ to $R_{500}$, though values of $\Delta=1000$ are used in X-ray astronomy, for example, because the observational data typically do not extend to larger radii.)

The total mass in the halo within $R_\mathrm{vir}$ is
$$M = \int_0^{R_\mathrm{vir}} 4\pi r^2 \rho (r) \, dr=4\pi \rho_0 R_s^3 \left[\ln(1+c) - \frac{c}{1+c} \right].$$

The specific value of c is roughly 10 or 15 for the Milky Way, and may range from 4 to 40 for halos of various sizes.

This can then be used to define a dark matter halo in terms of its mean density, solving the above equation for $\rho_0$ and substituting it into the original equation. This gives
$$\rho(r) = \frac{\rho_\text{halo}}{3 A_\text{NFW} \, x (c^{-1} + x)^2}$$
where

- $\rho_\text{halo} \equiv M \biggr / \left( \frac{4}{3} \pi R_\text{vir}^3 \right)$ is the mean density of the halo,
- $A_\text{NFW} = \left[ \ln(1+c) - \frac{c}{1+c} \right]$ is from the mass calculation, and
- $x = r/R_\text{vir}$ is the fractional distance to the virial radius.

=== Higher order moments ===
The integral of the squared density is
$$\int_0^{R_\max} 4\pi r^2 \rho (r)^2 \, dr
= \frac{4\pi}{3} R_s^3 \rho_0^2 \left[1-\frac{R_s^3}{(R_s+R_\max)^3}\right]$$
so that the mean squared density inside of R_{max} is
$$\langle \rho^2 \rangle_{R_\max}
= \frac{R_s^3\rho_0^2}{R_\max^3} \left[1-\frac{R_s^3}{(R_s+R_\max)^3}\right]$$
which for the virial radius simplifies to
$$\langle \rho^2 \rangle_{R_\mathrm{vir}}
= \frac{\rho_0^2}{c^3} \left[1-\frac{1}{(1+c)^3}\right]
\approx \frac{\rho_0^2}{c^3}$$
and the mean squared density inside the scale radius is simply
$$\langle \rho^2 \rangle_{R_s} = \frac{7}{8}\rho_0^2$$
This is useful for predicting the total luminosity due to dark matter annihilation which is proportional to this moment.

=== Gravitational potential ===
Solving Poisson's equation gives the gravitational potential
$$\Phi(r) = - \frac{4\pi G \rho_0 R_s^3}{r} \ln \left( 1+ \frac{r}{R_s} \right)$$
with the limits $\lim_{r\to \infty} \Phi=0$ and $\lim_{r\to 0} \Phi = -4\pi G\rho_0 R_s^2$.

The acceleration due to the NFW potential is:
$$\mathbf{a} = -\nabla{\Phi_\text{NFW}(\mathbf{r})} = G\frac{M_\text{vir}}{\ln{(1+c)}-c/(1+c) } \frac{r/(r+R_s)-\ln{(1+r/R_s)}}{r^3} \mathbf{r}$$
where $\mathbf{r}$ is the position vector and $M_\text{vir} = \frac{4\pi}{3}r_\text{vir}^3 200\rho_\text{crit}$. Note that the amplitude of the acceleration tends to a constant as the radius becomes small.

=== Radius of the maximum circular velocity ===
The radius of the maximum circular velocity (confusingly sometimes also referred to as $R_\max$) can be found from the maximum of $M(r)/r$ as
$$R^\max_{\mathrm{circ}} = \alpha R_s$$
where $\alpha \approx 2.16258$ is the positive root of
$$\ln \left( 1 + \alpha \right) =  \frac{\alpha (1+2\alpha)}{(1+\alpha)^2}.$$
Maximum circular velocity is also related to the characteristic density and length scale of NFW profile:
$$V^\max_{\mathrm{circ}} \approx 1.64 R_s \sqrt{G \rho_0}$$

== Dark matter simulations ==
Over a broad range of halo mass and redshift, the NFW profile approximates the equilibrium configuration of dark matter halos produced in simulations of collisionless dark matter particles by numerous groups of scientists. Before the dark matter virializes, the distribution of dark matter deviates from an NFW profile, and significant substructure is observed in simulations both during and after the collapse of the halos.

Alternative models, in particular the Einasto profile, have been shown to represent the dark matter profiles of simulated halos as well as or better than the NFW profile by including an additional third parameter. The Einasto profile has a finite central density, unlike the NFW profile which has a divergent (infinite) central density. Because of the limited resolution of N-body simulations, it is not yet known which model provides the best description of the central densities of simulated dark-matter halos.

Simulations assuming different cosmological initial conditions produce halo populations in which the two parameters of the NFW profile follow different mass-concentration relations, depending on cosmological properties such as the density of the universe and the nature of the very early process which created all structure. Observational measurements of this relation thus offer a route to constraining these properties.

== Observations of halos ==
The dark matter density profiles of massive galaxy clusters can be measured directly by gravitational lensing and agree well with the NFW profiles predicted for cosmologies with the parameters inferred from other data. For lower mass halos, gravitational lensing is too noisy to give useful results for individual objects, but accurate measurements can still be made by averaging the profiles of many similar systems. For the main body of the halos, the agreement with the predictions remains good down to halo masses as small as those of the halos surrounding isolated galaxies like our own. The inner regions of halos are beyond the reach of lensing measurements, however, and other techniques give results which disagree with NFW predictions for the dark matter distribution inside the visible galaxies which lie at halo centers.

Observations of the inner regions of bright galaxies such as the Milky Way and M31 may be compatible with the NFW profile, but this is open to debate. The NFW dark matter profile is not consistent with observations of the inner regions of low surface brightness galaxies, which have less central mass than predicted. This is known as the cusp-core or cuspy halo problem. It is currently debated whether this discrepancy is a consequence of the nature of the dark matter, of the influence of dynamical processes during galaxy formation, or of shortcomings in dynamical modelling of the observational data.

== See also ==
- Einasto profile
- Singular isothermal sphere profile
