= Gruber Prize in Cosmology =

The Gruber Prize in Cosmology
- Awarded for: Discoveries leading to fundamental advances in our understanding of the universe
- Location: Yale University Office of Development, New Haven, Connecticut
- Presented by: Gruber Foundation
- Reward: US$500,000
- First award: 2000
- Website: gruber.yale.edu

The Gruber Prize in Cosmology, established in 2000, is one of three prestigious international awards worth US$500,000 awarded by the Gruber Foundation, a non-profit organization based at Yale University in New Haven, Connecticut.

Since 2001, the Gruber Prize in Cosmology has been co-sponsored by the International Astronomical Union.

Recipients are selected by a panel from nominations that are received from around the world.

The Gruber Foundation Cosmology Prize honors a leading cosmologist, astronomer, astrophysicist or scientific philosopher for theoretical, analytical or conceptual discoveries leading to fundamental advances in the field. The Foundation also award prizes in genetics and neuroscience.

== Recipients ==
- 2000 Allan Sandage and Philip James E. Peebles
- 2001 Lord Martin Rees
- 2002 Vera Rubin
- 2003 Rashid Sunyaev director at the Max-Planck-Institut für Astrophysik
- 2004 Alan Guth and Andrei Linde
- 2005 James E. Gunn principal designer of the Hubble Space Telescope
- 2006 John Mather (co-recipient of the 2006 Nobel Prize in Physics) and the Cosmic Background Explorer (COBE) Team
- 2007 High-z Supernova Search Team, Supernova Cosmology Project, Brian P. Schmidt and Saul Perlmutter
- 2008 J. Richard Bond, director of the Canadian Institute for Advanced Research Cosmology and Gravity Program; Canadian Institute for Theoretical Astrophysics
- 2009 Wendy Freedman, director of the Observatories of the Carnegie Institution of Washington in Pasadena, California; Robert Kennicutt, director of the Institute of Astronomy at the University of Cambridge in England; and Jeremy Mould, professorial fellow at the University of Melbourne School of Physics
- 2010 Charles Steidel, the Lee A. DuBridge Professor of Astronomy at the California Institute of Technology, in recognition of his revolutionary studies of the most distant galaxies in the universe
- 2011 Simon White, Carlos Frenk, Marc Davis and George Efstathiou
- 2012 Charles L. Bennett (Professor of Physics and Astronomy at Johns Hopkins University) and the Wilkinson Microwave Anisotropy Probe (WMAP) Team
- 2013 Viatcheslav Mukhanov and Alexei Starobinsky
- 2014 Sidney van den Bergh, Jaan Einasto, Kenneth Freeman and R. Brent Tully
- 2015 John E. Carlstrom, Jeremiah P. Ostriker and Lyman A. Page Jr
- 2016 Ronald Drever, Kip Thorne, Rainer Weiss, and the entire Laser Interferometer Gravitational-Wave Observatory (LIGO) discovery team.
- 2017 Sandra M. Faber
- 2018 Nazzareno Mandolesi, Jean-Loup Puget and ESA Planck team.
- 2019 Nicholas Kaiser and Joseph Silk, "for their seminal contributions to the theory of cosmological structure formation and probes of dark matter".
- 2020 Lars Hernquist and Volker Springel
- 2021 Marc Kamionkowski, Uroš Seljak, and Matias Zaldarriaga
- 2022 Frank Eisenhauer
- 2023 Richard Ellis
- 2024 Marcia J. Rieke
- 2025 Ryan Cooke and Max Pettini
- 2026 Alexei V. Filippenko, Ken'ichi Nomoto, and Stanford Woosley

== See also ==
- List of astronomy awards
