= Ben Moore (astrophysicist) =

American professor of astrophysics

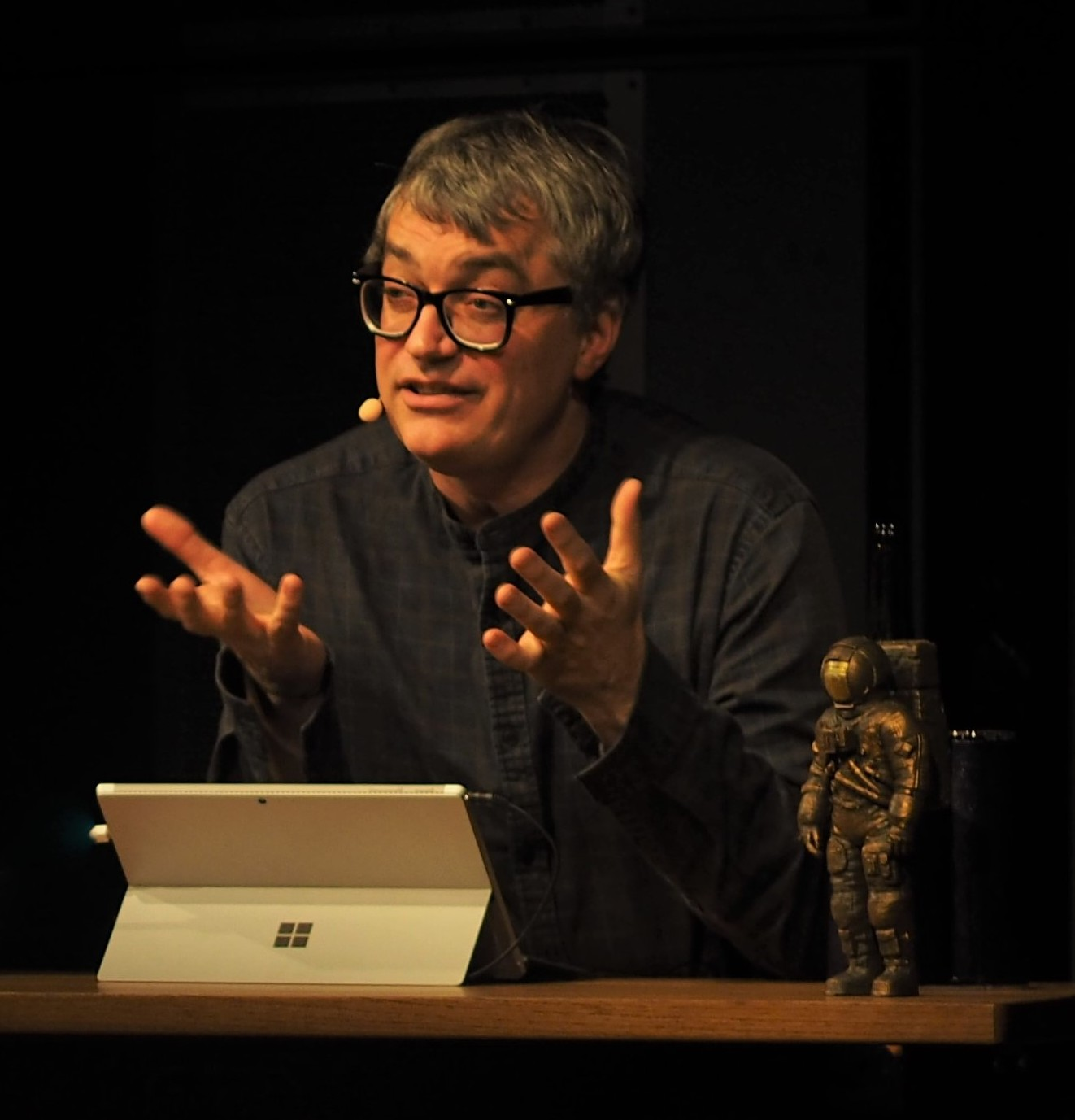
- Moore speaking at the KOSMOS center in Zurich 2017
- Awards: Winner of the first Leverhulme Prizes in 2001
- Scientific career
- Fields: Cosmology, gravity, astroparticle physics, planet formation, complex systems, supercomputing
- Thesis: Groups, clusters and superclusters of galaxies (1991)
- Doctoral advisor: Carlos Frenk
- Website: www.benmoore.ch

Ben Moore is an English professor of astrophysics, author, musician, and director of the Center for Theoretical Astrophysics and Cosmology at the University of Zürich. His research is focussed on cosmology, gravity, astroparticle physics, and planet formation. He has authored in excess of 200 scientific papers on the origin of planets and galaxies, as well as dark matter and dark energy. In his research, he simulates the universe using custom-built supercomputers.

== Biography ==
Moore gained his PhD from Durham University in 1991, and then spent several years as a research associate at the University of California, Berkeley and at the University of Washington, Seattle.

== Research ==
Moore and collaborators identified the cuspy halo problem and dwarf galaxy problem that persist in the cold dark matter paradigm. He also formulated a new mechanism for the origin of dwarf galaxies in clusters named galaxy harassment. Using numerical simulations he determined that Earth-Moon planetary systems are not rare. Moore and collaborators predicted that the first structures to form in the Universe were Earth-sized dark matter haloes which collapsed just 20 million years after the Big Bang.

== Books ==
He has written popular science books for adults and children, including:

- "Sternenstaub. Die Geschichte des Universums in 42 nie verliehenen Nobelpreisen"
- "Moon: Past, Present & Future"
- "Mond - eine Biografie"
- "Gibt es auf der dunklen Seite vom Mond Aliens?"
- "Elefanten im All"
- "Elephants in Space - The Past, the Present and Future of Life and the Universe"
- "Da draussen – Leben auf unserem Planeten und anderswo" (Out there, life on our planets and elsewhere) was also translated from German into Dutch ('Hallo daar! De zoektocht naar leven elders in het universum').

== Music ==
Under his artist name ‘Professor Moore’, he creates electro-rock music. He plays the guitar with the electro-rock band Milk67 and featured together with them in a float at the 2010 Zurich Street Parade. In 2014 he released a solo album called "Escape Velocity".

== Selected publications ==
- Elser, S; Meyer, M.R; Moore, B (2012). "On the origin of elemental abundances in the terrestrial planets". Icarus. 221 (2): 859. arXiv:1209.3635. Bibcode:2012Icar..221..859E. doi:10.1016/j.icarus.2012.09.016. S2CID 119280912.
- Graham, Alister W; Spitler, Lee R; Forbes, Duncan A; Lisker, Thorsten; Moore, Ben; Janz, Joachim (2012). "Leda 074886: A Remarkable Rectangular-Looking Galaxy". The Astrophysical Journal. 750 (2): 121. arXiv:1203.3608. Bibcode:2012ApJ...750..121G. doi:10.1088/0004-637X/750/2/121. S2CID 28425342.
- Elser, S; Moore, B; Stadel, J; Morishima, R (2011). "How common are Earth–Moon planetary systems?". Icarus. 214 (2): 357. arXiv:1105.4616. Bibcode:2011Icar..214..357E. doi:10.1016/j.icarus.2011.05.025. S2CID 30986434.
- Agertz, Oscar; Teyssier, Romain; Moore, Ben (2011). "The formation of disc galaxies in a ΛCDM universe". Monthly Notices of the Royal Astronomical Society. 410 (2): 1391. arXiv:1004.0005. Bibcode:2011MNRAS.410.1391A. doi:10.1111/j.1365-2966.2010.17530.x. S2CID 118805182.
- Morishima, Ryuji; Stadel, Joachim; Moore, Ben (2010). "From planetesimals to terrestrial planets: N-body simulations including the effects of nebular gas and giant planets". Icarus. 207 (2): 517. arXiv:1007.0579. Bibcode:2010Icar..207..517M. doi:10.1016/j.icarus.2009.11.038. S2CID 119290883.
- Diemand, J; Kuhlen, M; Madau, P; Zemp, M; Moore, B; Potter, D; Stadel, J (2008). "Clumps and streams in the local dark matter distribution". Nature. 454 (7205): 735–8. arXiv:0805.1244. Bibcode:2008Natur.454..735D. doi:10.1038/nature07153. PMID 18685701. S2CID 4321114.
- Moore, B; Diemand, J; Madau, P; Zemp, M; Stadel, J (2006). "Globular clusters, satellite galaxies and stellar haloes from early dark matter peaks". Monthly Notices of the Royal Astronomical Society. 368 (2): 563–570. arXiv:astro-ph/0510370. Bibcode:2006MNRAS.368..563M. doi:10.1111/j.1365-2966.2006.10116.x. S2CID 171983.
- Moore, Ben; Ghigna, Sebastiano; Governato, Fabio; Lake, George; Quinn, Thomas; Stadel, Joachim; Tozzi, Paolo (1999). "Dark Matter Substructure within Galactic Halos". The Astrophysical Journal. 524 (1): L19–L22. arXiv:astro-ph/9907411. Bibcode:1999ApJ...524L..19M. doi:10.1086/312287. S2CID 5644398.
- Moore, Ben; Katz, Neal; Lake, George; Dressler, Alan; Oemler, Augustus (1996). "Galaxy harassment and the evolution of clusters of galaxies". Nature. 379 (6566): 613. arXiv:astro-ph/9510034. Bibcode:1996Natur.379..613M. doi:10.1038/379613a0. S2CID 4303659.
- Diemand, J; Moore, B; Stadel, J (2005). "Earth-mass dark-matter haloes as the first structures in the early Universe". Nature. 433 (7024): 389–91. arXiv:astro-ph/0501589. Bibcode:2005Natur.433..389D. doi:10.1038/nature03270. PMID 15674284. S2CID 1852360.
