= George Efstathiou =

British astrophysicist (b. 1955)

George Efstathiou FRS
- Born: George Petros Efstathiou; 2 September 1955 (age 71)
- Education: Tottenham Grammar School; Keble College, Oxford (BA); University of Durham (PhD)
- Awards: Maxwell Medal and Prize (1990); Dannie Heineman Prize for Astrophysics (2005); Gruber Prize in Cosmology (2011); Hughes Medal (2015); Gold Medal of the Royal Astronomical Society (2022); Shaw Prize (2025)
- Scientific career
- Fields: Cosmology
- Workplaces: University of California Berkeley; Institute of Astronomy, Cambridge; University of Oxford
- Thesis: On the rotation and clustering of galaxies (1979)
- Doctoral advisor: Dick Fong
- Website: www.ast.cam.ac.uk/~gpe

George Petros Efstathiou FRS (/ɛfˈstæθ.juː/; born 2 September 1955) is a British astrophysicist who was Professor of Astrophysics at the University of Cambridge from 1997 to 2022, where he was also the first director of the Kavli Institute for Cosmology from 2008 to 2016. Prior to these appointments he was Savilian Professor of Astronomy at the University of Oxford.

Efstathiou was made a Fellow of the Royal Society in 1994. He received the 2011 Gruber Prize in Cosmology and the 2022 Gold Medal of the Royal Astronomical Society. As of 2025, his 400 published papers had been cited over 130,000 times.

== Early life and education ==
Efstathiou was born in London to Greek Cypriot immigrant parents who operated a fish and chip shop. Educated at Tottenham Grammar School, he dropped out at age 16, but continued to work as a lab technician. He later gained admission to Keble College, Oxford to read Physics, having combined work at the family business with A Level studies.

After graduating from Oxford with first class honours he moved to the University of Durham to gain his doctorate, where he was supervised by Richard 'Dick' Fong. At this time the Durham Physics Department had few people working in astronomy and Efstathiou was largely left to his own devices. He carried out some of the first computer simulations of the formation of cosmic structure, and was awarded his PhD in 1979.

== Career and research ==
Efstathiou was a research assistant in the Astronomy Department of University of California, Berkeley from 1979 to 1980, then moved to the Institute of Astronomy at the University of Cambridge, holding research fellowships at King's College, Cambridge from 1980 to 1988. He was appointed Savilian Professor of Astronomy at the University of Oxford in 1988, and held a fellowship at New College, Oxford. He was head of astrophysics between 1988 and 1994. He returned to Cambridge in 1997 as Professor of Astrophysics (1909) and a fellow of King's College. Efstathiou was director of the Institute of Astronomy between 2004 and 2008. He became the first director of the Kavli Institute for Cosmology in 2008.

Efstathiou's notable contributions to research in cosmology include:

- Pioneering the use of N-body computer simulations with Marc Davis, Carlos Frenk and Simon White. of cosmic structure formation.
- Carrying out the first detailed calculations of cosmic microwave background anisotropies in cold dark matter models with J. Richard Bond.
- Constructing the APM Galaxy Survey and measured large-scale galaxy clustering with Steve Maddox, Will Sutherland and Jon Loveday providing early evidence for the now-standard Lambda CDM model.
- Pioneering work on the 2dF Galaxy Redshift Survey, providing confirmation of dark energy using measurements of large-scale structure.
- Participating in the science team for the Planck spacecraft, which (as of 2015) provides the best measurements of the cosmic microwave background.

== Awards and honours ==
He was awarded the Maxwell Medal and Prize of the Institute of Physics in 1990. In 1994 he was both appointed a Fellow of the Royal Society (FRS), and was awarded the Bodossaki Foundation Academic and Cultural Prize for Astrophysics. Other awards include the Robinson Prize in Cosmology (Newcastle University, 1997) and the Dannie Heineman Prize for Astrophysics (American Institute of Physics and American Astronomical Society) in 2005, jointly with Simon White. He received the Gruber Prize in Cosmology for 2011 jointly with Marc Davis, Carlos Frenk and Simon White, the Nemitsas Prize in Physics for 2013 and the Hughes Medal of the Royal Society in 2015. In 2022 Efstathiou was awarded the Gold Medal of the Royal Astronomical Society, its highest honour, whose previous recipients include Albert Einstein, Edwin Hubble and Fred Hoyle. In January 2025, Durham University awarded Efstathiou an honorary degree. In 2025 he was awarded the Shaw Prize in Astronomy.
