= Guinevere Kauffmann =

American astrophysicist (born 1968)

- Born: Guinevere Alice Mei-Ing Kauffmann; 1968 (age 57–58); California
- Education: University of Cambridge
- Spouse: Simon White
- Children: 1
- Awards: Gottfried Wilhelm Leibniz Prize (2007)
- Scientific career
- Fields: Astrophysics
- Workplaces: MPI for Extraterrestrial Physics, MPI for Astrophysics
- Doctoral students: Gabriella De Lucia

Guinevere Alice Mei-Ing Kauffmann is an astrophysicist and best known for studying the physics of galaxies.

== Academic career ==
Kauffmann obtained a B.Sc.(Hons) in applied mathematics at the University of Cape Town in 1988 and an M.Sc. in astronomy in 1990. She obtained her Ph.D. in astronomy at the University of Cambridge in 1993, working with Simon White, whom she later married.

She was a member of the Miller Research Fellows program at the University of California, Berkeley, and was then employed as a postdoc at the Max Planck Institute for Extraterrestrial Physics and the Max Planck Institute for Astrophysics, both in Garching, Germany. She became head of a research team at the Max Planck Institute for Astrophysics in 2003. In 2013, she was appointed a Scientific Member of the Max Planck Society and Director (currently one of four) at the Max Planck Institute for Astrophysics.

Her research interests include models of galaxy formation; analysis of observed properties of galaxies, including their atomic and molecular gas; active galactic nuclei; and the Sloan Digital Sky Survey and other large spectroscopic surveys of galaxies.

From 2004 to 2008 Kauffmann coordinated "Multi-wavelength Analysis of Galaxy Populations" (MAGPOP) a Marie Curie Research Training Network of the European Union that brought together researchers from all over Europe for interdisciplinary projects.

== Awards ==
- In 1997, Guinevere Kauffmann received the Otto Hahn Medal.
- In 2002, she received the Heinz Maier-Leibnitz-Preis.
- In 2007, she received the Gottfried Wilhelm Leibniz Prize of the Deutsche Forschungsgemeinschaft, which is the highest honour awarded in German research.
- In 2009, she was elected to the American Academy of Arts and Sciences.
- In April 2010, she was awarded with the Order of Merit of the Federal Republic of Germany, with the Cross of Merit (on ribbon) and the certificate in the name of the German President. The award ceremony was carried out by Bavarian Prime Minister Horst Seehofer on 21 April 2010.
- In 2010, she was elected to the German Academy of Sciences Leopoldina.
- In 2012, she was elected to the National Academy of Sciences of the US.

== Bullying allegations ==
In February 2018, the German news magazine Spiegel Online published an article about abuse of power by senior scientists at the MPI for Astrophysics. Several emails obtained by BuzzFeed News Germany revealed in June 2018 that the allegations concerned MPA director Guinevere Kauffmann, who was accused of harassing and bullying students and scientists for years. Leaked emails published by BuzzFeed News Germany also include what has been described as racist, sexist and homophobic statements directed at employees and students. Responding to questions by the journal Nature, Kauffmann denied the accusations of racism, sexism and homophobia, claiming that she is merely interested in cultural differences between people and Buzzfeed had made severe errors. She conceded that as a student she was subject to "very high pressure supervision", acknowledging however that such a mentoring style "has now become unacceptable" and claiming to have changed her behavior substantially after complaints were received. This and other cases sparked a general debate about the abuse of power in science.

In August 2018, Science Magazine, as part of a longer article about bullying at a different Max Planck Institute, reported allegations of bullying and sexual harassment at the MPI for Astrophysics noting that Kauffmann had been accused of bullying, was receiving coaching and daily monitoring, and had been given a drastically reduced group to lead. In an interview with the German newspaper Frankfurter Allgemeine Zeitung, the president of the Max Planck Society admitted that these scandals had shown deficiencies in and the need for improvement of the Society's procedures for dealing with complaints.

== Selected publications ==
- Kauffmann, G.; White, S. D. M.; Guiderdoni, B. (1 September 1993). "The formation and evolution of galaxies within merging dark matter haloes". Monthly Notices of the Royal Astronomical Society. 264 (1). Oxford University Press (OUP): 201–218. Bibcode:1993MNRAS.264..201K. doi:10.1093/mnras/264.1.201. ISSN 0035-8711.
- Kauffmann, G.; Nusser, A.; Steinmetz, M. (21 April 1997). "Galaxy formation and large-scale bias". Monthly Notices of the Royal Astronomical Society. 286 (4): 795–811. arXiv:astro-ph/9512009. doi:10.1093/mnras/286.4.795. ISSN 0035-8711.
- Kauffmann, Guinevere; Charlot, Stéphane (1998). "Chemical enrichment and the origin of the colour—magnitude relation of elliptical galaxies in a hierarchical merger model". Monthly Notices of the Royal Astronomical Society. 294 (4): 705–717. arXiv:astro-ph/9704148. doi:10.1111/j.1365-8711.1998.01322.x. ISSN 0035-8711. S2CID 227170653.
- Kauffmann, G.; Haehnelt, M. (21 January 2000). "A unified model for the evolution of galaxies and quasars". Monthly Notices of the Royal Astronomical Society. 311 (3): 576–588. arXiv:astro-ph/9906493. Bibcode:2000MNRAS.311..576K. doi:10.1046/j.1365-8711.2000.03077.x. ISSN 0035-8711. S2CID 17081879..
- Kauffmann, Guinevere; Heckman, Timothy M.; Tremonti, Christy; Brinchmann, Jarle; Charlot, Stéphane; White, Simon D. M.; Ridgway, Susan E.; Brinkmann, Jon; Fukugita, Masataka; Hall, Patrick B.; Ivezić, Željko; Richards, Gordon T.; Schneider, Donald P. (2003). "The host galaxies of active galactic nuclei". Monthly Notices of the Royal Astronomical Society. 346 (4): 1055–1077. arXiv:astro-ph/0304239. Bibcode:2003MNRAS.346.1055K. doi:10.1111/j.1365-2966.2003.07154.x. ISSN 0035-8711. S2CID 122818863.
- Kauffmann, Guinevere; Heckman, Timothy M. (21 July 2009). "Feast and Famine: regulation of black hole growth in low-redshift galaxies". Monthly Notices of the Royal Astronomical Society. 397 (1). Oxford University Press (OUP): 135–147. arXiv:0812.1224. Bibcode:2009MNRAS.397..135K. doi:10.1111/j.1365-2966.2009.14960.x. ISSN 0035-8711. S2CID 13499035.
- Kauffmann, Guinevere; Li, Cheng; Fu, Jian; Saintonge, Amélie; Catinella, Barbara; Tacconi, Linda J.; Kramer, Carsten; Genzel, Reinhard; Moran, Sean; Schiminovich, David (9 March 2012). "COLD GASS, an IRAM legacy survey of molecular gas in massive galaxies - III. Comparison with semi-analytic models of galaxy formation". Monthly Notices of the Royal Astronomical Society. 422 (2). Oxford University Press (OUP): 997–1006. arXiv:1202.2972. Bibcode:2012MNRAS.422..997K. doi:10.1111/j.1365-2966.2012.20672.x. ISSN 0035-8711. S2CID 119214313.
- Kauffmann, G. (26 May 2014). "Quantitative constraints on starburst cycles in galaxies with stellar masses in the range 108-1010 M". Monthly Notices of the Royal Astronomical Society. 441 (3). Oxford University Press (OUP): 2717–2724. arXiv:1401.8091. doi:10.1093/mnras/stu752. ISSN 0035-8711.
- Kauffmann, Guinevere (8 October 2015). "Physical origin of the large-scale conformity in the specific star formation rates of galaxies". Monthly Notices of the Royal Astronomical Society. 454 (2). Oxford University Press (OUP): 1840–1847. arXiv:1508.02400. doi:10.1093/mnras/stv2113. ISSN 0035-8711.
- Kauffmann, Guinevere (30 July 2018). "Properties of AGNs selected by their mid-IR colours: evidence for a physically distinct mode of black hole growth". Monthly Notices of the Royal Astronomical Society. 480 (3). Oxford University Press (OUP): 3201–3214. arXiv:1808.03145. doi:10.1093/mnras/sty2029. ISSN 0035-8711.
