= Gillian Wilson =

British and American cosmologist

- Citizenship: British, American
- Education: Glasgow University (BSc); Durham University (PhD)
- Scientific career
- Fields: Cosmology
- Workplaces: University of California, Riverside; University of California, Merced
- Thesis: Gravitational lensing and galaxy clusters (1995)
- Doctoral advisor: Carlos Frenk

Gillian Wilson is a British-American astronomer and cosmologist.

Wilson joined University of California, Merced in October 2022 as Vice Chancellor for Research, Innovation and Economic Development and is also a Professor in the UC Merced Physics Department. She was formerly Professor of Physics and Astronomy at the University of California, Riverside, where she was also Senior Associate Vice Chancellor for Research & Economic Development.

== Biography ==
Wilson graduated with a BSc in Physics from Glasgow University in 1991. She completed her Ph.D. in 1995 at Durham University under the supervision of Carlos Frenk. Her research interests include infrared astronomy to study the evolution of galaxies, galaxy clusters and protoclusters, massive ancient galaxies, and the dynamics of star formation as galaxies age.

== Recognition ==
She was named a Fellow of the American Physical Society (APS) in 2021, after a nomination from the APS Division of Astrophysics, "for pioneering techniques and significant contributions to clusters of galaxies, massive galaxies and cosmology, as well as for sustained leadership in research administration, broadening participation and outreach". In 2023 the American Astronomical Society (AAS) named Wilson as a Fellow of the AAS, "for pioneering innovative techniques and significant contributions to interpreting the fundamental physics of galaxy clusters, massive galaxies, and cosmology; and for exceptional leadership in research administration, broadening participation, and outreach".
