= Singular isothermal sphere profile =

Parameterization

The singular isothermal sphere (SIS) profile is the simplest parametrization of the spatial distribution of matter in an astronomical system (e.g. galaxies, clusters of galaxies, etc.).

== Density distribution ==
$\rho(r) = \frac{\sigma_{V}^{2}}{2\pi G r^{2}}$

where σ_{V}^{2} is the velocity dispersion and G is the gravitational constant. The SIS profile is unphysical because of the singularity at zero radius and the fact that the total mass calculated by integrating the function out to infinite radius does not converge (i.e., is infinite). However, it is commonly utilized in the literature due to the simplicity of its form.

== See also ==
- Navarro-Frenk-White profile
