= Ryan Cooke =

Australian physicist

Ryan Cooke is an Australian physicist. He is Professor of Physics at the Durham University Department of Physics.

He was awarded the 2025 Gruber Prize in Cosmology jointly with Max Pettini, his former PhD supervisor. They received the award for work improving the Big Bang nucleosynthesis model through precise measurements of the deuterium-to-hydrogen ratio using data collected on quasars.
