= Selma de Mink =

Dutch astrophysicist

- Born: Selma de Mink
- Education: Utrecht University
- Awards: Pastoor Smeitsprize (2019); Merac Prize (2017)
- Scientific career
- Fields: astrophysics; stellar physics
- Thesis: Stellar evolution at low metallicity
- Doctoral advisor: Onno R. Pols
- Website: www.selmademink.com

Selma de Mink is a Dutch astrophysicist specializing in evolution of stars, stellar binary systems and compact objects, including black holes. She is a scientific director at the Max Planck Institute for Astrophysics in Garching near Munich, Germany.

== Early life and education ==
Selma de Mink was born in the Netherlands.

She graduated from Utrecht University in the Netherlands in 2010 with a Ph.D. in Astronomy, and in 2005 with an MSc in Astrophysics, BSc in Physics and BSc in Applied Math (all cum laude).

== Career ==
From 2019 to 2020 she was an associate professor at the Harvard University Astronomy Department, with appointments at the Center for Astrophysics | Harvard & Smithsonian (CfA) and Black Hole Initiative (BHI) at Harvard. As of 2021 she is scientific director of the stellar astrophysics department at the Max Planck Institute for Astrophysics (MPA) in Garching, Germany.

== Research ==
In a 2012 paper in Science, De Mink and her collaborators determined that binary merges are ubiquitous among massive stars (such as Type O stars), with 70% of massive stars exchanging mass at some point with a companion, resulting in binaries in a third of these cases. For this transformative work causing scientists to reassess the importance of binary stars in stellar evolution, De Mink has been featured in a number of popular science outlets, such as the Christian Science Monitor. De Mink also has widely recognized work on black hole mergers with Laser Interferometer Gravitational-Wave Observatory (LIGO) implications, as she explained how massive stars can get close enough to each other to form black hole binaries if they exchange enough material to form a homogeneous envelope.

== Awards ==
- 2019 - Pastoorsmeitsprize of the Nederlandse Astronoment Club and Kapteyn Fund
- 2017 - Merac Prize for Best Early Career Researcher in Theoretical Astrophysics
