= Illustris project =

Computer-simulated universes

The Illustris project is an ongoing series of astrophysical simulations run by an international collaboration of scientists. The aim is to study the processes of galaxy formation and evolution in the universe with a comprehensive physical model. Early results were described in a number of publications following widespread press coverage. The project publicly released all data produced by the simulations in April 2015. Key developers of the Illustris simulation have been Volker Springel (Max-Planck-Institut für Astrophysik) and Mark Vogelsberger (Massachusetts Institute of Technology). The Illustris simulation framework and galaxy formation model has been used for a wide range of spin-off projects, starting with Auriga and IllustrisTNG (both 2017) followed by Thesan (2021), MillenniumTNG (2022) and TNG-Cluster (2023).

== Illustris simulation ==
=== Overview ===
The original Illustris project was carried out by Mark Vogelsberger and collaborators as the first large-scale galaxy formation application of Volker Springel's novel Arepo code.

The Illustris project included large-scale cosmological simulations of the evolution of the universe, spanning initial conditions of the Big Bang, to the present day, 13.8 billion years later. Modeling, based on the most precise data and calculations currently available, are compared to actual findings of the observable universe in order to better understand the nature of the universe, including galaxy formation, dark matter and dark energy.

The simulation included many physical processes which are thought to be critical for galaxy formation. These include the formation of stars and the subsequent "feedback" due to supernova explosions, as well as the formation of super-massive black holes, their consumption of nearby gas, and their multiple modes of energetic feedback.

Images, videos, and other data visualizations for public distribution are available at official media page.

=== Computational aspects ===
The main Illustris simulation was run on the Curie supercomputer at CEA (France) and the SuperMUC supercomputer at the Leibniz Computing Centre (Germany). A total of 19 million CPU hours was required, using 8,192 CPU cores. The peak memory usage was approximately 25 TB of RAM. A total of 136 snapshots were saved over the course of the simulation, totaling over 230 TB cumulative data volume.

A computer program called "Arepo" was used to run the Illustris simulations. It was written by Volker Springel, the author of GADGET. The name is derived from the Sator Square. Arepo solves the coupled equations of gravity and hydrodynamics using a discretization of space based on a moving Voronoi tessellation. It is optimized for running on large, distributed memory supercomputers using an MPI approach.

=== Public data release ===
In April, 2015 (eleven months after the first papers were published) the project team publicly released all data products from all simulations. Data files include group catalogs of individual halos and subhalos, merger trees tracking these objects through time, full snapshot particle data at 135 distinct time points, and various supplementary data catalogs. In addition to direct data download, a web-based API allows for many common search and data extraction tasks to be completed without needing access to the full data sets.

=== German postage stamp ===
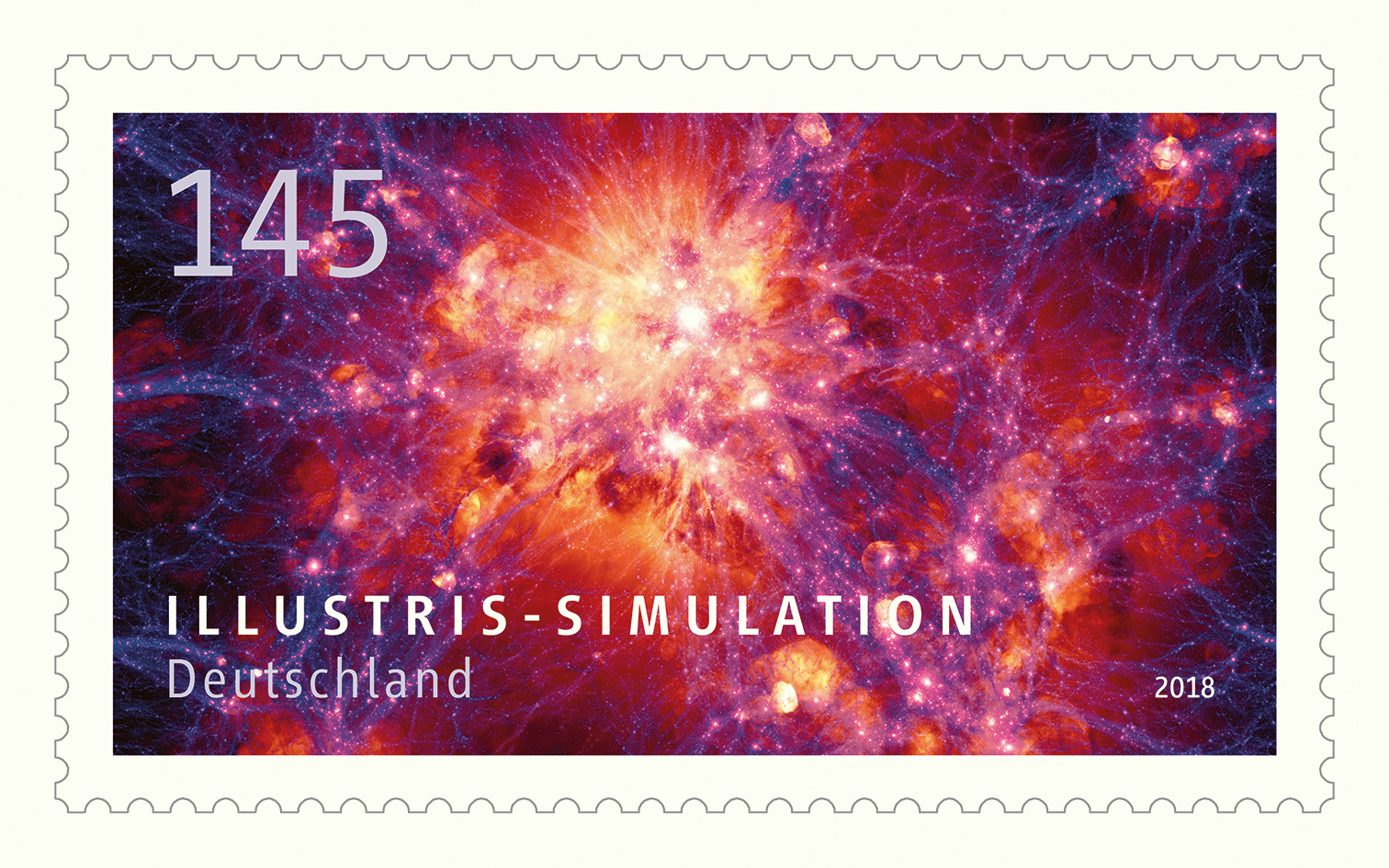
Stamp of German Postal Service recognizing the Illustris Simulation (2018)

In December 2018, the Illustris simulation was recognized by Deutsche Post through a special series of stamps.

== See also ==
- Computational fluid dynamics
- Large-scale structure of the universe
- List of cosmological computation software
- Millennium Run
- N-body simulation
- UniverseMachine
