= Max Pettini =

Italian-British astronomer

Max Pettini FRS (born 15 June 1949) is a Professor of observational astronomy at the Institute of Astronomy, University of Cambridge.

Pettini was born in Rome but studied for a BSc in Physics then a PhD in Astrophysics at University College London. Aside from four years at the Anglo-Australian Observatory in Epping, New South Wales from 1987 to 1991, his academic career has been based in the United Kingdom, and he holds British citizenship.

His early research obtained observational evidence that verified a prediction that the Milky Way is surrounded by a halo of hot ionised gas.

Pettini was awarded the Herschel Medal of the Royal Astronomical Society in 2008. In May 2010, he was elected a Fellow of the Royal Society. Together with Ryan Cooke, he was awarded the 2025 Gruber Prize in Cosmology. Pettini had previously supervised Cooke from 2008 to 2011, when the latter was completing his doctorate at Cambridge.
