= Julio Navarro (astrophysicist) =

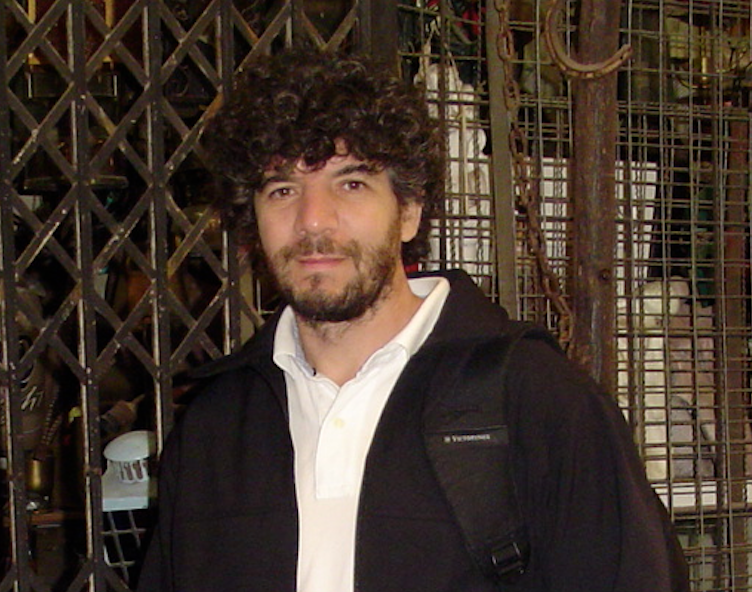
Portrait of Julio Navarro

Julio F. Navarro FRSC (born October 12, 1962 in Santiago del Estero, Argentina) is a professor of Astronomy (Ph.D. Universidad Nacional de Córdoba, Argentina) at the department of Physics and Astronomy in the University of Victoria. Navarro's research is mainly focused on the formation and evolution of galaxies and galaxy clusters and the structure and evolution of their dark matter component. He is known for his theoretical studies of dark matter halos carried out using massive N-body simulations. Navarro along with Carlos Frenk and Simon White has formulated a density profile for dark matter halos, which was named after them. In 2015, he won the Henry Marshall Tory Medal of the Royal Society of Canada. He is chief editor of the journal Frontiers in Astronomy and Space Sciences.
