= Particle mesh =

Particle Mesh (PM) is a computational method for determining the forces in a system of particles. These particles could be atoms, stars, or fluid components and so the method is applicable to many fields, including molecular dynamics and astrophysics. The basic principle is that the particle distribution is mapped onto a grid of density values. The potential is then solved for this density grid, and The force on each particle is calculated from the potential (or force field) at the particle’s position, typically using interpolation.

Various methods for converting a system of particles into a grid of densities exist. In the Nearest Grid Point (NGP) method, each particle deposits its entire mass onto the nearest grid point. In the Cloud-in-Cell (CIC) method, each particle contributes its mass to the surrounding grid points using linear weighting, and one particle can contribute mass to several neighbouring grid points.

Once the density distribution is found, the potential energy of each point in the mesh can be determined from the differential form of Gauss's law, which—after identifying the electric field E as the negative gradient of the electric potential Φ—gives rise to a Poisson equation that is easily solved after applying the Fourier transform. Thus it is faster to do a PM calculation than to simply add up all the interactions on a particle due to all other particles for two reasons: firstly, there are usually fewer grid points than particles, so the number of interactions to calculate is smaller, and secondly the grid technique permits the use of Fourier transform techniques to evaluate the potential, and these can be very fast.

PM is considered an obsolete method as it does not model close interaction between particles well. It has been supplanted by the Particle-Particle Particle-Mesh method, which uses a straight particle-particle sum between nearby particles in addition to the PM calculation.

== See also ==
- P3M
- Particle mesh method
- Particle mesh Ewald method
- Madelung constant
- Poisson summation formula
- Paul Peter Ewald
