= Lars Hernquist =

Theoretical astrophysicist

Lars Eric Hernquist
- Education: California Institute of Technology
- Known for: Hernquist Profile; Illustris project
- Awards: Gruber Prize in Cosmology (2020)
- Scientific career
- Fields: Astrophysics
- Workplaces: Harvard University; Center for Astrophysics | Harvard & Smithsonian; University of California, Santa Cruz
- Thesis: Thermal and Magnetic Properties of Neutron Stars (1985)
- Doctoral advisor: Roger Blandford
- Doctoral students: Gurtina Besla

Lars Hernquist (December 14, 1954) is a theoretical astrophysicist and Mallinckrodt Professor of Astrophysics at the Center for Astrophysics | Harvard & Smithsonian. He is best known for his research on dynamical processes in cosmology and galaxy formation/galaxy evolution.

== Career and research ==
Hernquist's research involves the dynamics of galaxies and the effect of a merger driven model for galaxy evolution. He is a world expert in simulating mergers of galaxies to demonstrate the expected appearance and morphology of the resulting body. He defined the "Hernquist Profile", which is an analytic expression for the distribution of dark matter in galaxies. Hernquist's research is largely computational with one of the world's largest supercomputers accessible for his research.

=== Awards ===
Hernquist was awarded the 2020 Gruber Prize in Cosmology jointly with Volker Springel, who together have made computer simulations "an indispensable tool for cosmologists, allowing them to test theories and locate fertile areas for further research."
