= MultiDark =

MultiDark (MULTImessenger Approach for DARK Matter Detection) is a Spanish project, with a stated goal of contributing to the identification and detection of dark matter.

== History ==
The project is a grouping effort, involving many researchers in the Spanish community with a special interest in dark matter. It began on 17 December 2009 and was funded for five years. The project is supported by Consolider-Ingenio, a programme of the Ministry of Economy and Finance.

== Goals ==
- To analyse in detail the most plausible candidates for dark matter.
- To investigate how they form the dark halos that are believed to surround galaxies.
- To contribute to the development of experiments to detect dark matter.
