= Eris (simulation) =

Computer simulation of the Milky Way

Eris is a computer simulation of the Milky Way galaxy's physics. It was done by astrophysicists from the Institute for Theoretical Physics at the University of Zurich, Switzerland and University of California, Santa Cruz. The simulation project was undertaken at the NASA Advanced Supercomputer Division's Pleiades and the Swiss National Supercomputing Centre for nearly eight months, which would have otherwise taken 570 years in a personal computer. The Eris simulation is the first successful detailed simulation of a Milky Way like galaxy. The results of the simulation were announced in August 2011.

== Background ==
Simulation projects intending to simulate spiral galaxies have been undertaken for the past 20 years. All of these projects had failed as the simulation results showed central bulges which are huge compared to the disk size.

== Simulation ==
The simulation was undertaken using supercomputers which include the Pleiades supercomputer, the Swiss National Supercomputing Centre and the supercomputers at the University of California, Santa Cruz. The simulation used 1.4 million processor-hours of the Pleiades supercomputer.

It is based on the theory that in the early universe, cold and slow moving dark matter particles clumped together. These dark matter clumps then formed the "scaffolding" around galaxies and galactic clusters. The motions of more than 60 million particles which represented dark matter and galactic gas were simulated for a period of 13 billion years. The software platform Gasoline was used for the simulation.

== Simulation results ==
The Eris simulation is the first successful simulation to have resolved the high-density gas clouds where stars formed. The simulation result consisted of a galaxy which is very similar to the Milky Way galaxy. Some of the parameters which were similar to Milky Way are stellar content, gas content, kinematic decomposition, brightness profile and the bulge-to-disk ratio.
