= Virgo Consortium =

The Virgo Consortium was founded in 1994 for Cosmological Supercomputer Simulations in response to the UK's High Performance Computing Initiative. Virgo developed rapidly into an international collaboration between a dozen scientists in the UK, Germany, Netherlands, Canada, United States and Japan.

== Nodes ==
The largest nodes are the Institute for Computational Cosmology in the UK and the Max Planck Institute for Astrophysics in Germany. Other nodes exist in the UK, Netherlands, Canada, USA and Japan.

== Science Goals ==
The science goals are to carry out state-of-the-art cosmological simulations with research areas in:

- The large-scale distribution of dark matter
- The formation of dark matter halos
- The formation and evolution of galaxies and clusters
- The physics of the intergalactic medium
- The properties of the intracluster gas

== Projects ==
- The Millennium Simulation
- Galaxy Simulations
- First Objects
- Dark Matter Halos
- Intergalactic Medium
- Semi-Analytical Galaxy Formation
- Hubble Volume
- Mock Catalogues
- GIF Project
- Evolution and Assembly of GaLaxies and their Environments (EAGLE)

=== The Millennium Simulation ===
This N-body simulation used more than 10 billion particles to trace the evolution of the matter distribution in a cubic region of the Universe over 2 billion light-years on a side. The first results that were published in 2005 in an issue of Nature, shows how comparing such simulated data to large observational surveys can improve the understanding of the physical processes underlying the buildup of real galaxies and black holes.

== Member Countries & Institutes ==
As of December 2023, the members are:

- Canada: University of Victoria
- Chile: University of La Serena
- China: National Astronomical Observatories of China
- Finland: University of Helsinki
- Germany: Max Planck Institute for Astrophysics and Leibniz Institute for Astrophysics Potsdam
- United Kingdom: Durham University, Liverpool John Moores University, University of Manchester, University of Nottingham and University of Sussex
- United States: Johns Hopkins University and UC Riverside
