= Volker Springel =

German astrophysicist

Volker Springel is a German astrophysicist. He is Director of Computational Astrophysics at the Max Planck Institute for Astrophysics in Garching.

Springel earned a degree in Physics from the University of Tübingen in 1996 and completed his PhD at LMU Munich in 1999. He is known in particular for his contributions to large-scale cosmological simulations; his 2005 paper on the Millennium Simulation has been cited more than 3,000 times and is the most cited astronomy paper ever published in Nature. In 2020, he shared the Gruber Prize in Cosmology with Lars Hernquist for their efforts to improve computational simulations. He won the Leibniz Prize the following year.
