= Max Planck Institute for Astrophysics =

Research institute located in Garching, Germany

Coordinates: 48°15′40″N 11°40′18″E

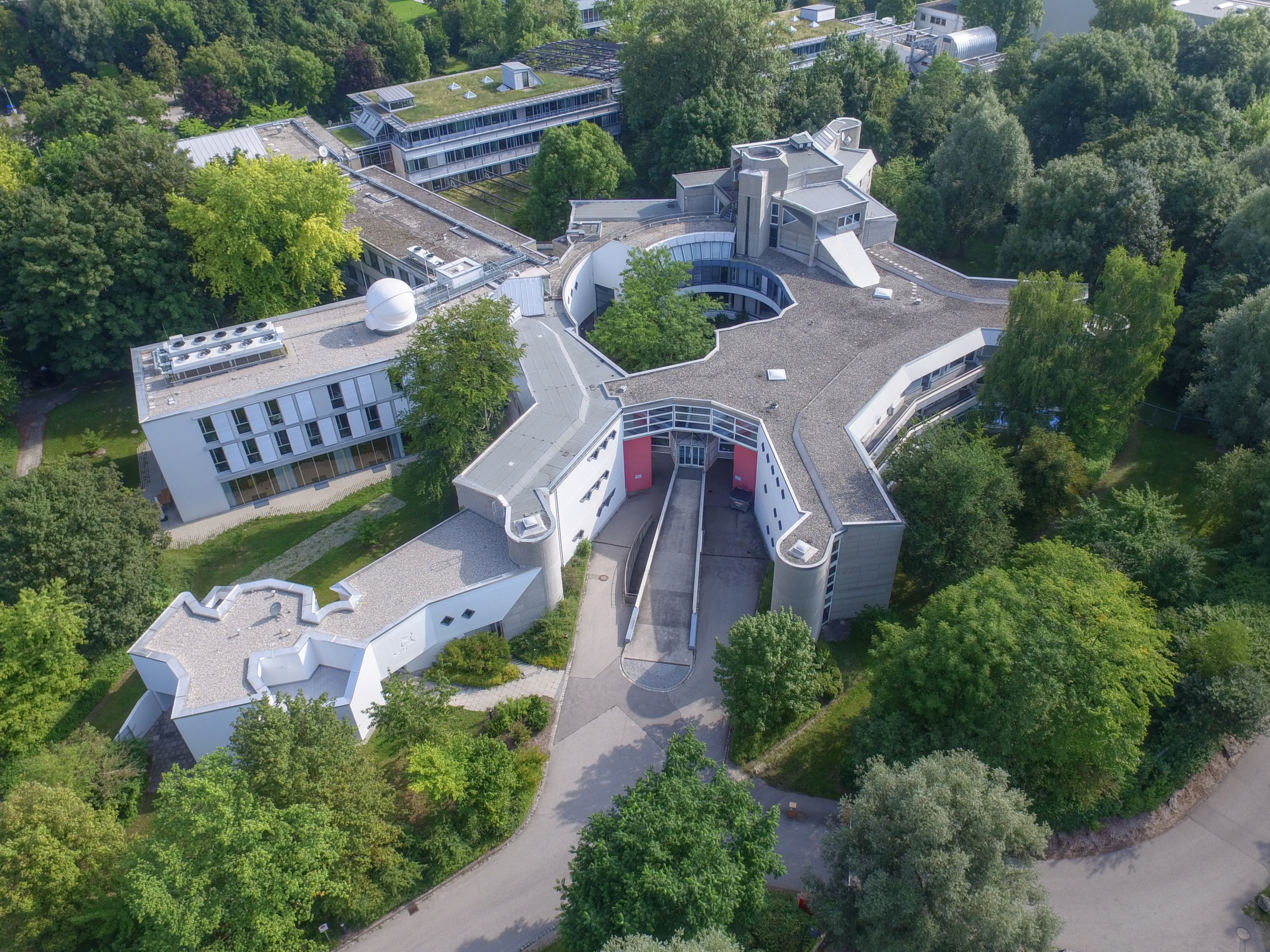
Max Planck Institute for Astrophysics in 2016

The Max Planck Institute for Astrophysics (MPA) is a research institute located in Garching, just north of Munich, Bavaria, Germany. It is one of many scientific research institutes belonging to the Max Planck Society.

The MPA is widely considered to be one of the leading institutions in the world for theoretical astrophysics research. According to Thomson Reuters, from 1999-2009 the Max Planck Society as a whole published more papers and accumulated more citations in the fields of physics and space science than any other research organization in the world.

== History ==
The Max Planck Society was founded on 26 February 1948. It effectively replaced the Kaiser Wilhelm Society for the Advancement of Science, which was dissolved after World War II. The society is named after Max Planck, one of the founders of quantum theory.

The MPA was founded as the Max Planck Institute for Physics and Astrophysics in 1958 and split into the Max Planck Institute for Astrophysics and the Max Planck Institute for Physics in 1991. In 1995, the numerical relativity group moved to the Max Planck Institute for Gravitational Physics.

== Organization ==
The MPA is one of several Max Planck Institutes that specialize in astronomy and astrophysics. Others are the Max Planck Institute for Extraterrestrial Physics in Garching (located next-door to the MPA), the Max Planck Institute for Astronomy in Heidelberg, the Max Planck Institute for Radio Astronomy in Bonn, the Max Planck Institute for Solar System Research in Göttingen, and the Max Planck Institute for Gravitational Physics (a.k.a. Albert Einstein Institute) in Golm.

The institute is located next-door to the MPI for Extraterrestrial Physics, as well as the headquarters of the European Southern Observatory. It also enjoys close working relationships with LMU Munich and the Technical University of Munich.

At any given time, the institute employs approximately 50 scientists, instructs over 30 PhD students, and hosts about 20 visiting scientists (some 60 visitors stay for longer than 2 weeks in any given year).

As of 2021, the four directors of the MPA are Selma de Mink, Guinevere Kauffmann, Eiichiro Komatsu, and Volker Springel.

Previous directors include Ludwig Biermann (1958 – 75), Rudolf Kippenhahn (1975 – 91), Simon White (1994 – 2019), Rashid Sunyaev (1995 – 2018), Wolfgang Hillebrandt (1997 – 2009) and Martin Asplund (2007 – 2011).

== Science ==
Focusing on theoretical investigations, the MPA covers a wide range of topics in astrophysics. These include:

- Cosmology, in particular galaxy formation and evolution, reionization, and the cosmic microwave background;
- High-energy astronomy and astrophysics, including supermassive black holes, galaxy clusters, active galactic nuclei and quasars, X-ray binaries, and accretion discs;
- Stellar physics, including stellar evolution and stellar explosions such as supernovae and gamma-ray bursts.

== Public outreach ==
The MPA works to explain astrophysical concepts and disseminate its findings to the public. These activities include popular science articles written by MPA scientists, events hosting school groups, events open to the general public, and monthly research highlights written for a general audience.

== Graduate program ==
The International Max Planck Research School (IMPRS) for Astrophysics is a graduate program offering a PhD in astrophysics. The school is a cooperation with LMU Munich and the Technical University of Munich.
