= N-body simulation =

Simulation of a dynamical system of particles

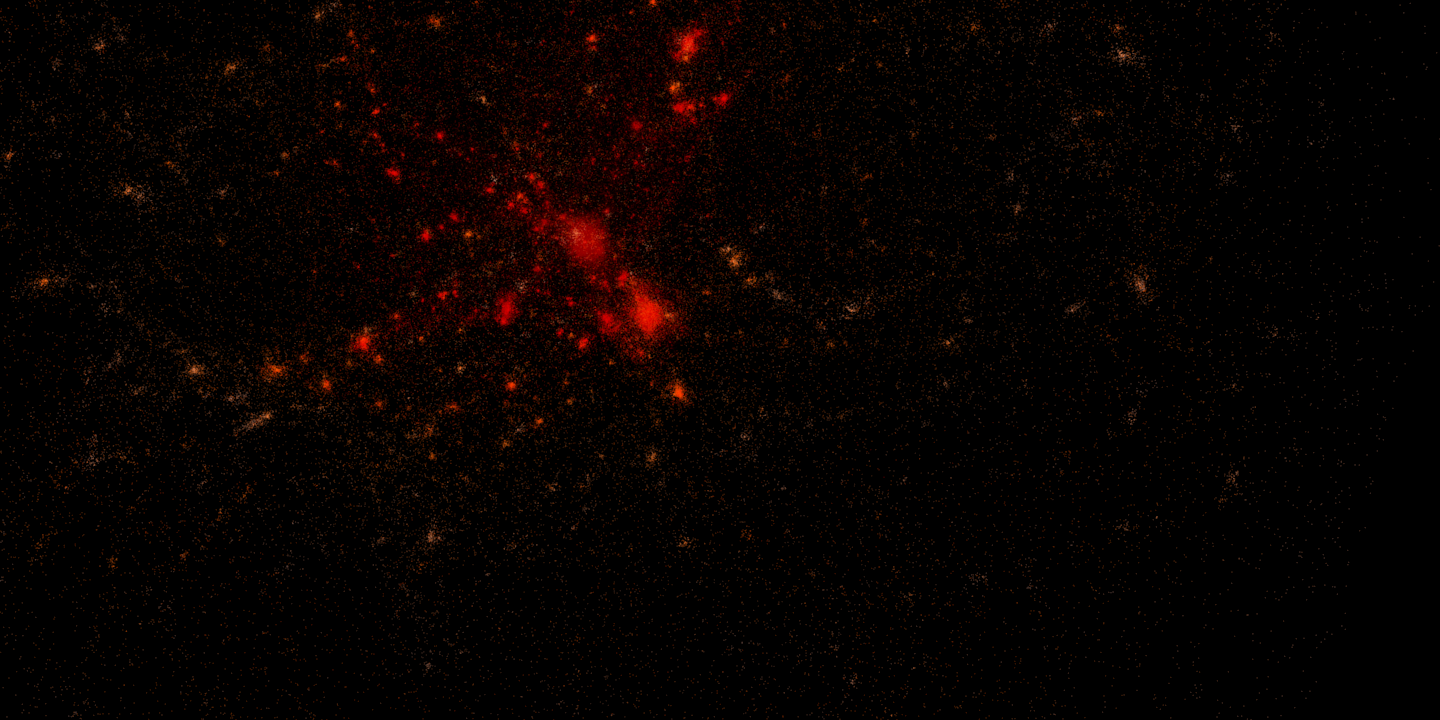
An n-body simulation of the cosmological formation of a cluster of galaxies in an expanding universe

In physics and astronomy, an n-body simulation is a simulation of a dynamical system of particles, usually under the influence of physical forces, such as gravity (see n-body problem for other applications). N-body simulations are widely used tools in astrophysics, from investigating the dynamics of few-body systems like the Earth-Moon-Sun system to understanding the evolution of the large-scale structure of the universe. In physical cosmology, N-body simulations are used to study processes of non-linear structure formation such as galaxy filaments and galaxy halos from the influence of dark matter. Direct N-body simulations are used to study the dynamical evolution of star clusters.

== Nature of the particles ==
The 'particles' treated by the simulation may or may not correspond to physical objects which are particulate in nature. For example, an N-body simulation of a star cluster might have a particle per star, so each particle has some physical significance. On the other hand, a simulation of a gas cloud cannot afford to have a particle for each atom or molecule of gas as this would require on the order of 10^{23} particles for each mole of material (see Avogadro constant), so a single 'particle' would represent some much larger quantity of gas (often implemented using Smoothed Particle Hydrodynamics). This quantity need not have any physical significance, but must be chosen as a compromise between accuracy and manageable computer requirements.

== Dark matter simulation ==
Dark matter plays an important role in the formation of galaxies. The time evolution of the density f (in phase space) of dark matter particles, can be described by the collisionless Boltzmann equation

$$\frac{d f}{d t} = \frac{\partial f}{\partial t}+ \mathbf{v} \cdot\nabla f -  \frac{\partial f}{\partial \mathbf{v}} \cdot\nabla\Phi$$

In the equation,$\mathbf{v}$ is the velocity, and Φ is the gravitational potential given by Poisson's Equation. These two coupled equations are solved in an expanding background Universe, which is governed by the Friedmann equations, after determining the initial conditions of dark matter particles. The conventional method employed for initializing positions and velocities of dark matter particles involves moving particles within a uniform Cartesian lattice or a glass-like particle configuration. This is done by using a linear theory approximation or a low-order perturbation theory.

== Direct gravitational N-body simulations ==
N-body simulation of 400 objects with parameters close to those of Solar System planets

In direct gravitational N-body simulations, the equations of motion of a system of N particles under the influence of their mutual gravitational forces are integrated numerically without any simplifying approximations. These calculations are used in situations where interactions between individual objects, such as stars or planets, are important to the evolution of the system.

The first direct gravitational N-body simulations were carried out by Erik Holmberg at the Lund Observatory in 1941, determining the forces between stars in encountering galaxies via the mathematical equivalence between light propagation and gravitational interaction: putting light bulbs at the positions of the stars and measuring the directional light fluxes at the positions of the stars by a photo cell, the equations of motion can be integrated with $O(N)$ effort. The first purely calculational simulations were then done by Sebastian von Hoerner at the Astronomisches Rechen-Institut in Heidelberg, Germany. Sverre Aarseth at the University of Cambridge (UK) dedicated his entire scientific life to the development of a series of highly efficient N-body codes for astrophysical applications which use adaptive (hierarchical) time steps, an Ahmad-Cohen neighbour scheme and regularization of close encounters. Regularization is a mathematical trick to remove the singularity in the Newtonian law of gravitation for two particles which approach each other arbitrarily close. Sverre Aarseth's codes are used to study the dynamics of star clusters, planetary systems and galactic nuclei.

== General relativity simulations ==
Many simulations are large enough that the effects of general relativity in establishing a Friedmann-Lemaitre-Robertson-Walker cosmology are significant. This is incorporated in the simulation as an evolving measure of distance (or scale factor) in a comoving coordinate system, which causes the particles to slow in comoving coordinates (as well as due to the redshifting of their physical energy). However, the contributions of general relativity and the finite speed of gravity can otherwise be ignored, as typical dynamical timescales are long compared to the light crossing time for the simulation, and the space-time curvature induced by the particles and the particle velocities are small. The boundary conditions of these cosmological simulations are usually periodic (or toroidal), so that one edge of the simulation volume matches up with the opposite edge.

== Calculation optimizations ==
N-body simulations are simple in principle, because they involve merely integrating the 6N ordinary differential equations defining the particle motions in Newtonian gravity. In practice, the number N of particles involved is usually very large (typical simulations include many millions, the Millennium simulation included ten billion) and the number of particle-particle interactions needing to be computed increases on the order of N^{2}, and so direct integration of the differential equations can be prohibitively computationally expensive. Therefore, a number of refinements are commonly used.

Numerical integration is usually performed over small timesteps using a method such as leapfrog integration. However all numerical integration leads to errors. Smaller steps give lower errors but run more slowly. Leapfrog integration is roughly 2nd order on the timestep, other integrators such as Runge–Kutta methods can have 4th order accuracy or much higher.

One of the simplest refinements is that each particle carries with it its own timestep variable, so that particles with widely different dynamical times don't all have to be evolved forward at the rate of that with the shortest time.

There are two basic approximation schemes to decrease the computational time for such simulations. These can reduce the computational complexity to O(N log N) or better, at the loss of accuracy.

=== Tree methods ===
In tree methods, such as a Barnes–Hut simulation, an octree is usually used to divide the volume into cubic cells and only interactions between particles from nearby cells need to be treated individually; particles in distant cells can be treated collectively as a single large particle centered at the distant cell's center of mass (or as a low-order multipole expansion). This can dramatically reduce the number of particle pair interactions that must be computed. To prevent the simulation from becoming swamped by computing particle-particle interactions, the cells must be refined to smaller cells in denser parts of the simulation which contain many particles per cell. For simulations where particles are not evenly distributed, the well-separated pair decomposition methods of Callahan and Kosaraju yield optimal O(n log n) time per iteration with fixed dimension.

=== Particle mesh method ===
Another possibility is the particle mesh method in which space is discretised on a mesh and, for the purposes of computing the gravitational potential, particles are assumed to be divided between the surrounding 2x2 vertices of the mesh. The potential energy Φ can be found with the Poisson equation

$$\nabla^2\Phi=4\pi G{\rho},\,$$

where G is Newton's constant and $\rho$ is the density (number of particles at the mesh points). The fast Fourier transform can solve this efficiently by going to the frequency domain where the Poisson equation has the simple form

$$\hat{\Phi}= -4\pi G\frac{\hat{\rho}}{k^2},$$

where $\vec{k}$ is the comoving wavenumber and the hats denote Fourier transforms. Since $\vec{g} = -\vec{\nabla}\Phi$, the gravitational field can now be found by multiplying by $-i\vec{k}$ and computing the inverse Fourier transform (or computing the inverse transform and then using some other method). Since this method is limited by the mesh size, in practice a smaller mesh or some other technique (such as combining with a tree or simple particle-particle algorithm) is used to compute the small-scale forces. Sometimes an adaptive mesh is used, in which the mesh cells are much smaller in the denser regions of the simulation.

=== Special-case optimizations ===
Several different gravitational perturbation algorithms are used to get fairly accurate estimates of the path of objects in the Solar System.

People often decide to put a satellite in a frozen orbit. The path of a satellite closely orbiting the Earth can be accurately modeled starting from the 2-body elliptical orbit around the center of the Earth, and adding small corrections due to the oblateness of the Earth, gravitational attraction of the Sun and Moon, atmospheric drag, etc. It is possible to find a frozen orbit without calculating the actual path of the satellite.

The path of a small planet, comet, or long-range spacecraft can often be accurately modeled starting from the 2-body elliptical orbit around the Sun, and adding small corrections from the gravitational attraction of the larger planets in their known orbits.

Some characteristics of the long-term paths of a system of particles can be calculated directly. The actual path of any particular particle does not need to be calculated as an intermediate step. Such characteristics include Lyapunov stability, Lyapunov time, various measurements from ergodic theory, etc.

== Two-particle systems ==
Although there are millions or billions of particles in typical simulations, they typically correspond to a real particle with a very large mass, typically 10^{9} solar masses. This can introduce problems with short-range interactions between the particles such as the formation of two-particle binary systems. As the particles are meant to represent large numbers of dark matter particles or groups of stars, these binaries are unphysical. To prevent this, a softened Newtonian force law is used, which does not diverge as the inverse-square radius at short distances. Most simulations implement this quite naturally by running the simulations on cells of finite size. It is important to implement the discretization procedure in such a way that particles always exert a vanishing force on themselves.

=== Softening ===
Softening is a numerical trick used in N-body techniques to prevent numerical divergences when a particle comes too close to another (and the force goes to infinity). This is obtained by modifying the regularized gravitational potential of each particle as

$$\Phi = - \frac{1}{\sqrt{r^2 + \epsilon^2}},$$

(rather than 1/r) where $\epsilon$ is the softening parameter. The value of the softening parameter should be set small enough to keep simulations realistic.

== Results from N-body simulations ==
N-body simulations give findings on the large-scale dark matter distribution and the structure of dark matter halos. According to simulations of cold dark matter, the overall distribution of dark matter on a large scale is not entirely uniform. Instead, it displays a structure resembling a network, consisting of voids, walls, filaments, and halos. Also, simulations show that the relationship between the concentration of halos and factors such as mass, initial fluctuation spectrum, and cosmological parameters is linked to the actual formation time of the halos. In particular, halos with lower mass tend to form earlier, and as a result, have higher concentrations due to the higher density of the Universe at the time of their formation. Shapes of halos are found to deviate from being perfectly spherical. Typically, halos are found to be elongated and become increasingly prolate towards their centers. However, interactions between dark matter and baryons would affect the internal structure of dark matter halos. Simulations that model both dark matters and baryons are needed to study small-scale structures.

== Incorporating baryons, leptons and photons into simulations ==
Many simulations simulate only cold dark matter, and thus include only the gravitational force. Incorporating baryons, leptons and photons into the simulations dramatically increases their complexity and often radical simplifications of the underlying physics must be made. However, this is an extremely important area and many modern simulations are now trying to understand processes that occur during galaxy formation which could account for galaxy bias.

== Computational complexity ==
Reif and Tate prove that if the n-body reachability problem is defined as follows – given n bodies satisfying a fixed electrostatic potential law, determining if a body reaches a destination ball in a given time bound where we require a poly(n) bits of accuracy and the target time is poly(n) is in PSPACE.

On the other hand, if the question is whether the body eventually reaches the destination ball, the problem is PSPACE-hard. These bounds are based on similar complexity bounds obtained for ray tracing.

== Example simulations ==
=== Common boilerplate code ===
The simplest implementation of N-body simulations where $n\geq 3$ is a naive propagation of orbiting bodies; naive implying that the only forces acting on the orbiting bodies is the gravitational force which they exert on each other. In object-oriented programming languages, such as C++, some boilerplate code is useful for establishing the fundamental mathematical structures as well as data containers required for propagation; namely state vectors, and thus vectors, and some fundamental object containing this data, as well as the mass of an orbiting body. This method is applicable to other types of N-body simulations as well; a simulation of point masses with charges would use a similar method, however the force would be due to attraction or repulsion by interaction of electric fields. Regardless, acceleration of particle is a result of summed force vectors, divided by the mass of the particle:

$$\vec{a} = \frac{1}{m} \sum\vec{F}$$

An example of a programmatically stable and scalable method for containing kinematic data for a particle is the use of fixed length arrays, which in optimised code allows for easy memory allocation and prediction of consumed resources; as seen in the following C++ code:

struct Vector3
{
    double e[3] = { 0 };

    Vector3() {}
    ~Vector3() {}

    inline Vector3(double e0, double e1, double e2)
    {
        this->e[0] = e0;
        this->e[1] = e1;
        this->e[2] = e2;
    }
};

struct OrbitalEntity
{
    double e[7] = { 0 };

    OrbitalEntity() {}
    ~OrbitalEntity() {}

    inline OrbitalEntity(double e0, double e1, double e2, double e3, double e4, double e5, double e6)
    {
        this->e[0] = e0;
        this->e[1] = e1;
        this->e[2] = e2;
        this->e[3] = e3;
        this->e[4] = e4;
        this->e[5] = e5;
        this->e[6] = e6;
    }
};

Note that OrbitalEntity contains enough room for a state vector, where:

- $e_{0} = x$, the projection of the objects position vector in Cartesian space along $\left[1\;0\;0\right]$
- $e_{1} = y$, the projection of the objects position vector in Cartesian space along $\left[0\;1\;0\right]$
- $e_{2} = z$, the projection of the objects position vector in Cartesian space along $\left[0\;0\;1\right]$
- $e_{3} = \dot{x}$, the projection of the objects velocity vector in Cartesian space along $\left[1\;0\;0\right]$
- $e_{4} = \dot{y}$, the projection of the objects velocity vector in Cartesian space along $\left[0\;1\;0\right]$
- $e_{5} = \dot{z}$, the projection of the objects velocity vector in Cartesian space along $\left[0\;0\;1\right]$

Additionally, OrbitalEntity contains enough room for a mass value.

=== Initialisation of simulation parameters ===
Commonly, N-body simulations will be systems based on some type of equations of motion; of these, most will be dependent on some initial configuration to "seed" the simulation. In systems such as those dependent on some gravitational or electric potential, the force on a simulation entity is independent on its velocity. Hence, to seed the forces of the simulation, merely initial positions are needed, but this will not allow propagation- initial velocities are required. Consider a planet orbiting a star- it has no motion, but is subject to gravitational attraction to its host star. As a time progresses, and time steps are added, it will gather velocity according to its acceleration. For a given instant in time, $t_{n}$, the resultant acceleration of a body due to its neighbouring masses is independent of its velocity, however, for the time step $t_{n+1}$, the resulting change in position is significantly different due the propagation's inherent dependency on velocity. In basic propagation mechanisms, such as the symplectic euler method to be used below, the position of an object at $t_{n+1}$ is only dependent on its velocity at $t_{n}$, as the shift in position is calculated via

$$\vec{r}_{t_{n+1}}=\vec{r}_{t_{n}}+\vec{v}_{t_{n}} \cdot \Delta t$$

Without acceleration, $\vec{v}_{t_{n}}$ is static, however, from the perspective of an observer seeing only position, it will take two time steps to see a change in velocity.

A solar-system-like simulation can be accomplished by taking average distances of planet equivalent point masses from a central star. To keep code simple, a non-rigorous approach based on semi-major axes and mean velocities will be used. Memory space for these bodies must be reserved before the bodies are configured; to allow for scalability, a malloc command may be used:

OrbitalEntity* orbital_entities = malloc(sizeof(OrbitalEntity) * (9 + N_ASTEROIDS));

orbital_entities[0] = { 0.0,0.0,0.0,        0.0,0.0,0.0,      1.989e30 };   // a star similar to the sun
orbital_entities[1] = { 57.909e9,0.0,0.0,   0.0,47.36e3,0.0,  0.33011e24 }; // a planet similar to mercury
orbital_entities[2] = { 108.209e9,0.0,0.0,  0.0,35.02e3,0.0,  4.8675e24 };  // a planet similar to venus
orbital_entities[3] = { 149.596e9,0.0,0.0,  0.0,29.78e3,0.0,  5.9724e24 };  // a planet similar to earth
orbital_entities[4] = { 227.923e9,0.0,0.0,  0.0,24.07e3,0.0,  0.64171e24 }; // a planet similar to mars
orbital_entities[5] = { 778.570e9,0.0,0.0,  0.0,13e3,0.0,     1898.19e24 }; // a planet similar to jupiter
orbital_entities[6] = { 1433.529e9,0.0,0.0, 0.0,9.68e3,0.0,   568.34e24 };  // a planet similar to saturn
orbital_entities[7] = { 2872.463e9,0.0,0.0, 0.0,6.80e3,0.0,   86.813e24 };  // a planet similar to uranus
orbital_entities[8] = { 4495.060e9,0.0,0.0, 0.0,5.43e3,0.0,   102.413e24 }; // a planet similar to neptune

where N_ASTEROIDS is a variable which will remain at 0 temporarily, but allows for future inclusion of significant numbers of asteroids, at the users discretion. A critical step for the configuration of simulations is to establish the time ranges of the simulation, $t_{0}$ to $t_\text{end}$, as well as the incremental time step $dt$ which will progress the simulation forward:

double t_0 = 0;
double t = t_0;
double dt = 86400;
double t_end = 86400 * 365 * 10; // approximately a decade in seconds
double BIG_G = 6.67e-11; // gravitational constant

The positions and velocities established above are interpreted to be correct for $t = t_{0}$.

The extent of a simulation would logically be for the period where $t_{0}\leq t < t_\text{end}$.

=== Propagation ===
An entire simulation may consist of countless time steps. At the elementary level, each time step involves calculating, for each body:

- the forces on the body;
- acceleration ($\vec{a}$);
- velocity ($\vec{v}_{n} = \vec{v}_{n-1} + \vec{a}_{n} \cdot \Delta t$);
- and position ($\vec{r}_{n+1} = \vec{r}_{n} + \vec{v}_{n} \cdot \Delta t$).

The above can be implemented quite simply with a while loop which continues while $t$ exists in the aforementioned range:

while (t < t_end)
{
    for (size_t m1_idx = 0; m1_idx < 9 + N_ASTEROIDS; m1_idx++)
    {       
        Vector3 a_g = { 0,0,0 };

        for (size_t m2_idx = 0; m2_idx < 9 + N_ASTEROIDS; m2_idx++)
        {
            if (m2_idx != m1_idx)
            {
                Vector3 r_vector;

                r_vector.e[0] = orbital_entities[m1_idx].e[0] - orbital_entities[m2_idx].e[0];
                r_vector.e[1] = orbital_entities[m1_idx].e[1] - orbital_entities[m2_idx].e[1];
                r_vector.e[2] = orbital_entities[m1_idx].e[2] - orbital_entities[m2_idx].e[2];

                double r_mag = sqrt(
                        r_vector.e[0] * r_vector.e[0]
                      + r_vector.e[1] * r_vector.e[1]
                      + r_vector.e[2] * r_vector.e[2]);

                double acceleration = -1.0 * BIG_G * (orbital_entities[m2_idx].e[6]) / pow(r_mag, 2.0);

                Vector3 r_unit_vector = { r_vector.e[0] / r_mag, r_vector.e[1] / r_mag, r_vector.e[2] / r_mag };

                a_g.e[0] += acceleration * r_unit_vector.e[0];
                a_g.e[1] += acceleration * r_unit_vector.e[1];
                a_g.e[2] += acceleration * r_unit_vector.e[2];
            }
        }

        orbital_entities[m1_idx].e[3] += a_g.e[0] * dt;
        orbital_entities[m1_idx].e[4] += a_g.e[1] * dt;
        orbital_entities[m1_idx].e[5] += a_g.e[2] * dt;
    }

    for (size_t entity_idx = 0; entity_idx < 9 + N_ASTEROIDS; entity_idx++)
    {
        orbital_entities[entity_idx].e[0] += orbital_entities[entity_idx].e[3] * dt;
        orbital_entities[entity_idx].e[1] += orbital_entities[entity_idx].e[4] * dt;
        orbital_entities[entity_idx].e[2] += orbital_entities[entity_idx].e[5] * dt;
    }
    
    t += dt;
}

Focusing on the inner four rocky planets in the simulation, the trajectories resulting from the above propagation is shown below:

== See also ==
- Millennium Run – Computer simulation of the universe
- Large-scale structure of the cosmos – Concept in cosmology
- GADGET – Computer software for cosmological simulations
- Galaxy formation and evolution – Subfield of cosmology
- Natural units – Units of measurement based on universal physical constants
- Virgo Consortium
- Barnes–Hut simulation – Approximation algorithm for the n-body problem
- Bolshoi cosmological simulation – Computer simulation of the universe
