= Deltiology =

Study and collection of postcards

Deltiology (from Greek δελτίον, deltion, diminutive of δέλτος, deltos, "writing tablet, letter"; and -λογία, -logia) is the study and collection of postcards. The word originated in 1945 from the collaboration of Rendell Rhoades (1914–1976) of Ohio and colleagues at Ohio State University.

A biographical sketch of Rhoades's life by his wife Nancy was provided to the Canadian Friends (Quaker) Historical Association in 1994. Rhoades had responded to a contest by editor Bob Hendricks in Post Card Collectors Magazine to create a more scholarly name for the hobby of postcard collecting. 'Philocartist' was a term used in the early 1900s, possibly coined by the noted early philatelist Fred Melville in his 1903 publication The A.B.C. of Stamp Collecting.

In Vol. 3, No. 1, January 1945, the headline of Post Card Collectors Magazine read: "Official P.C. Name Disclosed thru Research" and continued "Thru the splendid efforts of careful research by Rendell Rhoades, (of Blanchester, Ohio) the authentic and official name of the Postcard Collectors has been discovered. Mr Rhoades is a Research Associate for Ohio State University, and upon being challenged to find a name for the Postcard Collectors thru several contests held by this magazine as well as by William Morris of New York City, he contacted Dr K.M. Abbott and Mrs Ethel Miller, two well-known authorities on word formation." They identified a word from the Greek language: "deltion" meaning small illustrated tablet, or card."

However, it took about twenty years for deltiology/deltiologist to first appear in a dictionary. Compared to philately, the identification of a postcard's place and time of production can often be an impossible task because postcards, unlike stamps, are produced in a decentralised, unregulated manner. For this reason, some collectors choose to limit their acquisitions to cards by specific artists and publishers, or by time and location.

== History ==
Deltiology appeared at the end of the 19th century, when the mass production of postcards began and received international distribution as the cheapest type of postal items. The first postcard was published in 1869, and by 1875, 231.5 million open letters were sent in the member countries of the Universal Postal Union.

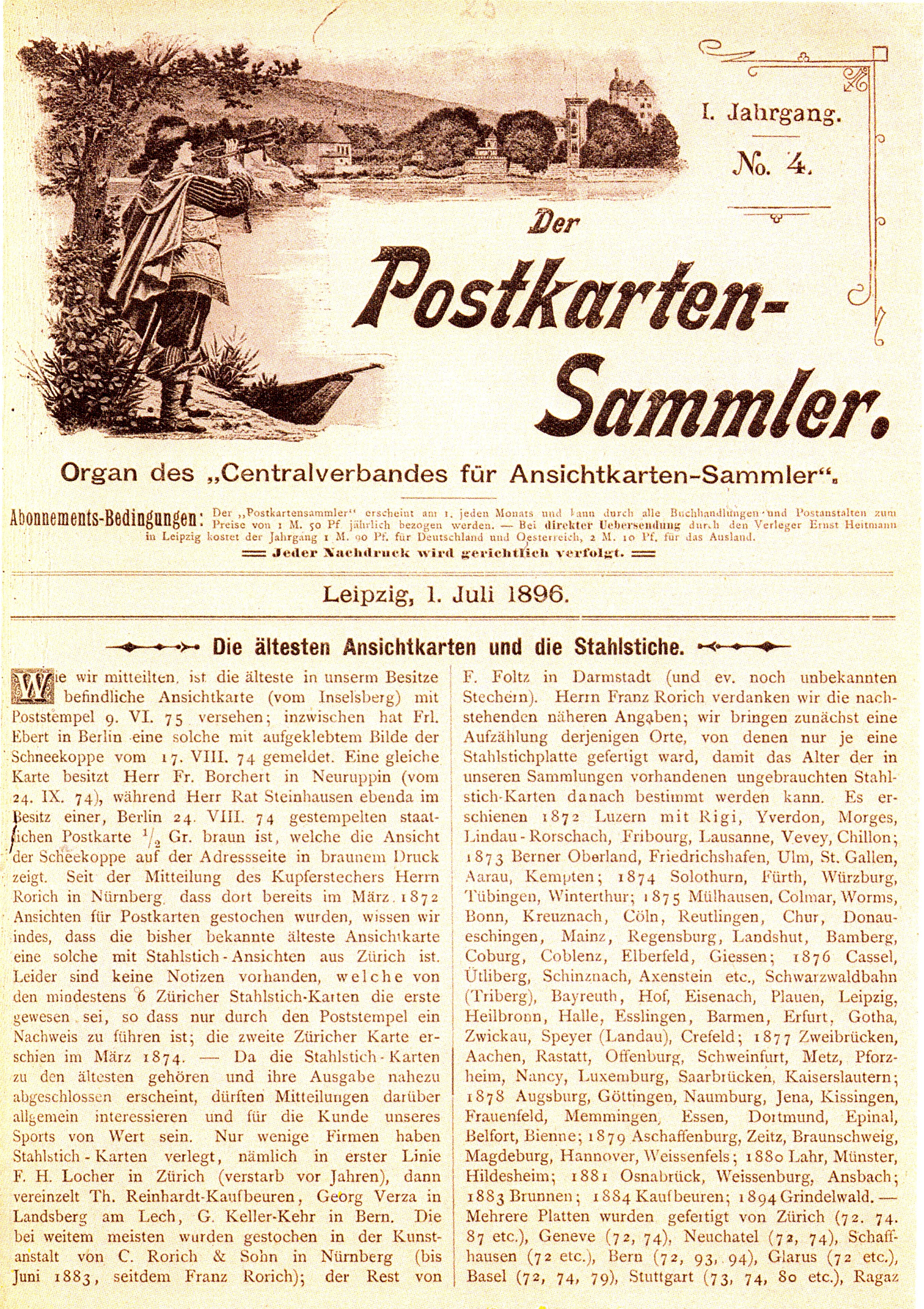
German magazine for postcard collectors, published in Leipzig by Central Union of Postcard Collectors (issue 1 july 1896)

In the late 19th to early 20th centuries, the first organizations of deltiologists appeared. Special magazines and catalogs began to be published (in Germany, Austria-Hungary, France, Russia, Great Britain, the United States, Italy, Switzerland, Spain, etc.), international exhibitions took place (in Leipzig, Saint Petersburg, Nice, Paris, Florence, Nuremberg, London, etc.), congresses of collectors and postcard publishers (in Leipzig - 1896, 1910; in Nice - 1899), the first auctions began to be held.

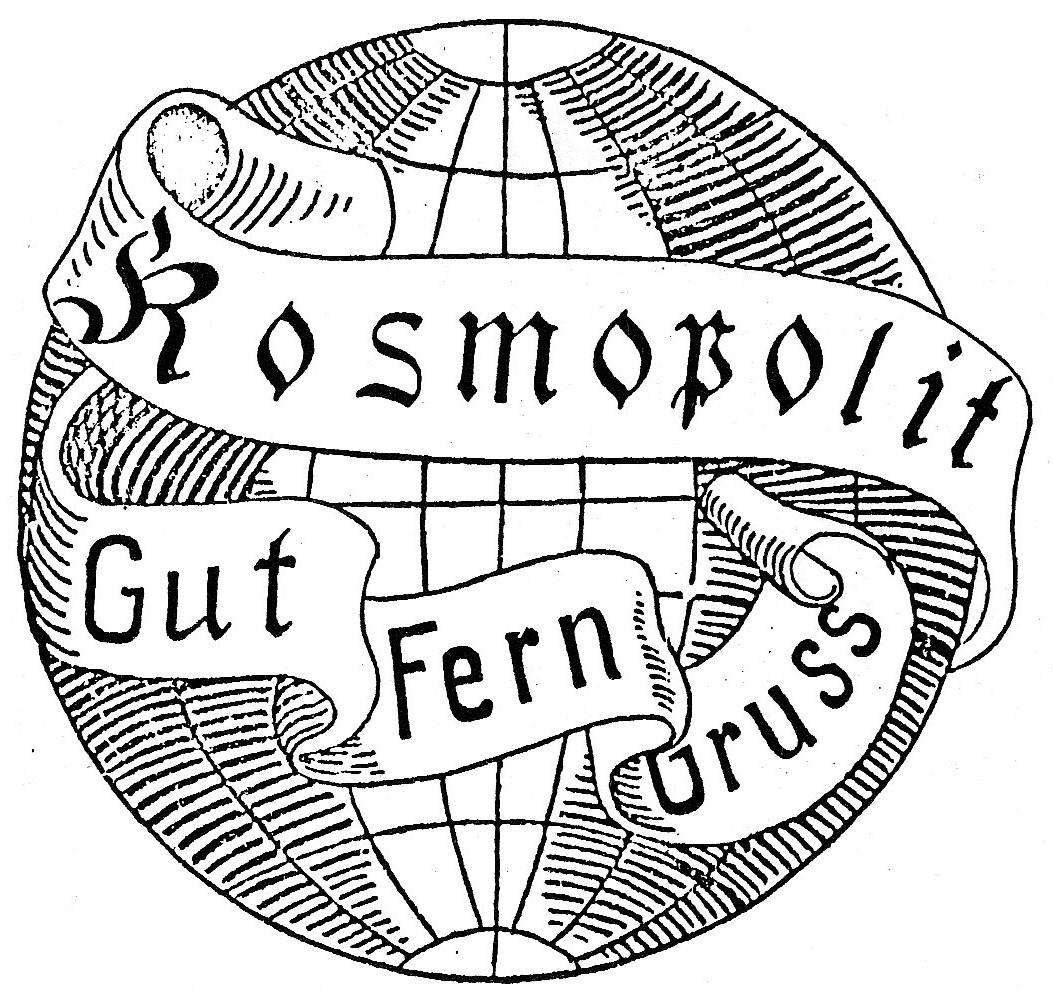
The emblem of International Deltiologist Union «Kosmopolit» (till 1900)

Since the beginning of the 20th century, deltiology has become one of the most popular types of collecting, facilitated by the mass production of postcards of diverse topics (geography, ethnography, history, various types of art, technology, sports, portraits, etc.) and of high-quality art and printings, and by postal exchange between countries which expanded significantly with the strengthening of international relations.

The initial views on deltiology were somewhat different from the ones we have today. At the beginning of the 20th century, it was believed that only a postcard that had been mailed, and thus “fulfilled its function”, could be a worthy collectible. Moreover, many collectors would only be interested in a postcard with a view of a city or locality if it had been mailed from that city or locality. A blank postcard without a postmark was equated to a simple “picture”. Today, however, some collectors actually ignore cards with writing on them.

Deltiology is one of the most popular types of collecting. Postcards are usually valued in proportion to their age and rarity of their subject. Recently, an increased demand for postcards has provoked an increase in prices. For example, the price of certain scarce or historically significant postcards at online auctions can reach $1000, while most postcards would not reach $5.

== Identification ==
There are some general rules to determining when a postcard was printed. Postcards are generally sent within a few years of their printing, so the postmark helps date a postcard. If the card is original and not a reprint, a postcard's original printing date can be deduced from such things as the fashions worn by people in the card, the era in which the cars on the street were made, and other time-sensitive clues. Postcards produced by the Curt Teich Company can be dated more exactly using the company-printed date code on the view side or within the stamp box if visible.

Vintage picture postcards are described as being from the "Golden Age of Postcards," which was generally 1898–1919. Modern 'chromes' are color photographs and thus differ from photochromes generated from black and white photographs before c. 1915. Picture postcards are also differentiated based on other features: undivided backs are typical for c. 1901–1906 in the United States, prior to 1904 in Canada, and other years in other countries. Divided backs followed undivided backs: c. United States 1907, while white border cards are common from c. 1915–1930. The time of the linens was circa 1930–1950, and modern chromes appeared after 1940.

== Practice ==
Postcards are collected by historical societies, libraries and genealogical societies because of their importance in research, such as how a city looked at a particular time in history and social history. Many elementary schools use postcards to teach children geography. Postcard pen pal programs have been established to help children in language arts.

Deltiologists collect for various reasons. Some are attracted to the postcards themselves, then narrow down their interests. Others are interested in something in particular, such as ballet, and decide to collect ballet-related postcards to augment their interest in ballet.

Collectors may find picture postcards at home in boxes, attics, or scrapbooks, generate their own on trips and vacations, and acquire them from stores, flea markets, purchasing on the Internet, or other collectors.

A number of artists have become recognized for the creation of postcards, and certain publishers specialize in the production and printing of picture postcards.

== Worldwide popularity ==
Worldwide, deltiology is the third-largest collecting hobby after stamp collecting and coin/banknote collecting. Postcard clubs may be found in many countries, and these clubs, as well as related organizations, frequently host postcard shows. Online postcard clubs have also become popular. They mainly focus on providing their members with catalogs and features for tracking their collections and interacting with each other.

Some websites popularize deltiology by providing opportunities to receive and send postcards to random people around the world.

== Collection storage ==
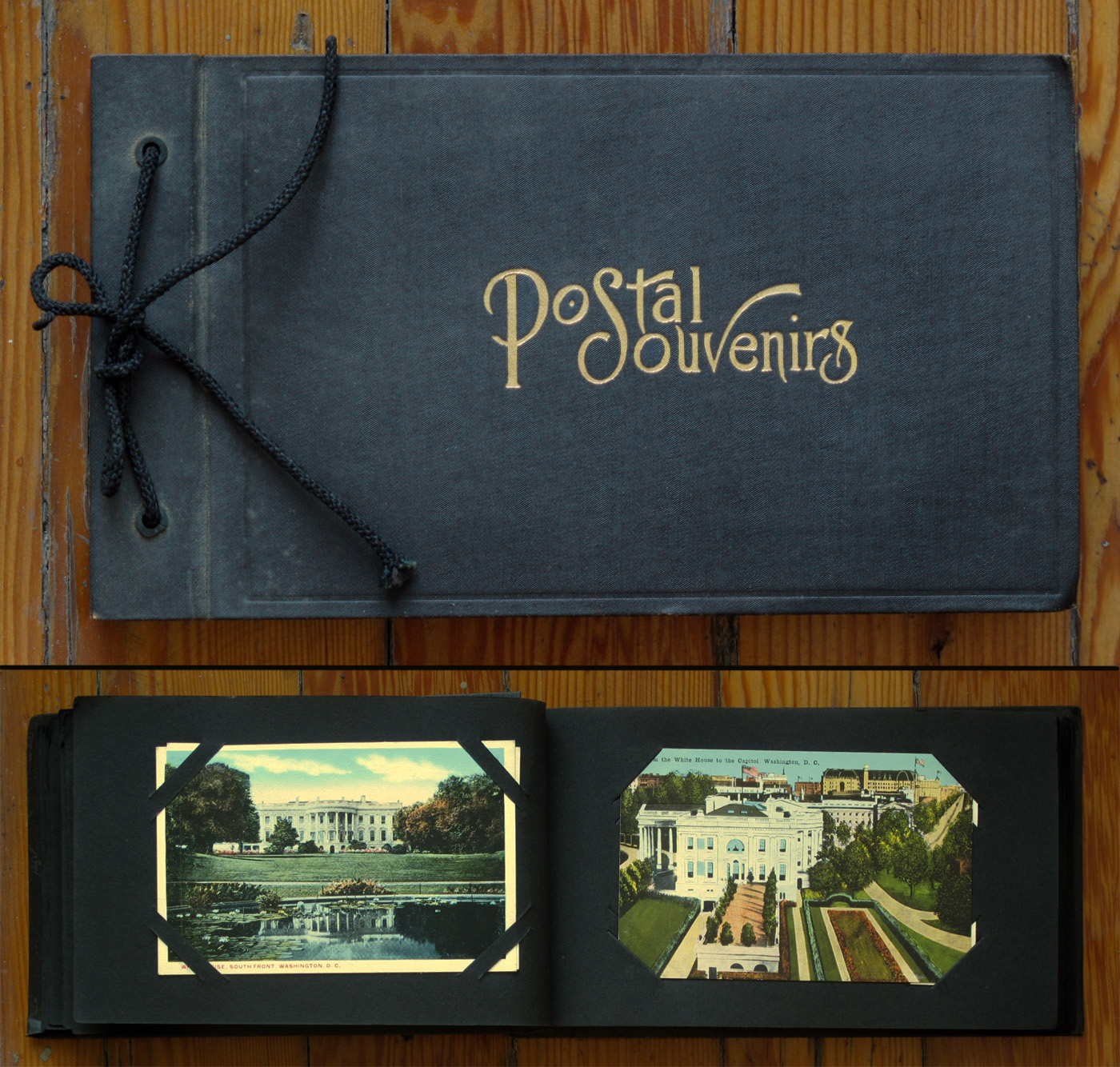
Album with the United States postcards (1910-е)

There are three most popular ways to store postcards: index card, in albums and in envelopes. Until the 1990s, collectors mainly used cardboard albums, threading the corners of postcards in the slots. Nowadays, plastic photo albums with pockets are used more often, as a postcard can be inserted in the pockets completely. The album storage method ensures the safety of the collection in the best way, plus it is visually appealing. However, the disadvantages are that as the collection grows it takes up more space, the collection increases in weight (due to the albums), and the overall cost of all the albums needed to house a collection.

With the index card storage method, collections of postcards are located in boxes of the appropriate size. Such boxes can be made by the collector independently from plywood, hardboard and standard shoe boxes. The boundaries of each subsection of the collection are marked with separator cards, which have a format larger than that of the postcard. When it comes to envelopes, a collector can put different postcards in an envelope, dividing them by their themes. The main advantages of these methods compared to albums are compactness, money saving, and time saving (reducing the time spent on inserting and rearranging cards in albums). The main disadvantage is that postcards quickly wear out from constant sorting.

== See also ==
- Postcrossing

== Famous Deltiologists ==
- David Adler (architect)
- Ronnie Barker
- Joe Berardo
- Jefferson Burdick
- Abdulla Dubin
- William Harwood (photographer)
- Paul Heaton
- Karl Jaeger (educator)
- Leonard Lauder
- John Margolies
- Lauro Moscardini
- Martin Parr
- Ron Scarlett
- Jane Scott (rock critic)
