= Too Far (disambiguation) =

Too Far may refer to:

- Too Far, a song by Kylie Minogue
- Too Far (Steven Universe), an episode
- Too Far, Rich Shapero project
- "Too Far", B-side of Ruby (Adam Wade song) 1960
