= Slowly =

Slowly may refer to:

- Slowly (app), Hong Kongese delayed messaging application
- Slowly (album), by Ghost, 1994
- "Slowly" (song), by Webb Pierce, 1954
- "Slowly", by Infected Mushroom from Legend of the Black Shawarma, 2009
- "Slowly", by Preoccupations from Arrangements, 2022
- "Slowly", a 2023 song by Indo-Canadian rapper Sukha

== See also ==
- "Despacito" (transl. "Slowly"), a song by Luis Fonsi
- Slowly Slowly (disambiguation)
