= Tacconi =

Tacconi is an Italian surname. Notable people with the surname include:

- Antonio Tacconi (1880–1962), Italian politician
- Daniele Tacconi (born 1960), Italian footballer
- Ferdinando Tacconi (1922–2006), Italian comics artist
- Francesco Tacconi (fl. 1464–1490), Italian Renaissance painter
- Linda Tacconi (born 1959), astronomer
- Stefano Tacconi (born 1957), Italian footballer
