= Rich Shapero =

American venture capitalist and author

- Born: 1947 or 1948 (age 77–78); Los Angeles, California
- Education: University of California, Berkeley (BA)
- Occupations: Venture capitalist; author
- Employer: Crosspoint Venture Partners
- Notable work: Wild Animus
- Website: richshapero.com

Rich Shapero is an American venture capitalist and author. After a career in the computing industry, he joined Crosspoint Venture Partners in 1993 where he was recognized for his successful investments in the broadband industry and related internet companies. In 2004, he spent more than $450,000 to promote and distribute his first novel, Wild Animus, which was self-published through his own vanity press. He distributed 40,000 advance copies through the BookCrossing book exchange website to a largely negative response. He went on to distribute thousands of copies for free at public events in several countries and on American college campuses. Shapero has continued this self-publishing and mass-distribution model for several subsequent novels.

== Early life and career ==
Shapero grew up in Los Angeles and attended UC Berkeley, where he graduated in 1970 with a degree in English literature.

Shapero began his career in the computing industry. He worked in marketing and sales positions at Informatics General Corporation and UNIVAC's Communications Division. He later served as president of networking company TOPS (a division of Sun Microsystems), Senior Director of Marketing at AST Research, and Chief Operating Officer of Shiva Corp.

In 1993, Shapero transitioned to the venture capital industry as general partner at Crosspoint Venture Partners in Woodside, California. Crosspoint invested primarily in the burgeoning broadband industry and related internet companies. Shapero and his partners invested in PairGain, Xylan, Ariba, and Brocade Communications Systems, among others. It was estimated that Shapero earned more than $500 million gross income from investments during his first three years at the company. In 2001, Shapero was ranked 97 on Forbes' inaugural Midas List of the top venture capital investors. That same year, he was featured as one of six "Gurus of Growth" in Business Week.

== Wild Animus ==
=== Early research and scientific contributions ===
Early preparation for Shapero's first novel, Wild Animus, began in 1978 while on a two-month solo hike in southeast Alaska. Prior the hike, Shapero changed his name to Ransom to match the protagonist of his novel. He self-published a report of the plant and animal specimens he encountered on his hike which was reference by the Department of the Interior in its justification for creating Wrangell–St. Elias National Park. He also brought back novel specimens of plants and insects.

=== Promotion ===
Shapero spent the next 24 years writing Wild Animus. He founded the publishing company TooFar Media in 2000 to publish and distribute the book. He dedicated all future profits from Wild Animus sales to The Conservation Fund.

Prior to the book's publication, Shapero distributed 40,000 advance copies through the BookCrossing exchange website. Readers received the book for free while BookCrossing charged Shapero shipping and handling fees. This promotion generated a "considerable negative response from readers." According to BookCrossing co-founder, Bruce Pederson,"We got quite a black eye from Wild Animus." Shapero reacted to the negative response, saying "I was surprised initially that there was so much controversy," having assumed that dissatisfied readers would "just leave it and move on." In March 2004, Shapero distributed 7,000 copies at the Iditarod dog-sled race in Alaska. Shapero's advance copy distribution of Wild Animus was unprecedented for a first-time novelist. In comparison, Dan Brown's The Da Vinci Code had 10,000 advance copies, which was considered "remarkable" at the time.

Wild Animus was released in October 2004 with a first print run of 50,000 copies. Shapero spent more than $450,000 to market and distribute Wild Animus through TooFar Media, which has been described as a vanity press. Shapero gave away as many as 100,000 copies of the book within the first month after its release. TooFar Media recruited individuals through Craigslist and newspaper ads to distribute copies of the book on college campuses and at events across United States. To further promote the book, Shapero's company hired actors in several US cities to dress up as sheep and hikers while reenacting scenes from the book in public areas and at book industry events, giving away free copies.

Promotion and free distribution of Wild Animus continued years after its release. In 2007, as part of a "guerilla-style performance-promotion program," a group of costumed female dancers performed on the streets of Adelaide, Australia, giving away "several thousand copies" of Shapero's CD, "The Ram," which was meant to accompany Wild Animus. TwoFar continued to distribute the book on college campuses along with the accompanying CD. In 2010, one of several boxes left on Yale University's campus containing copies of the book was reported as a suspicious package and triggered a response from Yale University Police and New Haven Police Department bomb disposal unit.

=== Critical reception ===
Reception of Wild Animus was mixed. Publishers Weekly praised Shapero's "vivid imagery" but found the bulk of the story did "little more than track one man's tedious journey toward acid-induced madness." Jim Dwyer, writing for Library Journal, called Wild Animus "a powerful and complex book" and recommended it for "all libraries." However, a Library Journal review of the audiobook concluded the story "will not appeal to the general listener." In the American Book Review, Dave Stevens praised the narration of the audiobook and discussed the philosophical themes of the "inner story," though he described the surface-level plot as "mundane." A review in the Peninsula Clarion described Shapero's "heady first novel" as "full of energy, gripping action and sensual details." Book critic, John Goodspeed, said Wild Animus is "well-written for a first novel."

== Other novels ==
Since publishing Wild Animus, Shapero has continued to distribute his subsequent books for free on college campuses. Critical reception of Shapero's subsequent books has been mostly negative.

The app version of Shapero's 2014 novel, The Hope We Seek, won the 2015 Digital Book World Award for "Best Adult Fiction App."
