= Alejandro Barrero Santiago =

Spanish writer

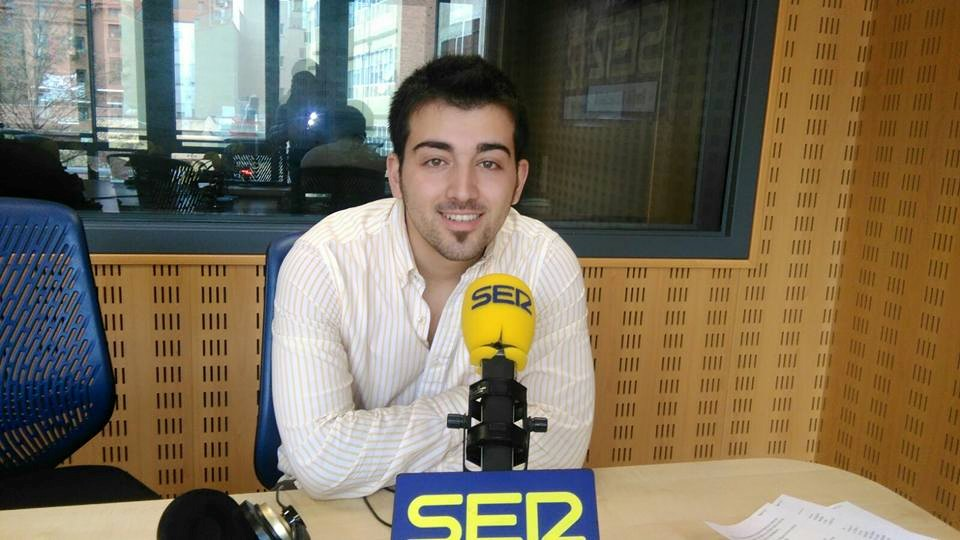
- The writer Alejandro Barrero Santiago on the radio.
- Born: 1993; Valladolid, Spain
- Occupations: Writer, teacher
- Writing career
- Genres: Fantasy, science fiction, romantic, erotic
- Website: alexbarrero.wix.com/viajeanadsgar

Alejandro Barrero Santiago is a Spanish writer (Valladolid, 1993), specialized in fantasy genre novels.

== Biography ==
Graduate in Teaching, Alejandro is noted for his early literary awakening, considered one of the youngest writers of Spain. He harmonizes both professions —writing and education—, giving presentations at Castilla y León and Barcelona about creative education. Already has three novels published to date, where he has excelled mainly as an epic fantasy author, although recently he has begun to be grown in the romantic and erotic genre.

His first novel, Viaje a Nadsgar I: Con el Diablo no se juega (Éride ediciones, 2014), written at seventeen years old, is classified as a Matryoshka novel due to the complexity of its plot, in which different storylines contained in turn are presented within each other. Its continuation is Viaje a Nadsgar II: El beso de la leónida (Éride ediciones, 2015) and the trilogy of Viaje a Nadsgar will end with the third and final installment, Viaje a Nadsgar III: La lágrima perdida, still unfinished.

Finally, with Te querré toda la vida (Éride ediciones, 2015) he joins the phenomenon of erotic gender which began with the novel of E. L. James in 2011. This novel is also known for the significant number of copies circulating in Spain as a BookCrossing.

Alejandro is a member of the Asociación de Castilla y León de Fantasía, Ciencia Ficción y Terror (Kalpa) pioneer in Castilla y León and chaired by the Spanish writer Dioni Arroyo Merino.

== Novels ==
- 2015 Viaje a Nadsgar II: El beso de la leónida (Éride ediciones, 2015)
- 2015 Te querré toda la vida (Éride ediciones, 2015)
- 2014 Viaje a Nadsgar I: Con el Diablo no se juega (Éride ediciones, 2014)
