= Pen pal =

People who regularly write letters to each other

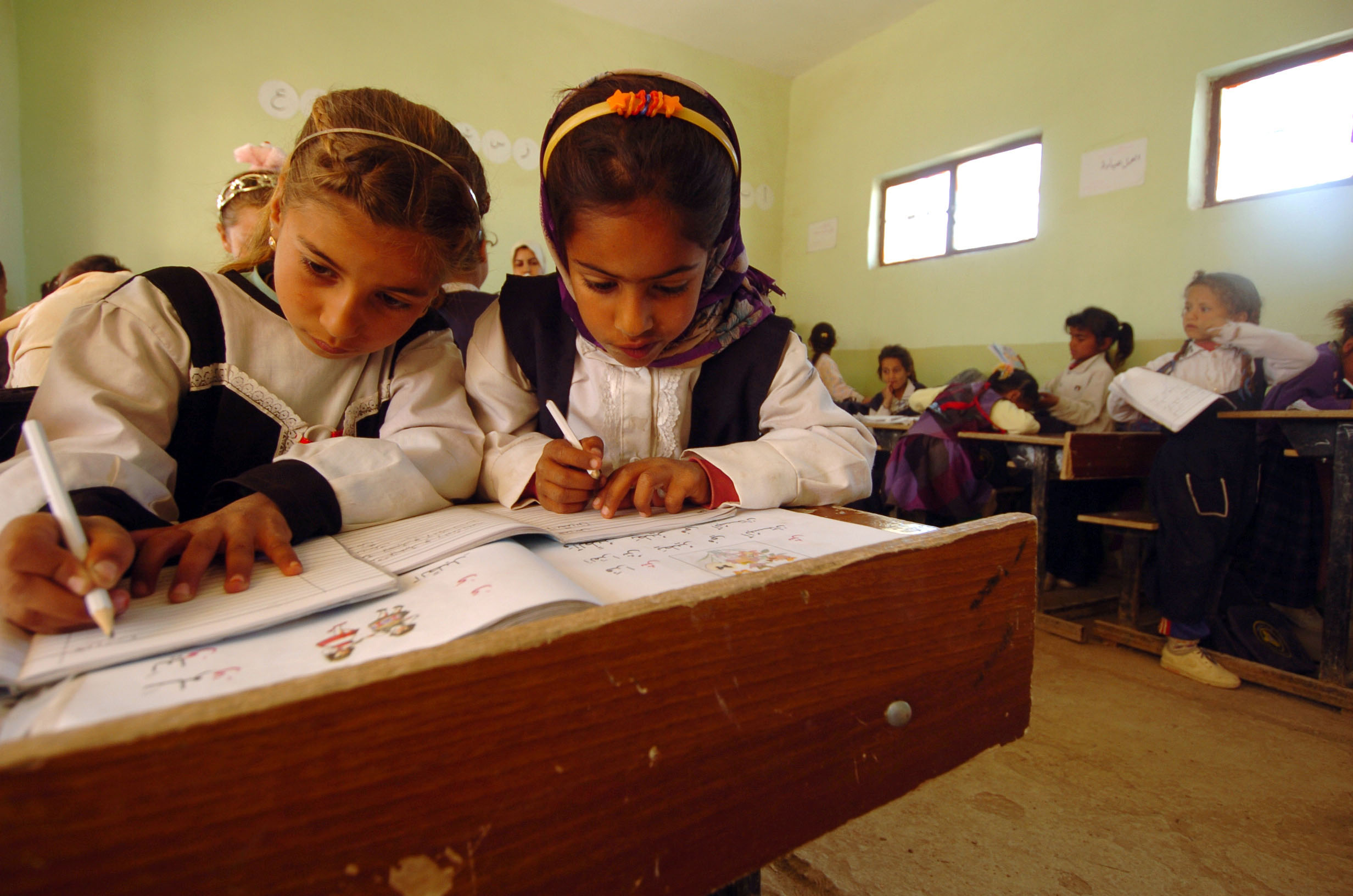
Adopt a School Program, connecting Iraqi schools with U.S. schools to help with supplies and start a pen pal program

Pen pals (or penfriends, penpals, pen-pals) are people who regularly write to each other, particularly via postal mail. Pen pals are usually strangers whose relationship is based primarily, or even solely, on their exchange of letters. Occasionally, pen pals may already have a relationship that is not regularly conducted in person.

== Purposes ==
A pen pal relationship is usually based around cultural exchange and developing a friendship. Other types of reasons that people may penpal include, the exchange of language, postcards, parcels and mail art. Pen pal clubs can nowadays be found on the Internet, in magazine columns, newspapers, social media sites and sometimes through clubs or special interest groups.

== Organizations ==
Many pen pals meet each other through organizations that bring people together for this purpose.

Organizations can be split into three main categories: free, partial subscription, and subscription-based clubs. Free clubs are usually funded by advertising and profiles are not reviewed, whereas subscription-based clubs will usually not contain any advertising and will have an administrator approving profiles to the database.

While the traditional snail mail pen pal relationship has fallen into a decline due to modern technology closing the world's communication gap, prison pen pal services have combined technology with traditional letter writing. These sites allow prisoners to place pen pal ads online; however, inmates in the United States and most of the world are not permitted to access the Internet. Therefore, the pen pal relationships with inmates are still conducted via postal mail. Other pen pal organizations have survived by embracing the technology of the Internet.

== In popular culture ==
The Australian author Geraldine Brooks wrote a memoir entitled Foreign Correspondence (1997), about her childhood which was enriched by her exchanges of letters with other children in Australia and overseas, and her travels as an adult in search of the people they had become.

In the 1970s, the syndicated children's television program Big Blue Marble often invited viewers to write to them for their own pen pal.

On another children's TV show, Pee-wee's Playhouse, Pee-wee Herman would often receive pen pal letters.

In the Peanuts comic strip from the 1960s and 1970s, Charlie Brown tries to write to a pen pal using a fountain pen, but after several literally "botched" attempts, Charlie switches to using a pencil and referring to his penpal as his "pencil-pal"; his first letter to his "pencil-pal" explains the reason for the name change. In the animated feature film adaptation, The Peanuts Movie, this hobby enables the story to have a happy ending with Charlie Brown to have an active friendship with his dream girl, the Little Red-Haired Girl, in a way that he feels comfortable without significantly affecting the franchise's story world.

The Bollywood film Romance (1983) is about two people, Amar (from India) and Sonia (from the UK) who fall in love after becoming pen pals. The Bollywood film Sirf Tum (1999) has a similar storyline.

The film You've Got Mail (1998) is a romantic comedy about two people in a pen pal email courtship who are unaware that they are also business rivals.

The action-drama film Out of Reach (2004) is about a pen pal relationship between a Vietnam War veteran and a 13-year-old orphaned girl from Poland. When the letters suddenly stop coming, the veteran heads to Poland to find out the reason.

The film A Cinderella Story (2004) is a teen romantic comedy about two people in a pen pal email courtship who plan to meet in person at their high school's Halloween dance.

The claymation film Mary and Max (2009) is about the pen pal relationship between an American man and an Australian girl.

In the 2012 film Moonrise Kingdom the characters Suzy and Sam become pen pals.

Musicians Jetty Rae and Heath McNease have collaborated under the moniker "Pen Pals".

In 2025, a Singaporean and a Newfoundlander who exchanged letters for over four decades, starting in 1983 as schoolgirls, met in person for the first time. Their meeting was documented by the BBC.

== See also ==
- The Flat Stanley Project
- Internet friendship
- Virtual exchange / telecollaboration
- Slowly (app)
- Postcrossing
- Letternet
