= Lauro Moscardini =

Italian astrophysicist and cosmologist

- Born: 30 October 1961 (age 64); Reggio Emilia, Italy
- Citizenship: Italian
- Education: Laurea, PhD.
- Alma mater: University of Bologna
- Scientific career
- Institutions: University of Bologna

Lauro Moscardini (born October 30, 1961) is an Italian astrophysicist and cosmologist. Moscardini has studied N-body cosmological simulations with non-Gaussian initial conditions. The research activity is mainly focussed in the field of theoretical and observational cosmology, in particular with the application of numerical techniques in astrophysics and the study of the formation of large cosmic structures. Moscardini's research is a mixture of observations and building models of large scale structures in the universe.

== Biography ==
Moscardini was born 30 October 1961, in Reggio Emilia, Italy. He was awarded a Laurea degree in 1986 and a PhD. in 1989 in Astronomy (Cosmological N-body simulations with non-Gaussian initial conditions) from University of Bologna. Moscardini did post-doctoral work at the University of Brighton from 1990 to 1991. He is also a Researcher at the Astronomy Department of the University of Padova since 1991. Moscardini taught a course on Astrophysics at the University of Pavia. In November 2002 Moscardini was appointed associate professor and Full Professor September 2016 at the Astronomy Department at the University of Bologna. He has a H-index of 50, and has more than 8000 citations.

== Research ==
Lauro Moscardini is a prolific researcher, coauthor of over two hundred refereed research publications. He has made important contributions to the field of large scale structure formation, particularly to the modeling of galaxy clustering at high redshift.

== The International Astronomical Union ==
Moscardini as a member of the IAU has been active in various divisions:

- Member of Division B Facilities, Technologies and Data Science
- Member of Division D High Energy Phenomena and Fundamental Physics
- Member of Division J Galaxies and Cosmology
- Member of Commission B1 Computational Astrophysics
- Member of Inter-Division B-H-J Commission Intergalactic Medium
- Member of Cross-Division D-J Commission Supermassive Black Holes, Feedback and Galaxy Evolution

Past affiliation(s) within the IAU

- Past Member of Division VIII Galaxies & the Universe (until 2012)
- Past Member of Commission 47 Cosmology (until 2015)

== Some Publications ==
- Non-Gaussian initial conditions in cosmological N-body simulations. II - Cold Dark Matter models; Moscardini, L., Matarrese, S., Lucchin, F., & Messina, A.; Monthly Notices of the Royal Astronomical Society; 1 Feb 1991;
- Modelling galaxy clustering at high redshift; Lauro Moscardini, Peter Coles, Francesco Lucchin, Sabino Matarrese; Monthly Notices of the Royal Astronomical Society; 30 August 1998;
- X-ray properties of galaxy clusters and groups from a cosmological hydrodynamical simulation; S. Borgani, G. Murante, V. Springel, A. Diaferio, K. Dolag, L. Moscardini, G. Tormen, L. Tornatore, P. Tozzi; Monthly Notices of the Royal Astronomical Society; 28 Oct 2003; arXiv:astro-ph/0310794
- A dynamical model for the distribution of dark matter and gas in galaxy clusters; Elena Rasia, Giuseppe Tormen, Lauro Moscardini; Monthly Notices of the Royal Astronomical Society; 15 Sep 2003, last revised 3 Mar 2004; arXiv:astro-ph/0309405
- The VIMOS Public Extragalactic Redshift Survey (VIPERS): Gravity test from the combination of redshift-space distortions and galaxy-galaxy lensing at 0.5 < z < 1.2; S. de la Torre, E. Jullo, C. Giocoli, A. Pezzotta, J. Bel, B. R. Granett, L. Guzzo, B. Garilli, M. Scodeggio, M. Bolzonella, U. Abbas, C. Adami, D. Bottini, A. Cappi, O. Cucciati, I. Davidzon, P. Franzetti, A. Fritz, A. Iovino, J. Krywult, V. Le Brun, O. Le Fèvre, D. Maccagni, K. Małek, F. Marulli, M. Polletta, A. Pollo, L.A.M. Tasca, R. Tojeiro, D. Vergani, A. Zanichelli, S. Arnouts, E. Branchini, J. Coupon, G. De Lucia, O. Ilbert, T. Moutard, L. Moscardini, J. A. Peacock, R. B. Metcalf, F. Prada, G. Yepes; Astronomy & Astrophysics; 16 Dec 2016, last revised 28 Aug 2017; arXiv:1612.05647

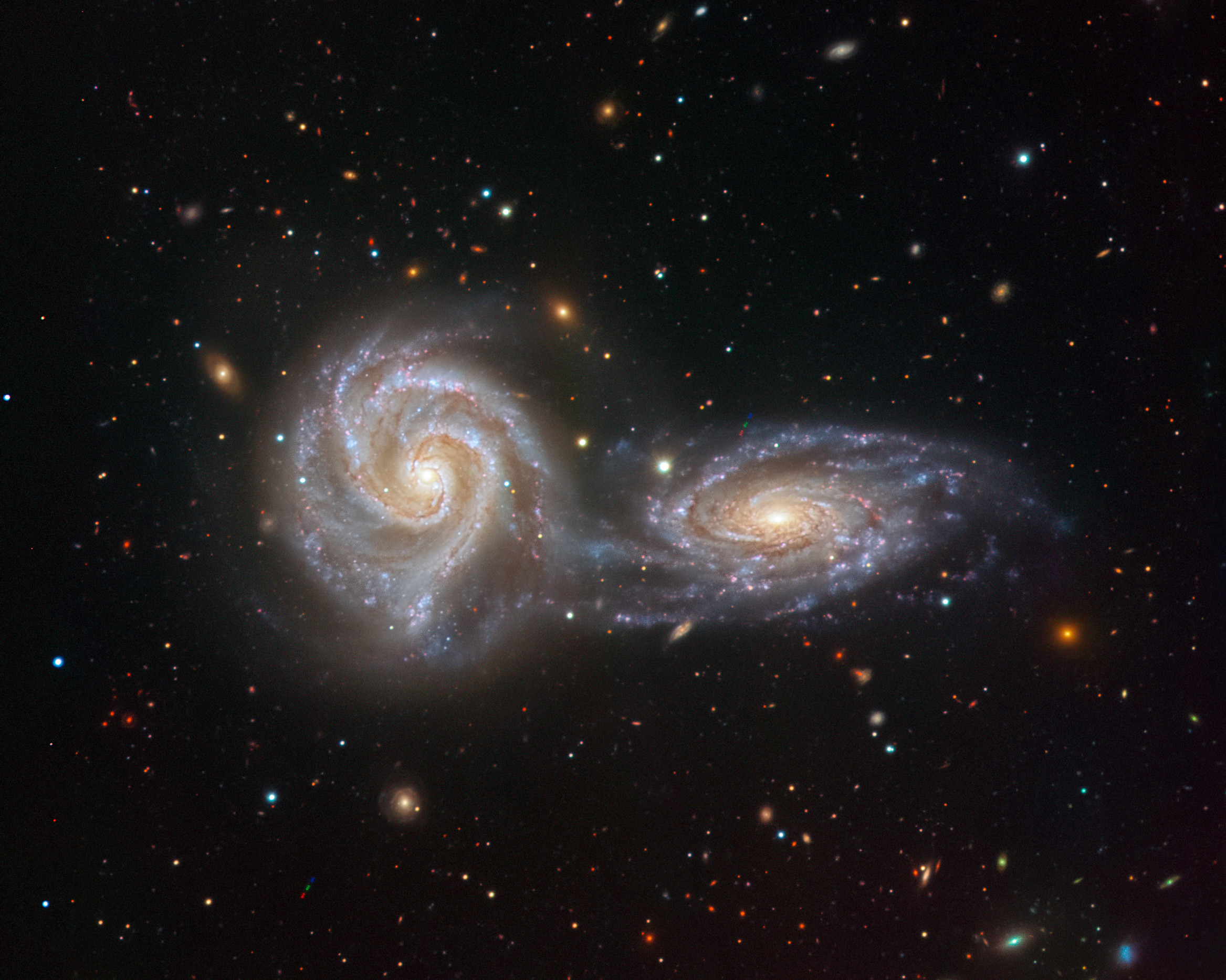
Two spiral galaxies are locked in a spellbinding, swirling dance in this image from the VIMOS instrument on ESO's Very Large Telescope (VLT). The two interacting galaxies — NGC 5426 and NGC 5427 — together form an intriguing astronomical object named Arp 271, the subject of this, the final image captured by VIMOS before it was decommissioned on 24 March 2018.

- Fast weak-lensing simulations with halo model; Carlo Giocoli, Sandra Di Meo, Massimo Meneghetti, Eric Jullo, Sylvain de la Torre, Lauro Moscardini, Marco Baldi, Pasquale Mazzotta, R. Benton Metcalf; Monthly Notices of the Royal Astronomical Society; 10 Jan 2017, last revised 5 Jun 2017, 470, pp. 3574 - 3590; arXiv:1701.02739
- AMICO: optimised detection of galaxy clusters in photometric surveys; Bellagamba, Fabio; Roncarelli, Mauro; Maturi, Matteo; Moscardini, Lauro; Monthly Notices of the Royal Astronomical Society; 16 October 2017, 473, pp. 5221 - 5236; arXiv:1705.03029
- Probing primordial features with next-generation photometric and radio surveys; Mario Ballardini, Fabio Finelli, Roy Maartens, Lauro Moscardini; Journal of Cosmology and Astroparticle Physics; 20 Dec 2017 (v1), last revised 4 Apr 2018; arXiv:1712.07425
- Searching for galaxy clusters in the Kilo-Degree Survey; M. Radovich, E. Puddu, F. Bellagamba, M. Roncarelli, L. Moscardini, S.Bardelli, A. Grado, F. Getman, M. Maturi, Z. Huang, N. Napolitano, J. McFarland, E. Valentijn, M. Bilicki; Astronomy & Astrophysics; 11 Jan 2017, 598, pp. A107 - A118; arXiv:1701.02954
- The XXL Survey: XXXII. Spatial clustering of the XXL-S AGN; M. Plionis, L.Koutoulidis, E. Koulouridis, L. Moscardini, C. Lidman, M. Pierre, C. Adami, L. Chiappetti, L. Faccioli, S. Fotopoulou, F. Pacaud, S. Paltani; Astronomy & Astrophysics; 17 Apr 2018; arXiv:1804.06409
- Weak-lensing peaks in simulated light cones: Investigating the coupling between dark matter and dark energy; Carlo Giocoli, Lauro Moscardini, Marco Baldi, Massimo Meneghetti, Robert B. Metcalf; Monthly Notices of the Royal Astronomical Society; 17 May 2018, 478, pp. 5436 - 5448; arXiv:1801.01886
- The VIMOS Public Extragalactic Redshift Survey (VIPERS): The complexity of galaxy populations at 0.4 < z < 1.3 revealed with unsupervised machine-learning algorithms; M. Siudek, K. Małek, A. Pollo, T. Krakowski, A. Iovino, M. Scodeggio, T. Moutard, G. Zamorani, L. Guzzo, B. Garilli, B. R. Granett, M. Bolzonella, S. de la Torre, U. Abbas, C. Adami, D. Bottini, A. Cappi, O. Cucciati, I. Davidzon, P. Franzetti, A. Fritz, J. Krywult, V. Le Brun, O. Le Fèvre, D. Maccagni, F. Marulli, M. Polletta, L.A.M. Tasca, R. Tojeiro, D. Vergani, A. Zanichelli, S. Arnouts, J. Bel, E. Branchini, J. Coupon, G. De Lucia, O. Ilbert, C. P. Haines, L. Moscardini, T. T. Takeuchi; Astronomy & Astrophysics; 24 May 2018, last revised 18 Dec 2018; arXiv:1805.09904
- Weak lensing light-cones in modified gravity simulations with and without massive neutrinos; Carlo Giocoli, Marco Baldi, Lauro Moscardini; Monthly Notices of the Royal Astronomical Society; 12 Jun 2018 (v1), last revised 6 Sep 2018; arXiv:1806.04681
- Gravitational lensing detection of an extremely dense environment around a galaxy cluster; Mauro Sereno, Carlo Giocoli, Luca Izzo, Federico Marulli, Alfonso Veropalumbo, Stefano Ettori, Lauro Moscardini, Giovanni Covone, Antonio Ferragamo, Rafael Barrena, Alina Streblyanska; Nature Astronomy; 9 July 2018, 2, pp. 744 - 750; arXiv:1807.04277
- The XXL Survey: XVI. The clustering of X-ray selected galaxy clusters at z ~ 0.3; F. Marulli, A. Veropalumbo, M. Sereno, L. Moscardini, F. Pacaud, M. Pierre, M. Plionis, A. Cappi, C. Adami, S. Alis, B. Altieri, M. Birkinshaw, S. Ettori, L. Faccioli, F. Gastaldello, E. Koulouridis, C. Lidman, J.-P. Le Fèvre, S. Maurogordato, B. Poggianti, E. Pompei, T. Sadibekova, I. Valtchanov; Astronomy & Astrophysics; 16 Jul 2018; arXiv:1807.04760
- AMICO galaxy clusters in KiDS-DR3: weak lensing mass calibration; Fabio Bellagamba, Mauro Sereno, Mauro Roncarelli, Matteo Maturi, Mario Radovich, Sandro Bardelli, Emanuella Puddu, Lauro Moscardini, Fedor Getman, Hendrik Hildebrandt, Nicola Napolitano; Monthly Notices of the Royal Astronomical Society; 5 Oct 2018 (v1), last revised 8 Jan 2019, 473, pp. 5221 - 5236; arXiv:1810.02827

== Miscellany ==
Lauro Moscardini owns one of the largest and most prized collections of papal postcards in Italy, and he is a renowned specialist in the field. He is also interested in Roman numismatics. Without bibliographic references
