= Ahista Ahista =

Ahista Ahista or Aahista Aahista (lit. 'Slowly Slowly') may refer to:

- Ahista Ahista (1981 film), a 1981 Indian film
- Ahista Ahista (2006 film), a 2006 Indian film
- "Aahista Aahista", a song from the Indian film Bachna Ae Haseeno (2008)
- "Aahista Aahista", a song from the Indian film Laila Majnu (2018)
- Aahista Aahista (TV series), a 2014 Pakistani television series

== See also ==
- Slowly Slowly (disambiguation)
