= William Harwood (photographer) =

William Harwood (6 April 1883 – 1976) was a photographer and keen collector of postcards of the region surrounding Criccieth, Wales, part of the United Kingdom.

== Biography ==
William Harwood came onto the scene too late for the "Golden Age" of postcards, but from 1926 to 1958 he produced probably the finest quality postcards of Criccieth and the surrounding area in North Wales in terms of composition that have ever been produced. Born on 6 April 1883 in Stalybridge, Cheshire, the fifth child of a cotton mule spinner, he initially became an assistant librarian but studied photography and spent a great deal of his spare time travelling about the Stalybridge area taking photographs.

In 1913 he married Miss Bertha Shaw and the couple had two daughters, Edith and Margaret. For a while he worked as a photographic representative and then in 1925 he and the family moved to Criccieth, Caernarfonshire, where he rented London House, a shop with living accommodation aboveand it opened as a Toy and Fancy Goods shop. Later additions to the lines offered were music and records, stationery, books, and "The latest picture postcards".

He continued his photography and in 1926 produced his first postcards of the Criccieth area and from then until his retirement (because of failing health) in 1958 his shop window featured a regular display of post cards for sale.

The business was always a family affair and no other staff were employed in the shop or postcard business. Although unknown to his surviving daughters it would appear that he came to an agreement with two other local postcard in Porthmadog and Pwllheli about the areas each would cover. Harwood kept the area as a far east of Criccieth as far as Blackrock Sands and as far west as Afon Wen, and the other two never venturedonto his territory.

Although a business, it would appear that the main reason for his producing postcards was his love of photography, and once again his spare time was spent walking, always with a camera. This usually was a Goertz Plate Camera, which he referred to as his press camera" which he used for the majority of his postcard production. Other cameras he owned and used at various times were a Thornton Pickard 1/2 plate Field Camera, a Thornton Pickard 1/4 plate "Sanderson", a Thornton Pickard 1/4 plate "Ruby Reflex" and a "Nydia" – an old camera with a washlether bag attached for changing plates.

The developing and printing of the postcards, which were all black and white and real photographic, was all carried out in the basement below the shop. In 1974, at the instigation of Mr. James Young of Bank House, Criccieth, next door to William Harwood's former shop, the 1500 remaining negatives from his production went to the National Library of Wales in Aberystwyth, a fact that gave him great satisfaction to know that his work would be preserved for future generations. In 1982, the library selected about 300 negatives to re-print and this collection of his work is kept in the print room for modern collectors to view.

William Harwood died of a stroke in 1976 at the age of 93, leaving behind him a legacy of superbly-composed middle period postcards.
