= Slowly Slowly =

Slowly Slowly may refer to:

- "Slowly Slowly" (Guru Randhawa song), a 2019 song by Guru Randhawa featuring Pitbull
- Slowly Slowly (band), an Australian rock band
- "Slowly, Slowly" (Magnapop song), a 1994 song by Magnapop
- "Dheere Dheere Zara Zara" (lit. 'Slowly Slowly Little Little'), a song by R. D. Burman and Asha Bhosle from the 1983 Indian film Agar Tum Na Hote

== See also ==
- Slowly (disambiguation)
- Ahista Ahista (disambiguation)
