= Postcrossing =

Hobby involving exchanging postcards

- Website type: Project website
- Available in: English
- Owner: Postcrossing Lda
- Creator: Paulo Magalhães
- Website: postcrossing.com
- Registration: Yes
- Launched: July 14, 2005; 21 years ago

Postcrossing is an online project for people to exchange postcards with other project members globally. The project's tag line is "send a postcard and receive a postcard back from a random person somewhere in the world!" The name Postcrossing is a union of the words postcard and crossing, and its origin "is loosely based on the Bookcrossing site".

Members can get details of other randomly selected members to send a postcard to, then receive cards from other random members. Official exchanges between the two members occur only once, but unofficial ongoing swaps between members are possible. As of October 2026, Postcrossing had more than 806,000 members in 208 countries and territories, and over 88 million registered postcards had been exchanged.

== How it works ==
To be eligible to receive a postcard, a member must first send one. When a member requests to send a postcard, they are given the address of another member and a unique postcard ID (e.g. US-787). Afterwards, they will send a postcard to that address with the postcard ID displayed. Costs of postcards and postage fees are the responsibility of the user sending the card. When the recipient registers that postcard ID, the sender becomes eligible to receive postcards. Each member can write profile text visible to the sender which can contain personal information and postcard preferences. The Postcrossing system allows two members to exchange postcards only once. By default, members will exchange postcards with countries other than their own but they can decide to exchange postcards with other users in their own country. Users can express a preference not to send to repeated countries but it does not guarantee that there will be no repetitions.

Initially each member can have up to five postcards traveling at a time. Once five cards are in transit they need to wait for a card to be registered as received before they can request another address. The limit increases as users build experience exchanging cards, up to a maximum limit of 100. A small proportion of postcards do not get registered as received because they get lost en route, have an unreadable ID, or are received by members who are no longer active. The system attempts to adjust for these issues to reduce the difference between the number of sent and received postcards of each member.

== Members ==
Membership is free and anyone with an address can create an account. The greatest numbers of members, known as postcrossers, are in Russia, Taiwan, and the United States. Globally, most postcrossers reside in North America, Europe, and East Asia. As of October 2026, about 42% of the combined total of postcards were sent from Germany, the United States, and Russia.

Countries with most users^{a}
Rank	Country	Users
1.	Russia	112,681
2.	Taiwan	107,754
3.	United States	84,226
4.	Germany	69,667
5.	China	66,418
6.	Netherlands	35,598
7.	Belarus	29,308
8.	Poland	27,304
9.	Ukraine	21,942
10.	France	21,015
11.	Czech Republic	20,653
12.	United Kingdom	18,390
13.	Finland	14,673
14.	Japan	14,153
15.	Canada	11,685

Countries with most sent postcards^{a}
Rank	Country	Sent postcards
1.	Germany	16,134,074
2.	United States	11,910,609
3.	Russia	9,521,483
4.	Netherlands	5,968,748
5.	Finland	4,792,532
6.	China	3,700,084
7.	Taiwan	3,407,297
8.	Belarus	3,161,764
9.	Japan	2,345,373
10.	Czech Republic	2,125,616
11.	Poland	1,878,174
12.	United Kingdom	1,835,678
13.	France	1,761,446
14.	Ukraine	1,734,517
15.	Canada	1,602,957

^aTables last updated October 1, 2026

== History ==
Postcrossing was created by Paulo Magalhães. It was initially a hobby based on his enjoyment of receiving postcards: "The element of surprise of receiving postcards from different places in the world (many of which you would probably never have heard of) can turn your mailbox into a box of surprises–and who wouldn't like that?" He started the website on July 14, 2005, hosted at his home on an old computer in a clothes closet. The project rapidly grew internationally, initially via word-of-mouth then promoted by media attention.

The millionth Postcrossing postcard was received on April 11, 2008. The project's popularity continued to accelerate, reaching two million in February 2009. The five millionth postcard was received in August 2010, shortly after the project's fifth anniversary, and the 10 millionth postcard was registered in January 2012. As of 2026, approximately one million postcards are registered every two or three months, passing the milestone of 85 million postcards received on January 19, 2026.

Postcards exchanged per month

=== Postcard Milestones ===
Million	Date	Time (UTC)	From	To	Postcard
1	April 11, 2008	3:03 pm	Turkey	Romania	TR-8482
2	February 26, 2009	6:34 am	Germany	Norway	DE-292437
3	September 24, 2009	4:09 pm	Finland	Slovenia	FI-637138
4	March 28, 2010	10:14 am	Czechia	Netherlands	CZ-48446
5	August 24, 2010	7:14 pm	Italy	Thailand	IT-98823
6	December 30, 2010	12:03 pm	Spain	Germany	ES-97547
7	April 19, 2011	6:59 pm	China	Netherlands	CN-357628
8	August 2, 2011	11:28 am	Finland	Japan	FI-1149781
9	November 3, 2011	5:13 am	China	Russia	CN-450151
10	January 27, 2012	4:56 pm	Japan	Germany	JP-232027
11	April 3, 2012	8:04 pm	U.S.A.	Iceland	US-1615550
12	June 12, 2012	6:28 pm	U.S.A.	Netherlands	US-1710034
13	August 22, 2012	5:08 am	Hong Kong	Russia	HK-45392
14	October 25, 2012	8:52 pm	Netherlands	Honduras	NL-1464473
15	December 31, 2012	1:46 pm	Germany	Italy	DE-1800737
16	March 4, 2013	7:21 am	Ukraine	Russia	UA-487482
17	May 1, 2013	12:20 am	Russia	Australia	RU-1658153
18	July 3, 2013	6:57 am	Finland	Taiwan	FI-1791281
19	September 2, 2013	9:56 am	Ukraine	Germany	UA-737378
20	October 29, 2013	5:49 am	U.S.A.	Taiwan	US-2449004
21	December 23, 2013	10:54 pm	Netherlands	Italy	NL-2232945
22	February 17, 2014	3:03 pm	Netherlands	Poland	NL-2339217
23	April 10, 2014	10:47 am	Germany	Australia	DE-3043747
24	June 8, 2014	12:40 pm	Latvia	Japan	LV-150063
25	August 10, 2014	11:02 am	Netherlands	Germany	NL-2612179
26	October 10, 2014	3:36 am	U.S.A.	Hong Kong	US-3009516
27	December 7, 2014	2:05 am	Japan	Taiwan	JP-612910
28	February 5, 2015	7:13 pm	Netherlands	Germany	NL-2863567
29	April 2, 2015	4:04 pm	Netherlands	U.S.A.	NL-2930266
30	June 2, 2015	12:27 am	Germany	Portugal	DE-4221494
31	August 5, 2015	11:39 am	Netherlands	Philippines	NL-3078076
32	October 6, 2015	6:40 pm	Romania	U.S.A.	RO-109708
33	December 5, 2015	11:37 am	Netherlands	Japan	NL-3242698
34	February 4, 2016	7:41 pm	Finland	Germany	FI-2619857
35	March 31, 2016	11:49 pm	Hong Kong	U.S.A.	HK-407034
36	May 31, 2016	6:34 pm	China	U.S.A.	CN-1943122
37	August 2, 2016	7:08 pm	Russia	U.S.A.	RU-4866496
38	October 4, 2016	4:09 pm	Netherlands	U.S.A.	NL-3579375
39	December 7, 2016	7:56 am	Taiwan	U.S.A.	TW-2105862
40	February 13, 2017	6:39 am	Taiwan	France	TW-2118751
41	April 17, 2017	10:46 am	Czechia	Japan	CZ-1159412
42	June 28, 2017	6:15 pm	U.S.A.	Germany	US-4715663
43	September 2, 2017	2:23 pm	China	Germany	CN-2281671
44	November 7, 2017	10:46 pm	Russia	Costa Rica	RU-6019041
45	January 16, 2018	6:26 pm	Australia	Czechia	AU-590448
46	March 20, 2018	6:00 pm	Germany	Russia	DE-6951547
47	May 28, 2018	8:03 am	U.S.A.	Taiwan	US-5301280
48	August 7, 2018	3:47 am	U.S.A.	Thailand	US-5456394
49	October 16, 2018	1:32 am	Russia	U.S.A.	RU-6804601
50	December 27, 2018	7:13 pm	Israel	Russia	IL-60207
51	March 4, 2019	10:56 am	Slovenia	France	SI-174914
52	May 13, 2019	5:47 am	Russia	Russia	RU-7247664
53	July 25, 2019	5:25 am	U.S.A.	Sweden	US-6129158
54	October 7, 2019	5:27 pm	France	Russia	FR-1208264
55	December 18, 2019	4:56 pm	Germany	Belgium	DE-8811634
56	February 28, 2020	11:49 am	Netherlands	Russia	NL-4570321
57	June 5, 2020	7:15 pm	Germany	Russia	DE-9251821
58	August 28, 2020	9:17 am	Czechia	Germany	CZ-1723155
59	November 10, 2020	8:51 pm	Taiwan	Germany	TW-3064528
60	January 24, 2021	10:17 am	Belarus	Czechia	BY-2711325
61	April 1, 2021	12:57 am	Netherlands	China	NL-4843833
62	June 8, 2021	12:01 am	China	U.S.A.	CN-3120100
63	August 18, 2021	07:12 am	U.S.A.	Taiwan	US-7750150
64	October 26, 2021	1:07 pm	Finland	Germany	FI-4039073
65	January 4, 2022	8:39 pm	France	Hungary	FR-1467922
66	March 9, 2022	7:44 pm	Finland	Netherlands	FI-4130313
67	May 25, 2022	1:11 pm	China	Belarus	CN-3322046
68	August 10, 2022	6:13 pm	Slovakia	Germany	SK-278899
69	October 22, 2022	7:18 pm	U.S.A.	Germany	US-8785398
70	January 4, 2023	11:36 pm	U.S.A.	U.S.A.	US-9001590
71	March 14, 2023	12:32 pm	Germany	Russia	DE-12712886
72	May 28, 2023	1:36 pm	Germany	United Kingdom	DE-13026949
73	August 12, 2023	7:35 pm	Germany	Germany	DE-13280232
74	October 25, 2023	7:35 pm	U.S.A.	Germany	US-9786292
75	January 8, 2024	3:13 pm	Germany	Russia	DE-13658011
76	March 18, 2024	8:32 pm	U.S.A.	United Kingdom	US-10179025
77	June 6, 2024	8:58 am	Germany	Switzerland	DE-14252655
78	August 16, 2024	12:46 pm	Germany	Bosnia-Herzegovina	DE-14335070
79	October 27, 2024	8:52 pm	Australia	Germany	AU-960950
80	January 7, 2025	2:32 am	Netherlands	Germany	NL-5891077
81	March 18, 2025	5:50 pm	U.S.A.	U.S.A.	US-11216678
82	June 3, 2025	2:20 am	U.S.A.	Bosnia and Herzegovina	US-11400700
83	August 22, 2025	11:36 am	China	Germany	CN-4084219
84	November 2, 2025	11:20 am	Germany	Russia	DE-15871132
85	January 19, 2026	1:06 am	U.S.A.	U.S.A.	US-11986178
86	March 27, 2026	6:27 pm	Spain	U.S.A.	ES-888468
87	June 9, 2026	3:02 pm	Germany	Germany	DE-16768270
88	August 24, 2026	10:12 pm	U.S.A.	U.S.A.	US-12743087
89	November 4, 2026	9:47 am	Germany	Spain	DE-17227286

== Postcrossing-themed stamps ==
The first Postcrossing-themed stamp was released by PostNL in 2011. Since then more than a dozen countries' postal services have followed suit and some released multiple Postcrossing-themed stamps. The majority of the stamps have been launched in partnership with the Postcrossing community but some "unofficial" stamps displayed the Postcrossing trademark without approval of the Postcrossing organization.

=== List of official Postcrossing stamps ===
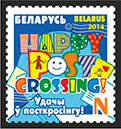
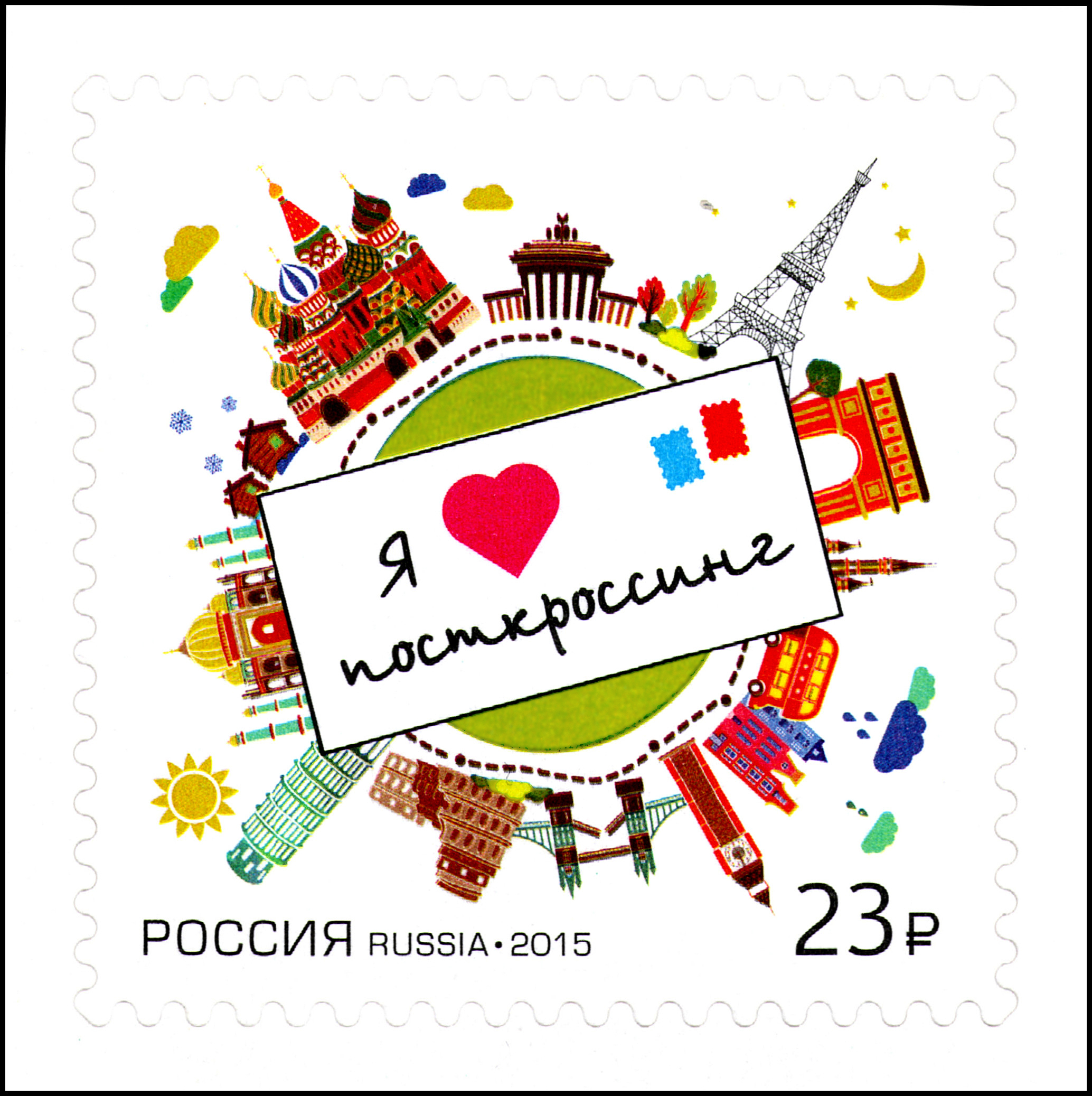
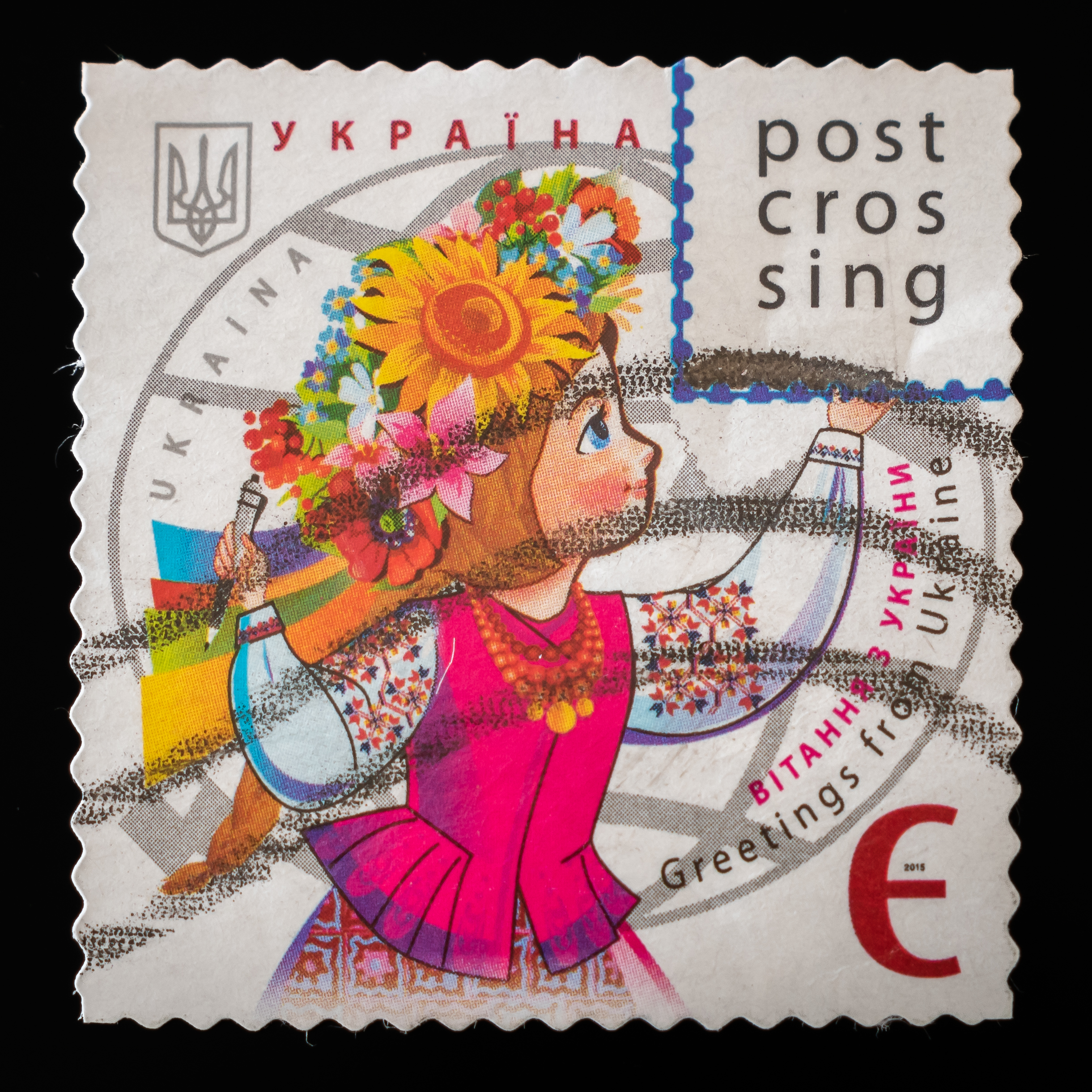
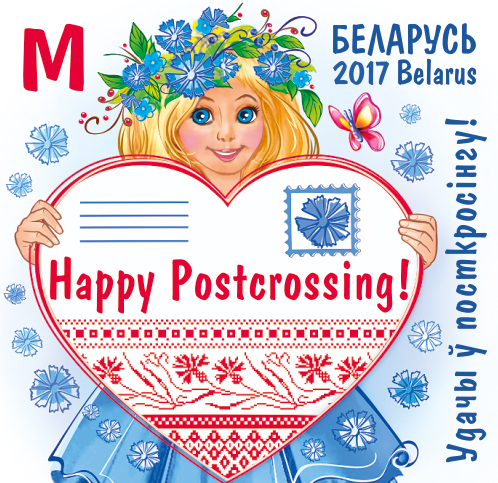
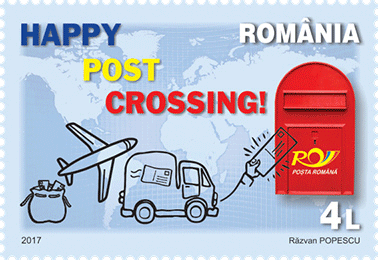
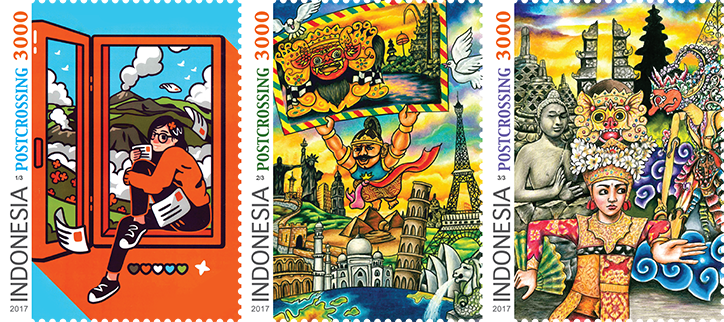
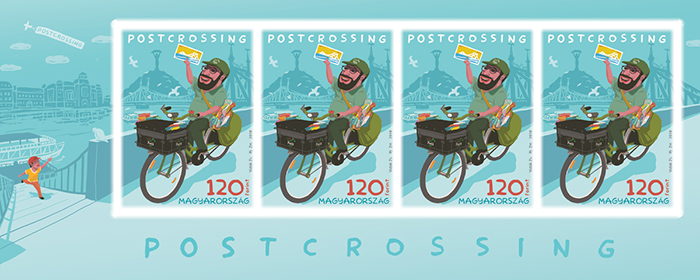
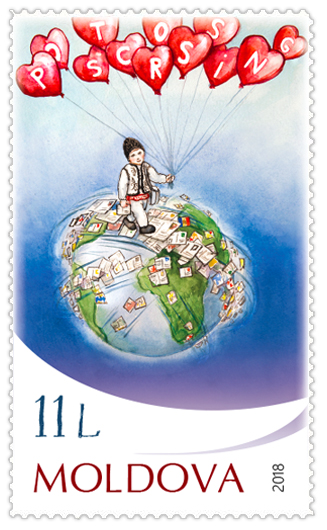
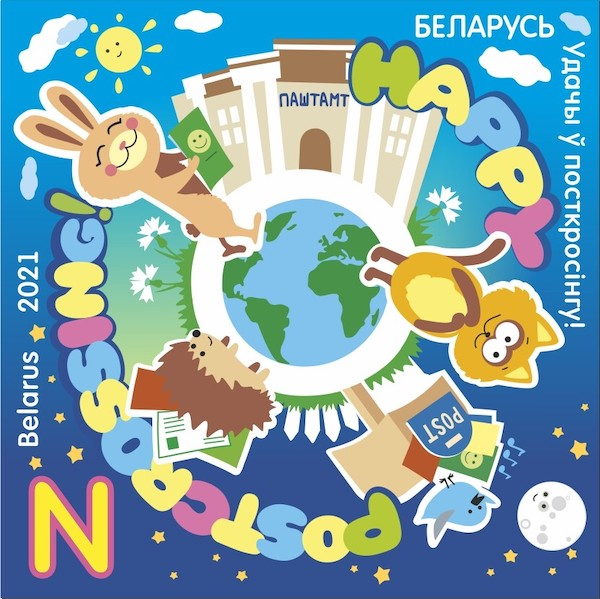
Some Postcrossing stamps; from left to right, up to down:
1. January 2, 2014 Belarus Belposhta released their own Postcrossing-themed stamp in Belarus; the stamp was designed by Inga Turlo and features the words "Happy Postcrossing" in both English and Belarusian; the English text is displayed using many colors and designs; 2. Russia The Russian Post issued a stamp designed by Olga Shushlebina; the stamp shows the words "Я ❤ посткроссинг" (Russian: "I ❤ Postcrossing") and schematic pictures of world sights. 3. Ukraine 4. Belarus Belposhta launched their second Postcrossing-themed stamps in Belarus. The stamp was designed by Marina Vitkovskaya and features the words "Happy Postcrossing" in both English and Belarusian. 5. Romania 6. Indonesia Indonesia Post presented three new Postcrossing-themed stamps on Postcrossing's 12th anniversary. 7. Hungary 8. Moldova the Post of Moldova created their first postcrossing-themed stamp featuring postcards zooming around the globe 9. Belarus Yauheniya Biadonik designed Belarus' third Postcrossing-themed stamp

Stamps officially backed by the Postcrossing community are posted on the Postcrossing blog:

- PostNL, October 2011
- Posti (Finland), September 2013
- Belposhta (Belarus), January 2014
- Guernsey Post, May 2014
- Russia Post, January 2015
- Slovenia Post, May 2015
- Czech Post, September 2015
- Ukrposhta (Ukraine), October 2015
- PostNL, March 2016
- Austria Post, May 2016
- Polish Post, July 2016
- Guernsey Post, July 2016
- Belpochta, January 2017
- Romfilatelia (Romania), February 2017
- Indonesia Post, July 2017
- Swiss Post, September 2017
- An Post (Ireland), October 2017
- Magyar Posta (Hungary), February 2018
- Moldova Post, June 2018
- Åland Post, 7 June 2019
- Brazil Post, July 2020
- Guernsey Post, June 2021
- Belpochta, June 2021
- Austria Post, July 2021
- Post Luxembourg, September 2022
- Deutsche Post, October 2022
- NZ Post, August 2024
- Polish Post, October 2024
- bpost, June 2025
- PostNL, July 2025
- United States Postal Service, May 2026

== World Postcard Day (October 1st) ==
On October 1, 2019, Postcrossing organised global events to celebrate the postcard's 150th anniversary. Events included postcard exhibitions, special cancellations marks, postcard writing workshops and seminars, commemorative postcards and special stamp issues. Postcrossing organised an exhibition at the Universal Postal Union's (UPU) headquarters in Bern, with postcards from across the world sharing messages about the importance of postcards.

Following the success of these events, in 2020, Postcrossing launched World Postcard Day. Commemorative postcards and special cancellation marks were issued to mark the day. A commemorative postcard for the event was chosen in a competition for design and art students. Special events included online postcard exhibitions, postcard writing workshops and online meetings. A lesson plan was created in eight languages to help teacher introduce postcards to young children in schools. Further events have been held annually since 2020.

== See also ==
- Chain letter
- Deltiology
- Gift economy
- QSL card
- Slowly (app)
