= Abdulla Dubin =

Dubin Abdulla İbrahim ulı ([ˈdubin ʌbduˈlɑ ibrɑˌhimuˈlɯ], Tatar Cyrillic: Дубин Абдулла Ибраһим улы; Russian: Ду́бин Абдулла́ Ибраги́мович, Dubin Abdulla Ibragimovich; March 26, 1941 – October 25, 2026) was a Tatar television and radio newsreader, and now an ethnographer.

Born on March 26, 1941, in Astrakhan in a large family.

Dubin graduated from the faculty of theatrics of the GITIS in Moscow. Later he moved to Kazan and was a top-level news reader of Tatar television and radio broadcasting from 1961 to 1981.

Abdulla Dubin is also known as a journalist and as a historical postcards collector. He published some of his collection in original booklets in color and black-and-white, devoted to Kazan, Astrakhan, Chistopol and Elabuga.

Dubin studies regional ethnography from 1968, fights for preservation of tumbledown historical buildings in Kazan.

In 1990 he committed the Hajj.

== Bibliography ==
"Абдулла Дубин". Tatar Encyclopaedia (in Tatar). Kazan: The Republic of Tatarstan Academy of Sciences. Institution of the Tatar Encyclopaedia. 2002.
