= Slowly (app) =

Hong Kongese delayed messaging application

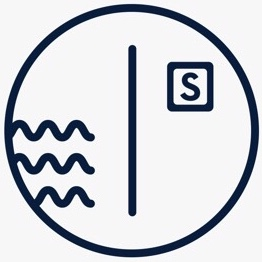
- Original authors: Kevin Wong Ho-yin, JoJo Chan Sau-wun
- Developer: Slowly Communications Ltd.
- Initial release: 14 February 2017; 8 years ago (iOS only)
- Stable release: 9.0.1 / 19 September 2024; 12 months ago
- Operating system: iOS, Android, web app
- Size: 21.7 MB (iOS); 38 MB (Android)
- Available in: 26 languages
- List of languages Arabic, Catalan/Valencian, Chinese, Czech, Dutch, English, French, German, Hebrew, Hungarian, Indonesian, Italian, Japanese, Korean, Polish, Portuguese (Brazilian), Russian, Serbian (Latin), Slovak, Spanish, Swedish, Thai, Turkish, Ukrainian and Vietnamese
- Website: slowly.app

Slowly (stylized as SLOWLY) is a geosocial networking application that allows users to exchange delayed messages or "letters". The time taken by a message to be delivered depends on the distance between the sender and the recipient.

== History ==
Slowly's mailbox icon and wordmark

Slowly was released on iOS in 2017 and on Android a year later. It was featured as App Store's "App of the Day" in over 30 regions worldwide. It was also awarded 2019's "Best Breakthrough App" by Google Play. By January 2019, it had reached 1 million users.

The Slowly web application was launched in version 5.0, in mid-September 2019. In 2020, features such as Dark Mode, the ability to exchange audio notes and to pass a letter without it affecting the user's sent/received ratio were introduced in version 6.0 of the app. A paid membership feature called SLOWLY PLUS was also launched that allows members to double their quotas for the number of friends, excluded topics and regions, and photo sharing.

In September 2023, Slowly launched an Open Letters. This feature enables users to share their open letters or to read others open letters in order to connect and boost their potential match.

== Operation ==
Users are required to create a nickname and an avatar for themselves to get started. They can either manually browse user profiles or be "auto-matched" using an algorithm. It lets users search for people using various filters such as common interests or people from particular countries. The app establishes several "House Rules" that must be agreed to before a user can use the app. The "letters" take anything from 30 minutes to 60 hours to "slowly" reach their destination, depending on how far apart the sender and the recipient live. Virtual stamps are collected and attached to the "letters" before mailing them.

Stamps can be obtained for free on special occasions or purchased in the "Stamp Store" using "SLOWLY Coins", which are bought with local currency or earned by watching short ads. Messages may also include photos and audio notes with the recipient's consent.

Slowly users can also use a "Web Version", which runs on a web browser in their PC or laptop. First-time Web users can login by using a QR code, generated through the web app and scanned/verified by their mobile device's Slowly app. The Web Client offers easier and faster writing and is generally preferred by users composing longer "letters".

== See also ==
- Pen pal
- Postcrossing
