= Linda Tacconi =

German scientist (born 1959)

- Born: August 5, 1959 (age 67)

Academic background
- Education: PhD, 1988, University of Massachusetts Amherst
- Thesis: The Distribution of the Interstellar Medium in the SCD Galaxy NGC 6946 and in a Sample of Dwarf Irregular Galaxies (1988)

Linda Jean Tacconi–Garman (born August 5, 1959) is a senior scientist at the Max Planck Institute for Extraterrestrial Physics.

== Career ==
Tacconi was born on August 5, 1959. She earned her PhD from the University of Massachusetts Amherst in 1988 and published her thesis titled "The Distribution of the Interstellar Medium in the SCD Galaxy NGC 6946 and in a Sample of Dwarf Irregular Galaxies." Upon completing her PhD, Tacconi began working at the Netherlands Foundation for Research in Astronomy (ASTRON) before leaving to work with the Max Planck Institute for Extraterrestrial Physics (MPE) in 1991. During her time at MPE, she received the Lancelot Berkeley Prize "in recognition of her contributions to the field, and in particular the recent paper on 'High molecular gas fractions in normal massive star-forming galaxies in the young Universe."

During the COVID-19 pandemic, Tacconi was elected a foreign member of the Royal Swedish Academy of Sciences for her "extraordinary research in the field of millimeter astronomy and her commitment to European astronomy." She was also elected the president of the European Southern Observatory Council's main governing body.
