= PairGain Technologies =

U.S. telecommunications equipment company and DSL pioneer (1988–2000)

- Industry: Telecommunications equipment
- Founded: 1988
- Defunct: 2000
- Fate: Acquired by ADC Telecommunications
- Headquarters: Tustin, California, U.S.
- Website: pairgain.com at the Wayback Machine (archived 1998-06-27)

PairGain Technologies Inc. was an American telecommunications equipment manufacturer founded in 1988 and headquartered in Tustin, California.

The company became an early commercial leader in high-bit-rate digital subscriber line (HDSL) systems and digital pair-gain subscriber carrier equipment during the 1990s broadband expansion. Industry reporting credited PairGain with early dominance in HDSL transmission equipment during the initial business broadband rollout of the early 1990s.

In 2000, PairGain was acquired by ADC Telecommunications in a stock transaction valued at approximately US$1.6 billion.

== Pair gain technology ==
The company’s name referenced the telecommunications concept of pair gain, in which multiple voice or data channels are carried over a single copper pair using multiplexing or concentration techniques. PairGain’s early products were associated with subscriber carrier and copper-loop capacity expansion technologies before the company expanded into DSL transmission systems.

== History ==
=== Founding and early growth ===
The company was founded in 1988.

PairGain was established by engineers including Howard S. Flagg and Ben Itri, both graduates of The Cooper Union.

IEEE Spectrum reported that former TRW engineers founded PairGain to develop DSL transceivers and introduced an HDSL system that achieved substantial early market share in business broadband deployments.

PairGain completed an initial public offering in 1993.

=== Market position and expansion ===
During the mid-to-late 1990s broadband expansion, PairGain expanded into:

- HDSL and HDSL2 access systems
- Subscriber carrier systems
- T1/E1 access platforms
- DSL line cards and DSLAM equipment
- Licensed DSL chipset designs

EE Times described PairGain as an early DSL specialist that promoted HDSL solutions in the early 1990s and later supported both symmetric and asymmetric DSL technologies.

Fiscal year 1999 revenue was reported at approximately $224.9 million.

=== Microelectronics divestiture ===
In 1999, the company sold its microelectronics design group.

=== 1999 investigation and internet hoax ===
In 1999, two executives were probed in a criminal investigation.

Separately, a fabricated online takeover report in April 1999 temporarily inflated PairGain’s share price.

The U.S. Securities and Exchange Commission later filed enforcement action against the individual responsible.

=== Acquisition ===
PairGain was acquired by ADC Telecommunications in 2000.

== Patents and intellectual property ==
Patent databases list PairGain Technologies Inc. as assignee on multiple U.S. patents relating to DSL transmission and pair-gain systems.

Representative patents include:

- US 5198818, "Oversampled digital-to-analog converter for multilevel data transmission", issued 1993-03-30
- US 5864592, "Timing recovery system for digital subscriber line transceivers", issued 1999-01-26
- US 6404855, "Conditioner unit for pair gain test controller", issued 2002-06-11

== Legacy ==
Following its acquisition, PairGain’s DSL and subscriber carrier technologies were integrated into ADC Telecommunications’ broadband access portfolio.

The company is frequently cited in retrospective accounts of early DSL commercialization and the expansion of broadband services over legacy copper telephone infrastructure.
