= Nydia =

Nydia is a feminine given name. Notable people with the name include:

- Alba Nydia Díaz (born 1955), Puerto Rican actress
- Carmen Nydia Velázquez, Puerto Rican comedian and singer
- Irma Nydia Vázquez (1929–2019), Miss Puerto Rico 1948
- Nydia Caro (born 1948), American and Puerto Rican actress and singer
- Nydia Blas (born 1981), American photographer
- Nydia Ecury (1926–2012), Aruban-Dutch writer, translator and actress
- Nydia Lamarque (1906–1982), Argentine poet
- Nydia Pereyra-Lizaso (1920–1998), Uruguayan composer, pianist, and music educator
- Nydia Quintero Turbay (1932–2025), Colombian civic leader and philanthropist, First Lady of Colombia (1978–1982)
- Nydia Rojas (born 1980), American singer
- Nydia Velázquez (born 1953), Puerto Rican American politician in the United States House of Representatives since 1993
- Nydia Westman (1902–1970), American actress and singer
