= Xylan Corporation =

- Logo as of 1998
- Industry: Computer networking equipment
- Founded: 1 January 1993
- Defunct: 1999
- Fate: Acquired by Alcatel
- Headquarters: Calabasas, United States
- Website: xylan.com at the Wayback Machine (archived 1998-06-30)

Logo as of 1997

Xylan Corporation was an American computer networking equipment company.

The company was acquired by Alcatel for US$2 billion in 1999.
