= BookCrossing =

Book exchange website

- Website title of bookcrossing.com
- Available in: Multilanguage
- Website: bookcrossing.com
- Commercial: No
- Registration: Yes
- Launched: April 21, 2001; 25 years ago

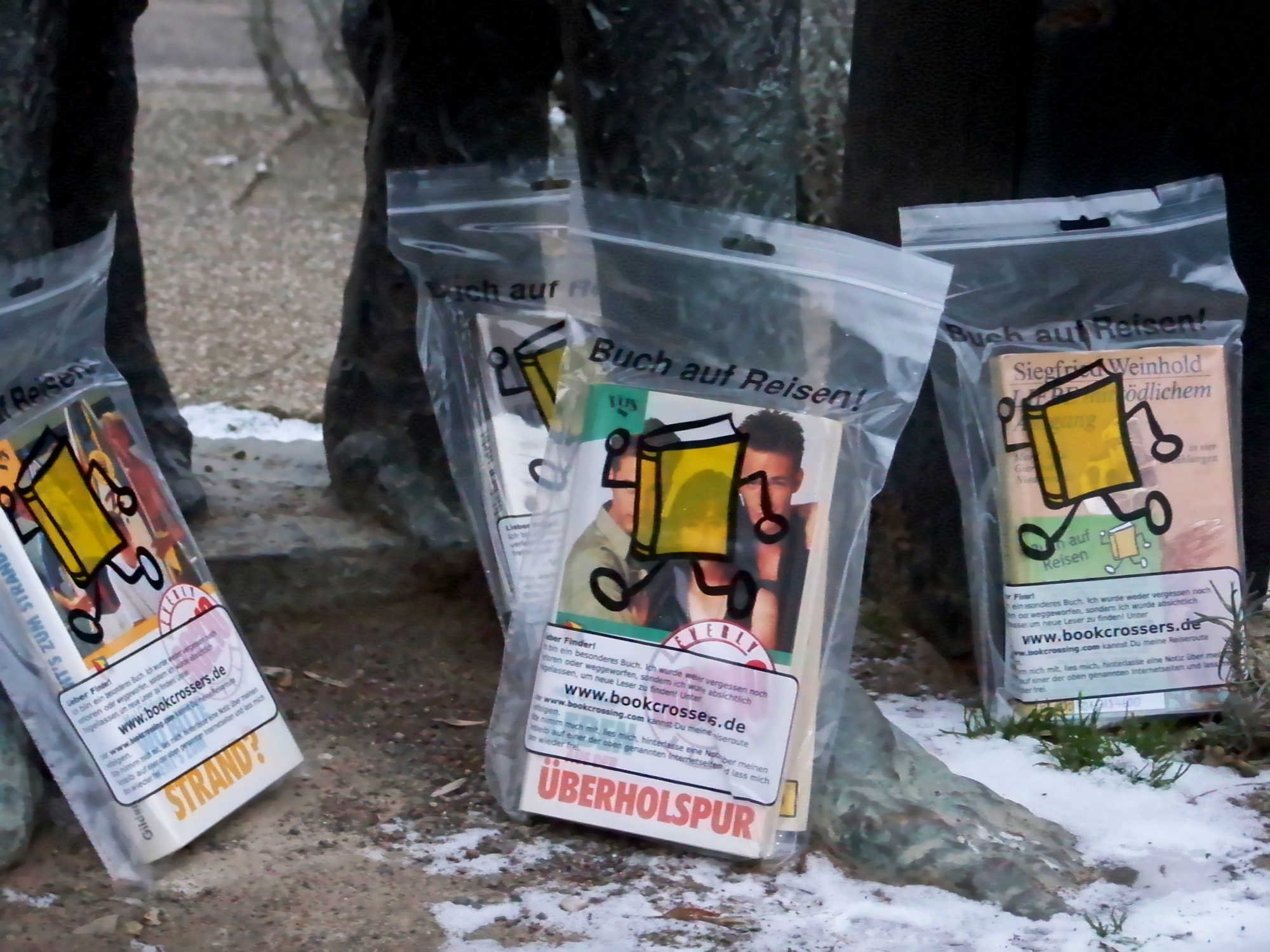
A Bookcrossing in Leipzig southwest of Berlin, Germany, December 2009

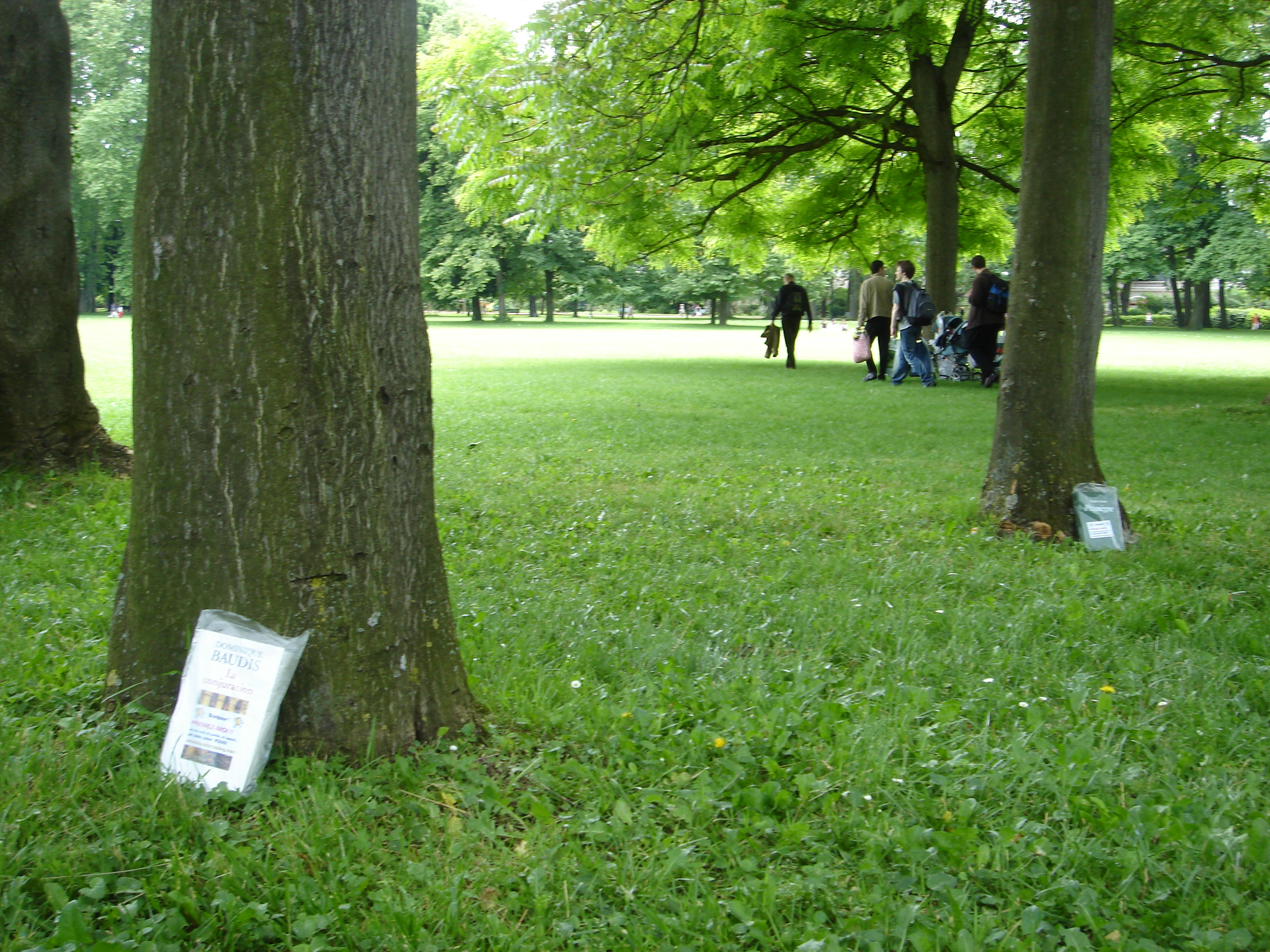
Bookcrossing in Lyon northeast of Nîmes, France, May 2006

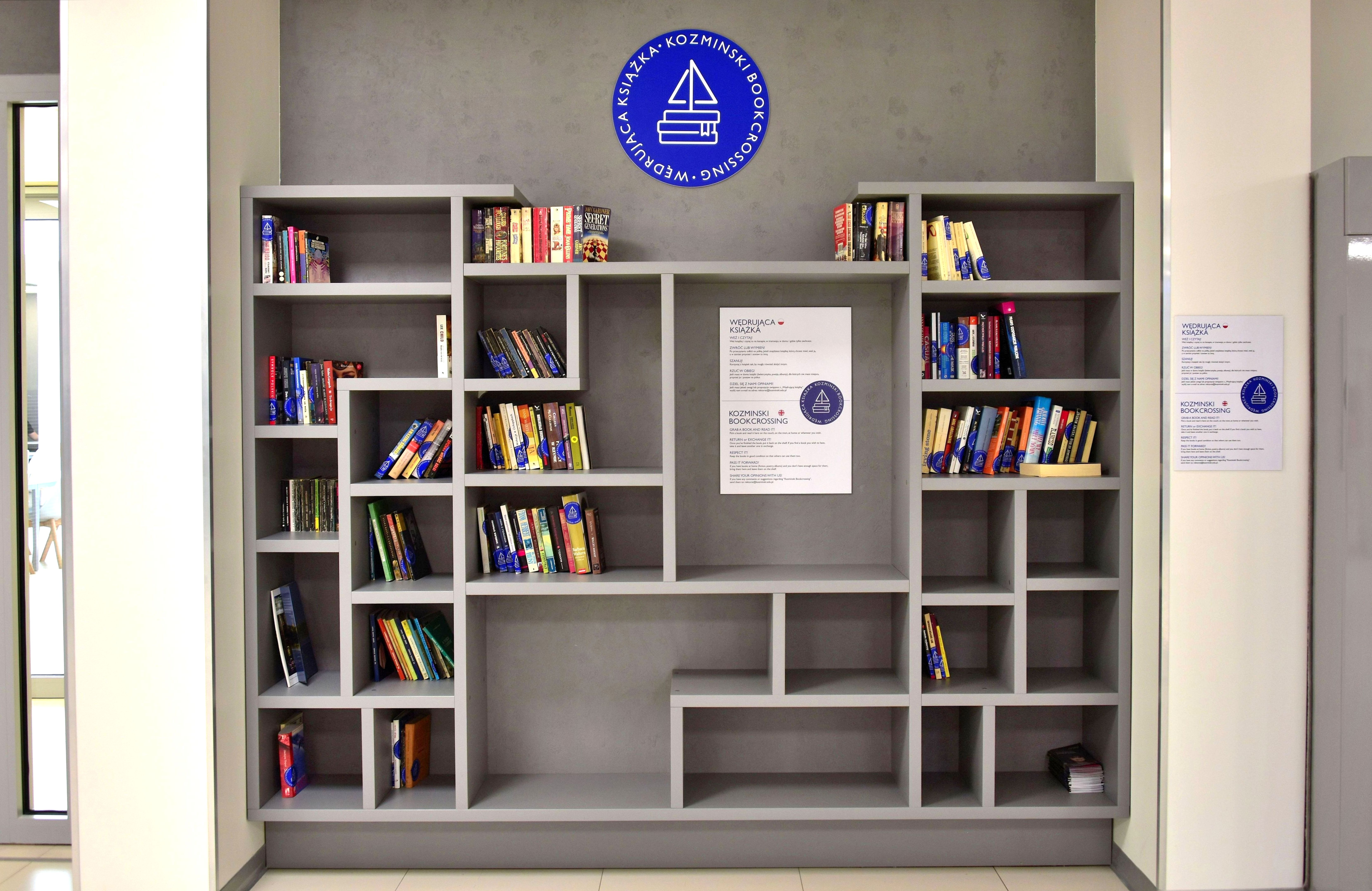
A Bookcrossing at Kozminski University in Warsaw, May 2019

BookCrossing (also known as BC, BCing or BXing) is defined as the practice of leaving a book in a public place to be 'caught' by others, who may then do likewise. The term is derived from bookcrossing.com, a free online book community which was founded in 2001 to encourage the practice, aiming to "make the whole world a library."

The "crossing" or exchanging of books may take any of a number of forms, including the 'wild-release' of a book in public places (when the receiver of the book is unknown), controlled release (when the receiver of the book is known) with other members of the websites, or "book rings" in which books travel in a set order to participants who want to read a certain book. The community aspect of BookCrossing.com has grown and expanded in ways which were not expected at the outset, in the form of blog or forum discussions, mailing lists, and holding annual conventions throughout the world.

== History ==
The idea for what is now known as BookCrossing was conceived in March 2001 by Ron Hornbaker in the US. Business partners and co-founders Bruce and Heather Pedersen collaborated with Hornbaker to launch BookCrossing.com on April 21, 2001. Both Bruce and Hornbaker have been veterinarians and Heather was a stockbroker.

After two years the website had over 113,000 members and by 2004 it was prominent enough to be referenced in an episode of the Australian soap opera Neighbours. In the same year it appeared as a new word in the Concise Oxford Dictionary, although as of 2017, only the Collins English dictionary retained it as a word.

As of February 2026, there are over 1.2 million members throughout 179 countries, by whom over 25,000 books were released in the wild in the previous 30 days across more than 60 countries. Germany accounted for 19.1% of these wild releases, followed by the United States (12.5%), Italy (5.6%), the United Kingdom (4.7%), the Netherlands (3.7%), France (2.4%), Spain (2.0%), Australia (2.0%), and Brazil (1.9%).

In July 2007 Singapore became the first country to give the practice official status, designating 2,000 locations in the country as 'hotspots', similar to Official BookCrossing Zones (OBCZ), in an initiative launched with the National Library of Singapore. The world's first official International BookCrossing Day took place on 21 April 2014. BookCrossing is actively developing in the countries of Eastern Europe, in particular Ukraine since 2021 in small and large cities.

=== Awards ===
In May 2005 BookCrossing.com won two People's Voice awards in the Webby Awards for best community website and best social/networking website. BookCrossing was also featured in a BBC Radio project broadcast as 84 Book Crossing Road, which involved releasing 84 copies of Helene Hanff's book 84 Charing Cross Road around the world. The program was nominated for a Sony Radio Academy Award in 2006.

== Process ==
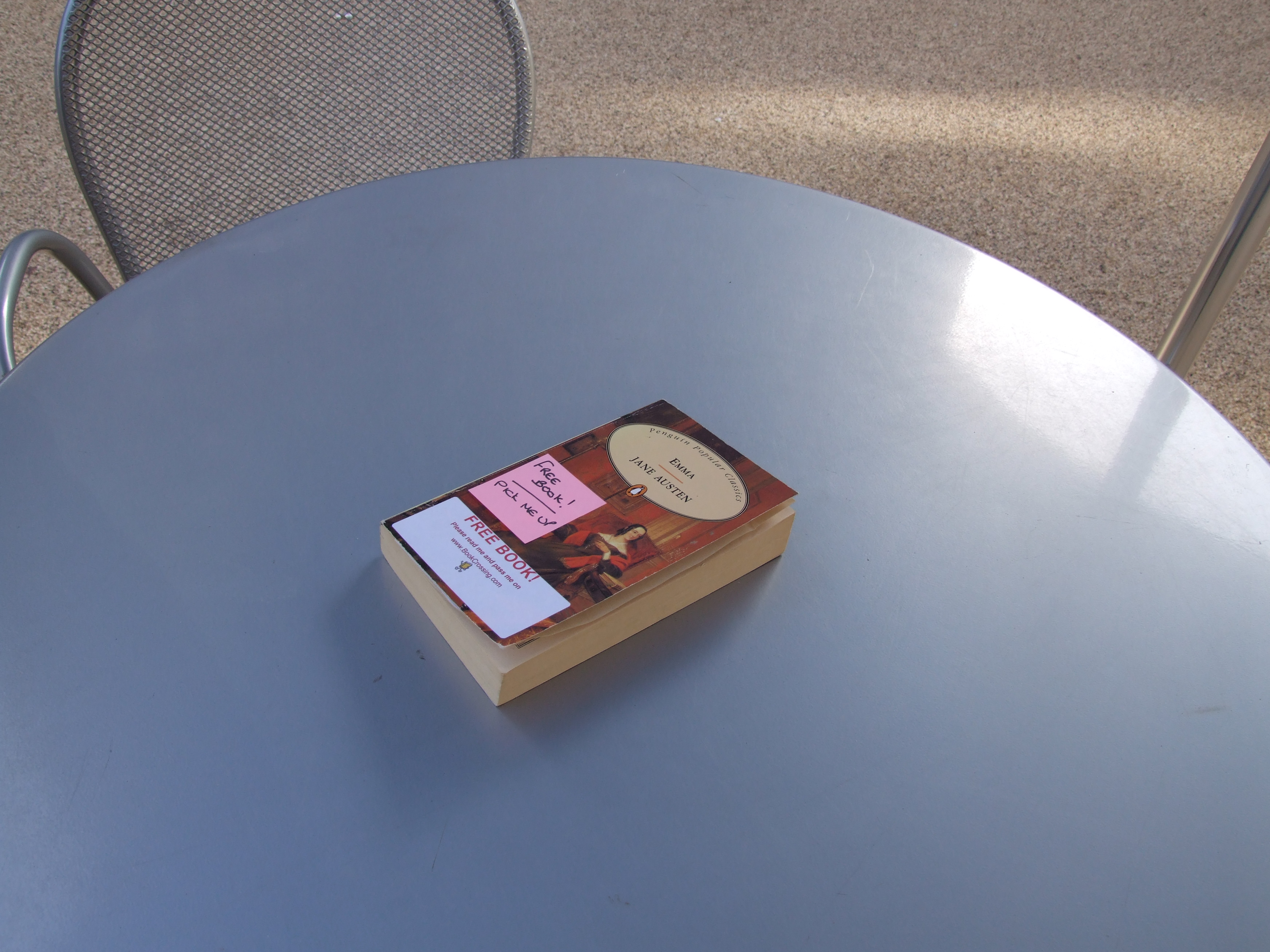
An example of Bookcrossing, where a book is left on a public table for someone to take. A Jane Austen book is placed outside the Flatiron Building. October 2008

Anyone who wishes to officially participate in "releasing" books, whether leaving in a public place or passing it on to a friend, may register on the BookCrossing.com website, although there is the option to remain anonymous when "catching" or recording the find of a book. BookCrossing.com users can 'go hunting', where a member will go to the website to view a list of books that have recently been "released", then go to the location it was left to "catch" it.

Books may also be left at "Official BookCrossing Zones" (OBCZs), which are in certain coffee shops, cafes, and restaurants, or other public places. The purpose of the zones is to motivate current members in the area to leave books to share with the public. It advertises BookCrossing and adds more members.

== Conventions ==
There is a BookCrossing anniversary convention held each year, where BookCrossers come together to enjoy organized literary-related events and release books together.

The location of the convention changes each year; here is a list of past and forthcoming conventions:

Location	Year
St Albans, England	July 2026
Wageningen, the Netherlands	2025
Tampere, Finland	2024
Falkirk, Scotland	2023
Tampere, Finland	2021—cancelled
Gold Coast, Australia	2020—cancelled
Mainz, Germany	2019
Bordeaux, France	2018
Oslo, Norway	2017
Athens, Greece	2016
Oxford, UK	2015
Melbourne, Australia	2014
Gothenburg, Sweden	2013
Dublin, Ireland	2012
Washington, D.C., United States	2011
Amsterdam, Netherlands	2010
Christchurch, New Zealand	2009
London, United Kingdom	2008
Charleston, SC, United States	2007
Toronto, Canada	2006
Fort Worth, TX, USA	2005
St. Louis, MO, USA	2004

Many unofficial conventions or "un-conventions" take place at other locations and times throughout the year, making it easier for BookCrossers who cannot travel internationally for the convention, to gather and share their love of books.

== Controversy and criticism ==
In 2003, BookCrossing was criticized by the astrologer and novelist Jessica Adams, who claimed that books were being "devalued" by the website as BookCrossing could lead to lower sales of books and, therefore, the reduction in royalties being paid to authors. Most BookCrossers dispute this argument, however. They claim that the website introduces readers to authors and genres that they have not read before, that the website encourages more people to take up or reclaim reading as a hobby, and that some members, having read a book that they have enjoyed, will buy extra copies to distribute through BookCrossing.

In March 2005, Caroline Martin, managing director of the publisher Harper Press, said in a speech that "book publishing as a whole has its very own potential Napster crisis in the growing practice of bookcrossing". BookCrossers rebutted the link to Napster, saying that while music file sharing involves duplicating audio files countless times, BookCrossing doesn't involve duplicating books (and also does not involve violating copyright, as books can be sold or given away freely without permission of the publisher being needed; copyright, the intellectual property, still remains with the creator or publisher).

When BookCrossing was launched, its founder, Ron Hornbaker, also believed people would compare the project to Napster, but concluded his fears were unjustified: "Surprisingly, however, both publishers and authors have been very friendly and cooperative — turns out Bookcrossing increases books sales by creating buzz about titles and renewing interest in reading".

== List of prominent book crossers ==
- Richard Bach
- R. J. Ellory
- Rich Shapero
- Jim Hawkins

== See also ==
- Book sales club
- Book swapping: contains a list of other book-swapping websites
- Gift economy
- Give-away shop
- Library
- Little Free Library
- Postcrossing
- Public bookcase
- Reuse
- Sharing
