= Letternet =

Letternet was a club that facilitated pen-pal relationships worldwide. It was founded in 1997 by Deutsche Post AG.. With a peak membership of over 1.4 million across more than 170 countries Letternet was the largest service of its kind. The club was discontinued on January 16, 2014..

== History ==
Until 2008, membership required submitting a questionnaire with personal details such as an address and interests. Suitable pen pals were selected from a database and their addresses sent to the member. Selection criteria included gender, nationality, interests and language.The selection criteria included: gender, nationality, interests and language.

With the switch to an online portal in 2009, online registration with personal data such as address and personal preferences was necessary. The new members were then able to search for suitable pen pals around the world in a database. The desired pen pal was sent a contact request directly online. As soon as he confirmed the contact request, both were shown the other's postal address. Now they could start writing letters. On January 16, 2014, Letternet was shut down. The relationship between costs and demand was no longer in equilibrium..

== Lettermag ==
Lettermag was the quarterly club magazine of Letternet, sent to every registered member. Initially, there was a single standard edition, but from August 2003, a version named Lettermag Young—aimed at children and young people—was also produced.Both versions of Lettermag were eventually discontinued in favor of the Letternet website. The Letternet online portal subsequently featured articles on cultural events and country profiles, thereby providing background information on the members' home countries.
