= Gabriella De Lucia =

Italian astrophysicist

Gabriella De Lucia (born 1976) is an Italian astrophysicist specializing in the mathematical modeling of galaxy formation and evolution. She is a member of the team for the Galaxy Evolution and Assembly model (GAEA), a semi-analytic tool for modeling galaxies at a cosmological scale, and is a senior researcher at the Astronomical Observatory of Trieste.

== Education and career ==
De Lucia received a laurea in physics from the University of Naples Federico II in 2000, with research advised by Massimo Capaccioli and Magda Arnaboldi. She continued her studies at the Max Planck Institute for Astrophysics, and completed a Ph.D. in 2004 through LMU Munich. Her dissertation, Evolution of galaxies in clusters, was supervised by Simon White and Guinevere Kauffmann. She obtained an Italian habilitation in 2012.

After her doctorate, she continued at the Max Planck Institute for Astrophysics as a postdoctoral researcher from 2004 to 2009. She joined the National Institute for Astrophysics as a researcher at the Astronomical Observatory of Trieste in 2009, initially for a fixed-term five-year research position, and continuing with a permanent position in 2013. She was promoted to senior researcher in 2016.

== Recognition ==
De Lucia was named as an officer in the Order of Merit of the Italian Republic in 2011.

De Lucia was the 2013 recipient of the Merac Prize for Best Early Career Researcher in Theoretical Astrophysicist, awarded by the Merac Foundation and European Astronomical Society. She was a 2017 recipient of the Friedrich Wilhelm Bessel Research Award of the Alexander von Humboldt Foundation.
