= Coil =

Coil or COIL may refer to:

== Geometry ==
- Helix, a space curve that winds around a line
- Spiral, a curve that winds around a central point

== Science and technology ==
- Coil (chemistry), a tube used to cool and condense steam from a distillation
- Coil spring, used to store energy, absorb shock, or maintain a force between two surfaces
- Inductor or coil, a passive two-terminal electrical component
- Electromagnetic coil, formed when a conductor is wound around a core or form to create an inductor or electromagnet
  - Induction coil, a type of electrical transformer used to produce high-voltage pulses from a low-voltage direct current supply
    - Ignition coil, used in internal combustion engines to create a pulse of high voltage for a spark plug
- Intrauterine device or coil, a contraceptive device
- Chemical oxygen iodine laser, a near–infrared chemical laser
- Coil, a binary digit or bit in some communication protocols such as Modbus
- COIL, the gene that encodes the protein coilin
- Coiled tubing, a long metal pipe which is supplied spooled on a large reel

== Music ==
- Coil (band), an English experimental band
- Coil (album), a 1997 album by Toad the Wet Sprocket
- "Coil", a song by Opeth from Watershed

== Fictional entities ==
- The Coil, a fictional organization in the G.I. Joe universe
- Magnemite or Coil, a Pokémon character
- Coil, a crime lord from the web serial Worm

== People with the surname ==
- Alison Coil, American astrophysicist
- Liam Mac Cóil, Irish novelist

== Other uses ==
- Coil (hieroglyph), an Egyptian hieratic hieroglyph
- Coiled basketry, using grasses, rushes and pine needles
- Coiling (pottery), a method of creating pottery
- Coil (video game), a video game by Edmund McMillen and Florian Himsl
- Turmoil or burden, as in mortal coil
- Coiling, a method for storing rope or cable

== See also ==
- Helix (disambiguation)
- Loop (disambiguation)
- Spiral (disambiguation)
