= Coiled coil (disambiguation) =

Coiled coil may refer to:

- Coiled coil, a structural motif in proteins
- Coiled coil filament, a type of filament in incandescent light bulbs

== See also ==
- Coil (disambiguation)
