= Forward pass =

Gridiron football play

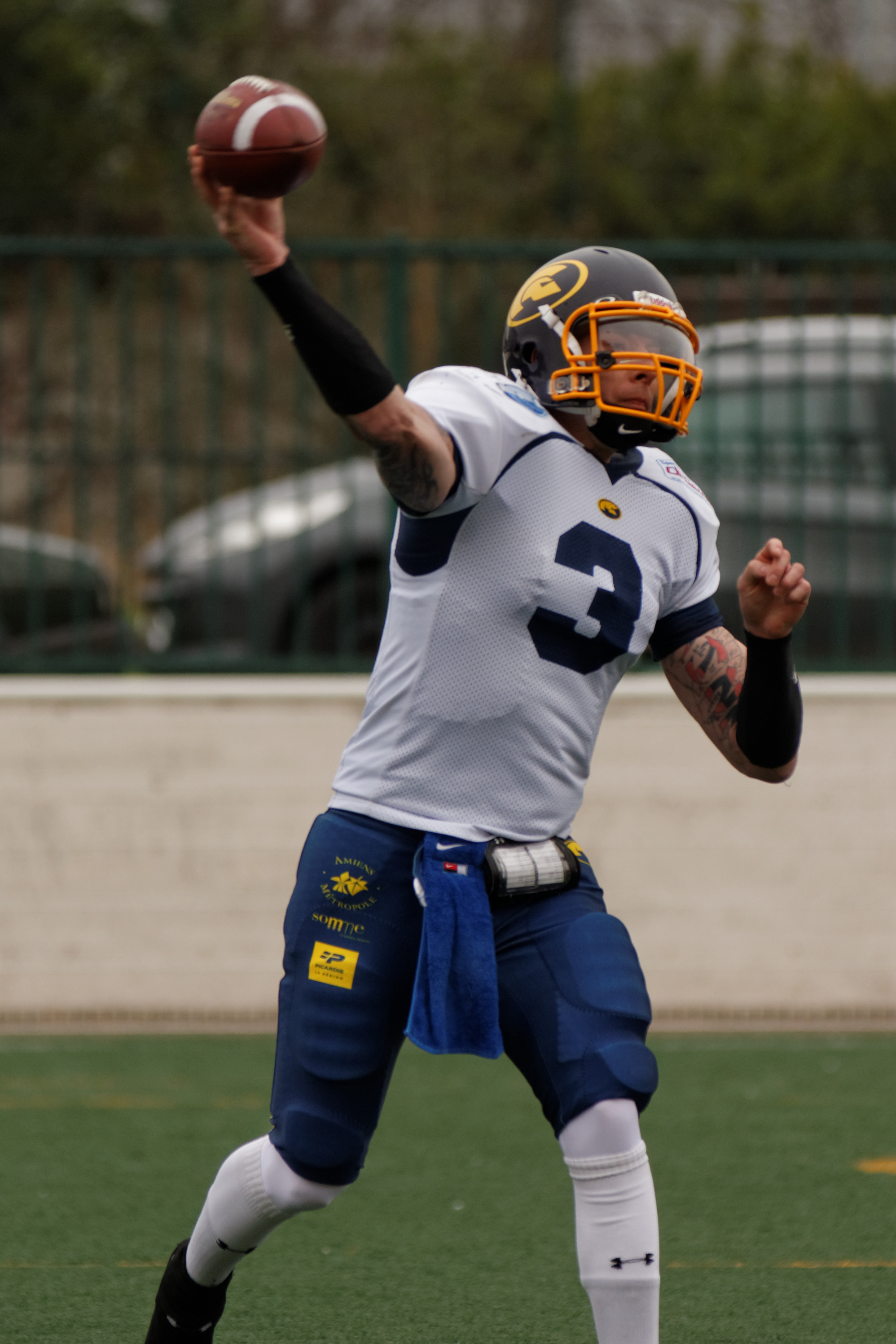
A quarterback releasing the ball for a forward pass

In several forms of football, a forward pass is the throwing of the ball in the direction in which the offensive team is trying to move, towards the defensive team's goal line. The legal and widespread use of the forward pass distinguishes gridiron football (American football and Canadian football) from rugby football (union and league) in which the play is illegal. The primary passer is the quarterback, and statistical analysis is used to determine a quarterback's success rate at passing in various situations, as well as a team's overall success at the passing game.

Illegal and experimental forward passes had been attempted as early as 1876, but the first legal forward pass in American football took place in 1906, after a change in the rules. Another rule change on January 18, 1951, established that no center or guard could receive a forward pass, and a tackle may only do so if he announces his intent to the referee beforehand that he will be an eligible receiver, called a tackle-eligible play. The only linemen who can receive a forward pass are the ends (tight ends and wide receivers). The rules regulate who may throw and who may receive a forward pass, and under what circumstances, as well as how the defensive team may try to prevent a pass from being completed.

== Gridiron football ==
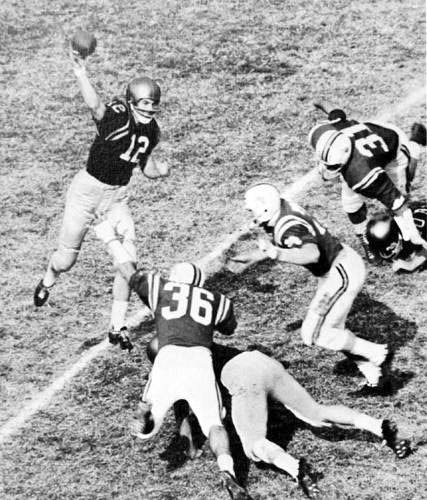
Navy Midshipmen quarterback Roger Staubach throwing a pass against the Maryland Terrapins just as the pocket collapses in 1964.

In gridiron football, a forward pass is usually referred to simply as a pass, and consists of a player throwing the football towards the opponent's goal line. This is permitted only once during a scrimmage down by the offensive team before team possession has changed, provided the pass is thrown from behind the line of scrimmage; a pass is legal as long as some part of the passer's body is behind the line of scrimmage. The person passing the ball must be a member of the offensive team, and the recipient of the forward pass must be an eligible receiver and must touch the passed ball before any ineligible player. An illegal forward pass can incur a yardage penalty and the loss of a down, although it may be legally intercepted by the opponents and advanced.

If an eligible receiver on the passing team legally catches the ball, the pass is completed and the receiver may attempt to advance the ball. If an opposing player legally catches the ball—all defensive players are eligible receivers—it is an interception. That player's team immediately gains possession of the ball and he may attempt to advance the ball toward his opponent's goal. If no player is able to legally catch the ball it is an incomplete pass and the ball becomes dead the moment it touches the ground. It will then be returned to the original line of scrimmage for the next down. If any player interferes with an eligible receiver's ability to catch the ball it is pass interference which draws a penalty of varying degrees, depending upon the particular league's rules.

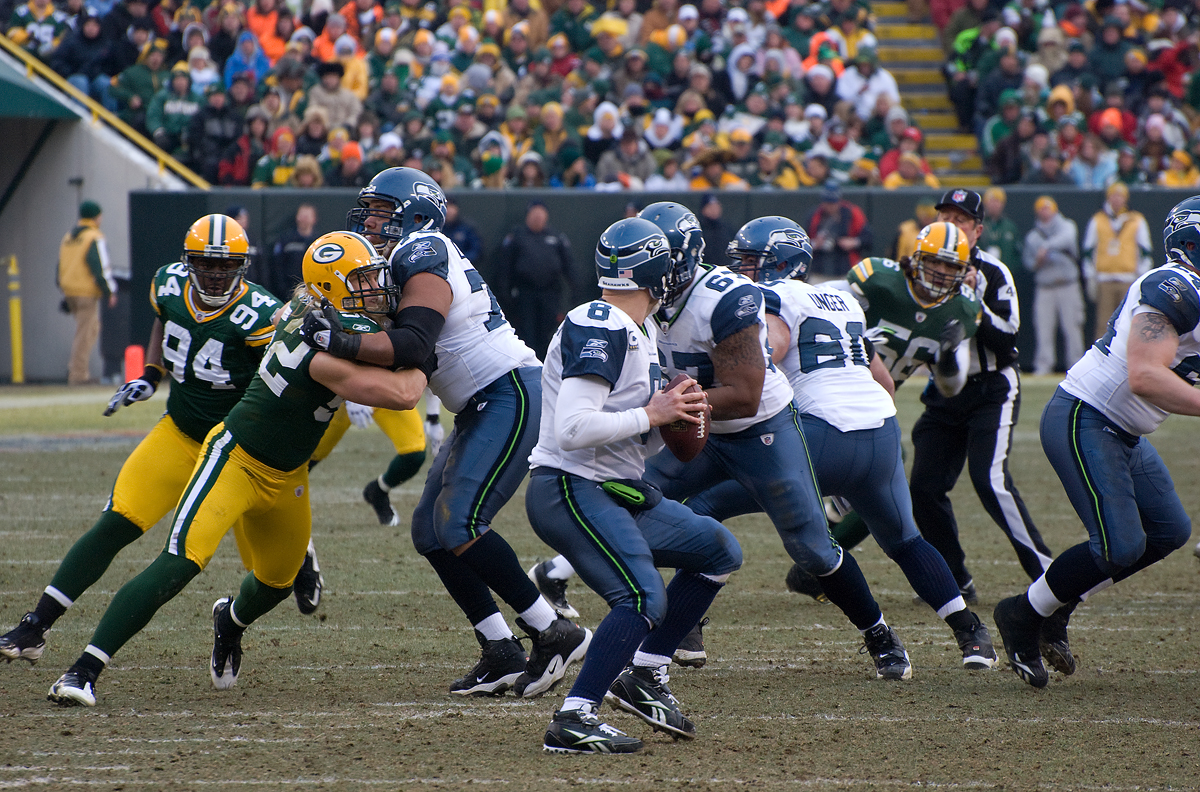
Matt Hasselbeck of the Seattle Seahawks dropping back to pass against the Green Bay Packers during a 2009 game.

The moment that a forward pass begins is important to the game. The pass begins the moment the passer's arm begins to move forward. If the passer drops the ball before this moment it is a fumble and therefore a loose ball. In this case anybody can gain possession of the ball before or after it touches the ground. If the passer drops the ball while his arm is moving forward it is a forward pass, regardless of where the ball lands or is first touched. At some levels of play, a video replay may be required for the game's officials to conclusively determine if a play is a fumble or a forward pass.

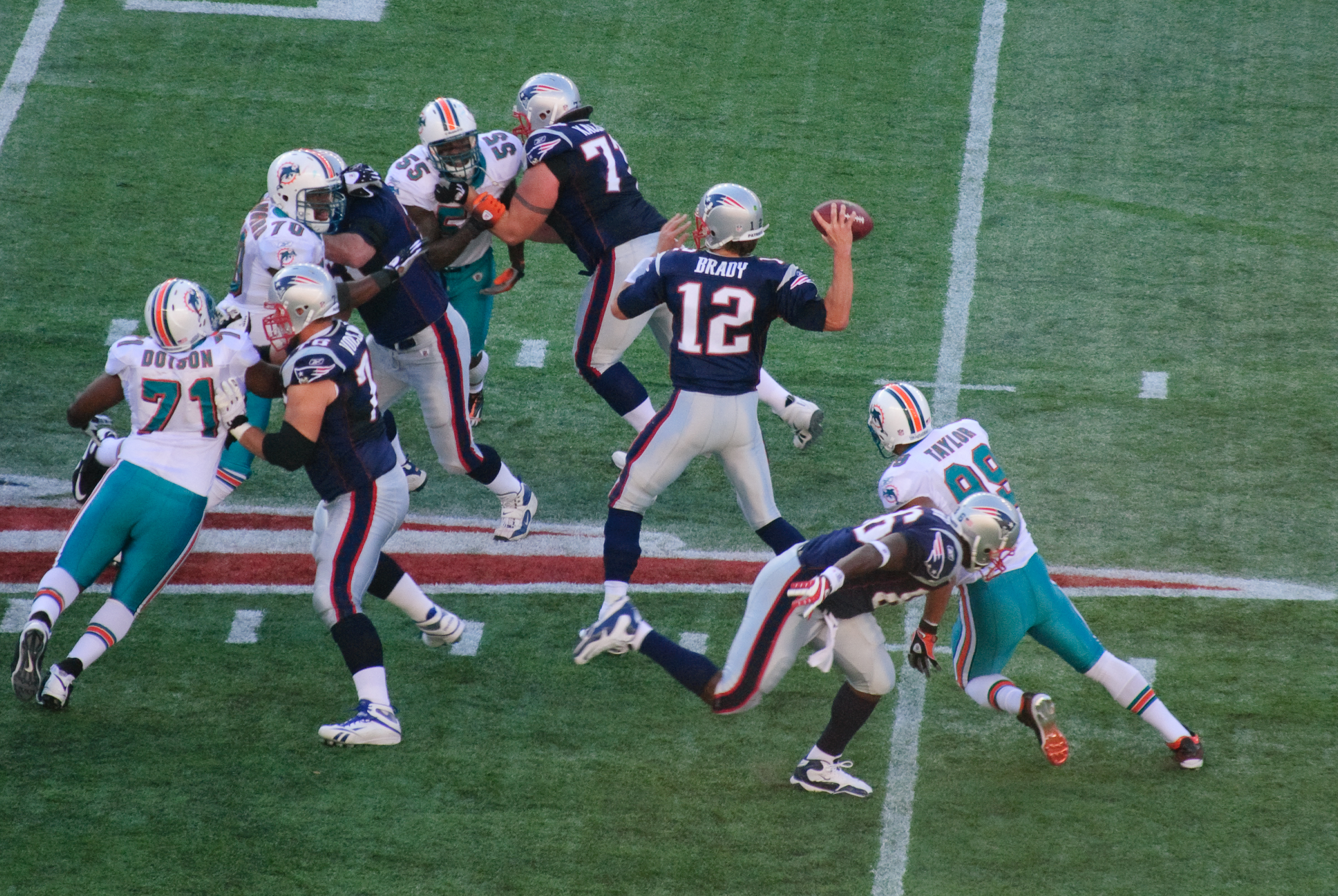
Tom Brady throwing a pass against the Miami Dolphins during a 2009 game.

The quarterback generally either starts a few paces behind the line of scrimmage or drops back a few steps after the ball is snapped. This places him in an area called the "pocket", which is a specific protective region formed by the offensive blockers up front and between the tackles on each side. A quarterback who runs out of this pocket is said to be scrambling. Under NFL and NCAA rules, once the quarterback moves out of the pocket the ball may be legally thrown away to prevent a sack. NFHS (high school) rules do not allow for a passer to intentionally throw an incomplete forward pass to save loss of yardage or conserve time, except for a spike to conserve time after a hand-to-hand snap. If he throws the ball away while still in the pocket then a foul called "intentional grounding" is assessed. In Canadian football the passer must simply throw the ball across the line of scrimmage—whether he is inside or outside of the "pocket"—to avoid the foul of "intentionally grounding".

If a forward pass is caught near a sideline or endline it is a complete pass (or an interception) only if a receiver catches the ball "in bounds". For a pass to be ruled complete in-bounds, either one or two feet must touch the ground within the field boundaries after the ball is first grasped, depending on the league rules. In the NFL the receiver must touch the ground with both feet, but in most other codes—CFL, college football and high school—one foot in bounds is sufficient.

Common to all gridiron codes is the notion of control: a receiver must demonstrate control of the ball in order to be ruled in "possession" of it, while still in bounds. If the receiver handles the ball but the official determines that he was still "bobbling" it prior to the end of the play, then the pass will be ruled incomplete. Similarly, if the receiver fails to continue to control the ball after falling to the ground, the pass may be ruled incomplete.

=== Early illegal and experimental passes ===
The forward pass had been attempted at least 30 years before the play was actually made legal. Passes "had been carried out successfully but illegally several times, including the 1876 Yale–Princeton game in which Yale's Walter Camp threw forward to teammate Oliver Thompson as he was being tackled. Princeton's protest, one account said, went for naught when the referee 'tossed a coin to make his decision and allowed the touchdown to stand' ".

The University of North Carolina used the forward pass in an 1895 game against the University of Georgia. However, the play was still illegal at the time. Bob Quincy stakes Carolina's claim in his 1973 book They Made the Bell Tower Chime:

John Heisman, namesake of the Heisman Trophy, wrote 30 years later that, indeed, the Tar Heels had given birth to the forward pass against the Bulldogs (UGA). It was conceived to break a scoreless deadlock and give UNC a 6–0 win. The Carolinians were in a punting situation and a Georgia rush seemed destined to block the ball. The punter, with an impromptu dash to his right, tossed the ball and it was caught by George Stephens, who ran 70 yards for a touchdown.

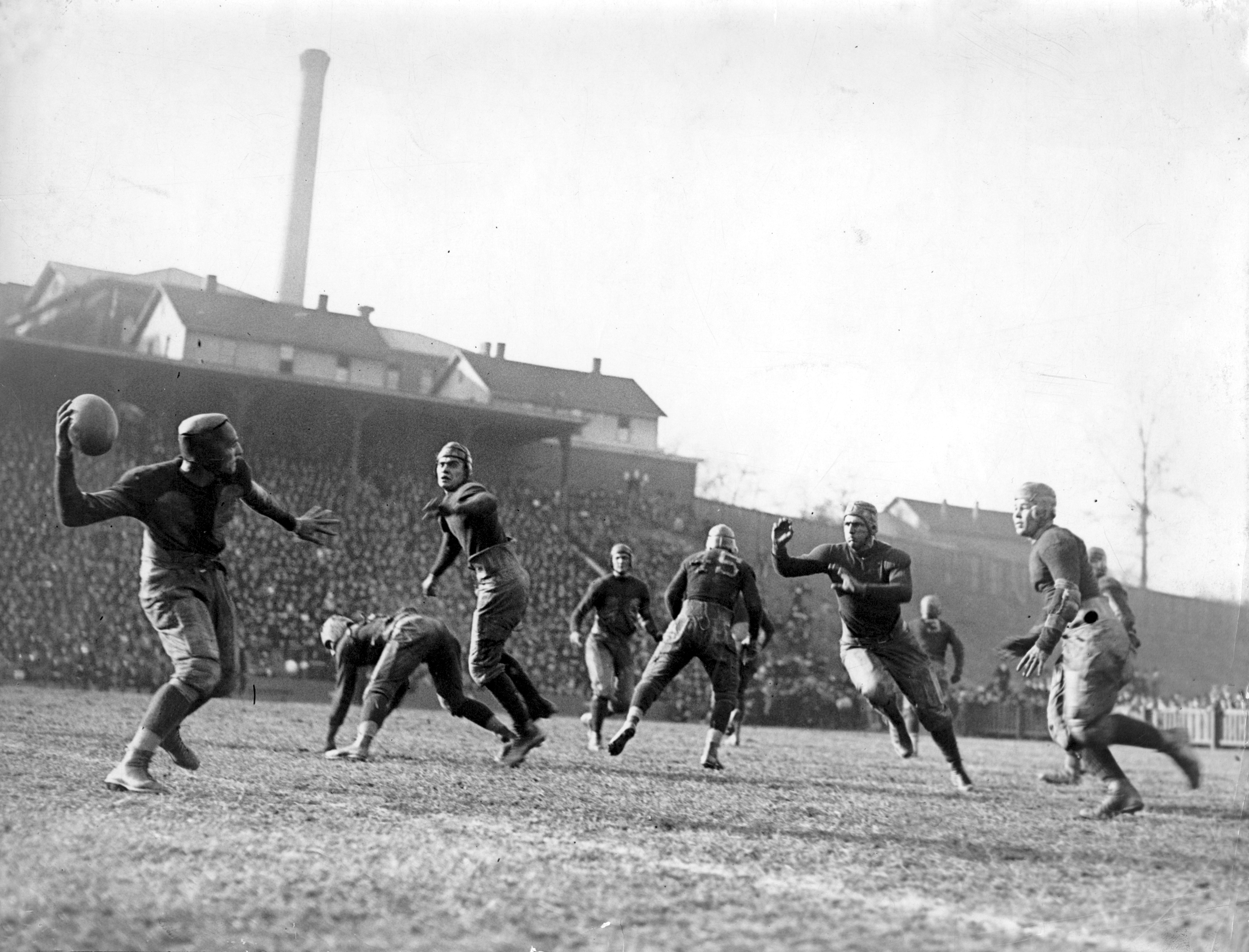
A pass in the 1921 Georgia Tech versus Auburn game

In a 1905 experimental game at Wichita, Kansas, Washburn University and Fairmount College (what would become Wichita State) used the pass before new rules allowing the play were approved in early 1906. Credit for the first pass goes to Fairmount's Bill Davis, who completed a pass to Art Solter.

1905 had been a bloody year on the gridiron; the Chicago Tribune reported 19 players had been killed and 159 seriously injured that season. There were moves to outlaw the game, but United States President Theodore Roosevelt personally intervened and demanded that the rules of the game be reformed. In a meeting of more than 60 schools in late 1905, the commitment was made to make the game safer. This meeting was the first step toward the establishment of what would become the NCAA and was followed by several sessions to work out "the new rules".

The final meeting of the Rules Committee tasked with reshaping the game was held on April 6, 1906, at which time the forward pass officially became a legal play. The New York Times reported in September 1906 on the rationale for the changes: "The main efforts of the football reformers have been to 'open up the game'—that is to provide for the natural elimination of the so-called mass plays and bring about a game in which speed and real skill shall supersede so far as possible mere brute strength and force of weight." However, the Times also reflected widespread skepticism as to whether the forward pass could be effectively integrated into the game: "There has been no team that has proved that the forward pass is anything but a doubtful, dangerous play to be used only in the last extremity." John Heisman was instrumental in the rules' acceptance.

In Canadian football, the first exhibition game using a forward pass was held on November 5, 1921, at McGill University in Montreal, Quebec, Canada, between the McGill Redmen football team and visiting American college football team the Syracuse Orangemen from Syracuse University. The game was organized by Frank Shaughnessy, the head coach of McGill. McGill player Robert "Boo" Anderson is credited with the first forward pass attempt in Canadian football history.

The forward pass was not officially allowed in Canadian football until 1929.

=== First legal pass ===
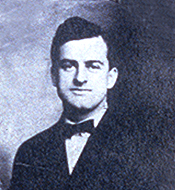
Eddie Cochems, "Father of the Forward Pass", pictured in 1907

Most sources credit Saint Louis University's Bradbury Robinson from Bellevue, Ohio with throwing the first legal forward pass. However, this has recently been debunked. On September 22, 1906, Bates College sophomore quarterback Stephen Cobb completed the first legal forward pass in college football history, connecting with freshman Ralph Cummings. On September 25, 1906, in a game against Carroll College, Robinson's first attempt at a forward pass fell incomplete and resulted in a turnover under the 1906 rules. In the same game, Robinson later completed a 20-yard touchdown pass to Jack Schneider. The 1906 Saint Louis University team, coached by Eddie Cochems, was undefeated at 11–0 and featured the most potent offense in the country, outscoring their opponents 407–11. Football authority and College Football Hall of Fame coach David M. Nelson wrote that "E. B. Cochems is to forward passing what the Wright brothers are to aviation and Thomas Edison is to the electric light."

In 1952, football coach Amos Alonzo Stagg discounted accounts crediting any particular coach with being the innovator of the forward pass. Stagg noted that he had Walter Eckersall working on pass plays and saw Pomeroy Sinnock of Illinois throw many passes in 1906. Stagg summed up his view as follows: "I have seen statements giving credit to certain people originating the forward pass. The fact is that all coaches were working on it. The first season, 1906, I personally had sixty-four different forward pass patterns." In 1954, Stagg disputed Cochems' claim to have invented the forward pass:

Eddie Cochems, who coached at [Saint] Louis University in 1906, also claimed to have invented the pass as we know it today ... It isn't so, because after the forward pass was legalized in 1906, most of the schools commenced experimenting with it and nearly all used.

Stagg asserted that, as far back as 1894, before the rules committee even considered the forward pass, one of his players used to throw the ball "like a baseball pitcher".

On the other hand, Hall of Fame coach Gus Dorais told the United Press that "Eddie Cochems of the [Saint] Louis University team of 1906–07–08 deserves the full credit." Writing in Collier's more than 20 years earlier, Dorais' Notre Dame teammate Knute Rockne acknowledged Cochems as the early leader in the use of the pass, observing, "One would have thought that so effective a play would have been instantly copied and become the vogue. The East, however, had not learned much or cared much about Midwest and Western football. Indeed, the East scarcely realized that football existed beyond the Alleghanies ..."

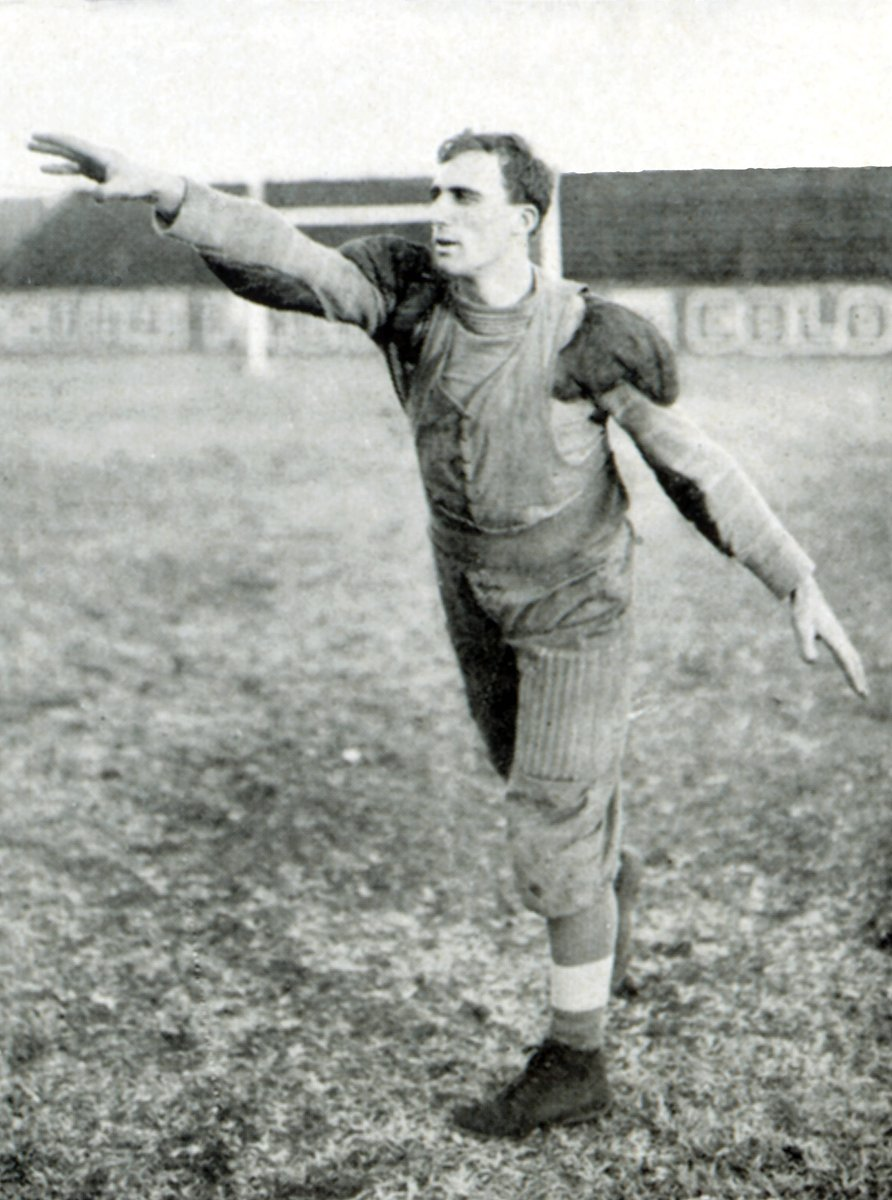
Bradbury Robinson, who threw the first legal forward pass in 1906

Once the 1906 season got underway, many programs began experimenting with the forward pass. On September 26, 1906, Villanova's game against the Carlisle Indians was billed as "the first real game of football under the new rules". In the first play from scrimmage after the opening kicks, Villanova completed a pass that "succeeded in gaining ten yards". Following the Villanova-Carlisle game, The New York Times described the new passing game this way:

The passing was more of the character of that familiar in basket ball than that which has hitherto characterized football. Apparently it is the intention of football coaches to try repeatedly these frequent long and risky passes. Well executed they are undoubtedly highly spectacular, but the risk of dropping the ball is so great as to make the practice extremely hazardous and its desirability doubtful.

Another coach sometimes credited with popularizing the overhead spiral pass in 1906 is former Princeton All-American "Bosey" Reiter. Reiter claimed to have invented the overhead spiral pass while playing professional football as a player-coach for Connie Mack's Philadelphia Athletics of the original National Football League (1902). While playing for the Athletics, Reiter was a teammate of Hawley Pierce, a former star for the Carlisle Indian School. Pierce, a Native American, taught Reiter to throw an underhand spiral pass, but Reiter had short arms and was unable to throw for distance from an underhand delivery. Accordingly, Reiter began working on an overhand spiral pass. Reiter recalled trying to imitate the motion of a baseball catcher throwing to second base. After practice and experimentation, Reiter "discovered he could get greater distance and accuracy throwing that way". In 1906, Reiter was the head coach at Wesleyan University. In the opening game of the 1906 season against Yale, Reiter's quarterback Sammy Moore completed a forward pass to Irvin van Tassell for a thirty-yard gain. The New York Times called it "the prettiest play of the day", as Wesleyan's quarterback "deftly passed the ball past the whole Yale team to his mate Van Tassel". Van Tassel later described the historic play to the United Press:

I was the right halfback, and on this formation played one yard back of our right tackle. The quarterback, Sam Moore, took the ball from center and faded eight or 10 yards back of our line. Our two ends angled down the field toward the sidelines as a decoy, and I slipped through the strong side of our line straight down the center and past the secondary defense. The pass worked perfectly. However, the quarterback coming up fast nailed me as I caught it. This brought the ball well into Yale territory, about the 20-yard line.

The football season opened for most schools during the first week of October, and the impact of the forward pass was immediate:

- On October 3, 1906, the Des Moines Daily News reported "probably the first use" of the "long forward pass" in the University of Missouri's 23–4 win over Kirksville Normal School.
- On October 4, 1906, Princeton opened its season with a 22–0 win over Stevens. Press accounts indicate that Princeton put the forward pass to good use, as "old-time football gave way to the new game".
- On October 4, 1906, the Carlisle Indians beat Susquehanna University 40–0, as "the forward pass was used for a number of good gains".
- On October 4, 1906, Harvard defeated Bowdoin 10–0 "in a hard-fought contest that was featured by a newfangled and daring forward pass that Crimson worked in the closing minutes of play".
- On October 4, 1906, Williams College defeated the Massachusetts Agricultural College, scoring the game's only touchdown on a forward pass by Waters.

Some publications credit Yale All-American Paul Veeder with the "first forward pass in a major game". Veeder threw a 20- to 30-yard completion in leading Yale past Harvard 6–0 before 32,000 fans in New Haven on November 24, 1906. However, that Yale/Harvard game was played three weeks after St. Louis completed 45- and 48-yard passes against Kansas before a crowd of 7,000 at Sportsman's Park.

=== New style of play ===
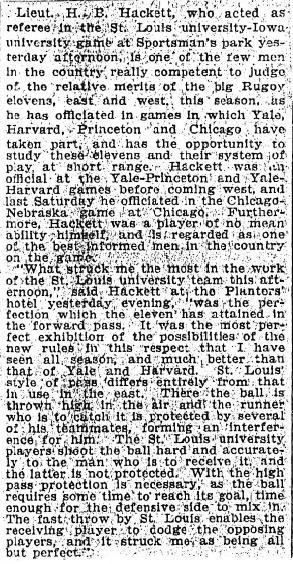
Referee Hackett's analysis of St. Louis' passing game against Iowa, St. Louis Globe-Democrat, written by Ed Wray, November 30, 1906

The forward pass was a central feature of Cochems' offensive scheme in 1906 as his St. Louis University team compiled an undefeated 11–0 season in which they outscored opponents by a combined score 407 to 11. The highlight of the campaign was St. Louis' 39–0 win over Iowa. Cochems' team reportedly completed eight passes in ten attempts for four touchdowns. "The average flight distance of the passes was twenty yards." Nelson continues, "the last play demonstrated the dramatic effect that the forward pass was having on football. St. Louis was on Iowa's thirty-five-yard line with a few seconds to play. Timekeeper Walter McCormack walked onto the field to end the game when the ball was thrown twenty-five yards and caught on the dead run for a touchdown."

The 1906 Iowa game was refereed by one of the top football officials in the country, West Point's Lt. Horatio B. "Stuffy" Hackett. He had officiated games involving the top Eastern powers that year. Hackett, who would become a member of the football rules committee in December 1907 and officiated games into the 1930s, was quoted the next day in Ed Wray's Globe-Democrat article: "It was the most perfect exhibition ... of the new rules ... that I have seen all season and much better than that of Yale and Harvard. St. Louis' style of pass differs entirely from that in use in the east. ... The St. Louis university players shoot the ball hard and accurately to the man who is to receive it ... The fast throw by St. Louis enables the receiving player to dodge the opposing players, and it struck me as being all but perfect."

Hackett is the only known expert witness to the passing offenses of both Cochems' 1906 squads and that of Stagg, who dismissed any special role for the St. Louis coach in the development of the pass. Hackett was an official in games involving both teams. As Wray recalled almost 40 years later: "Hackett told this writer that in no other game that he handled had he seen the forward pass as used by St. Louis U. nor such bewildering variations of it."

"Cochems said that the poor Iowa showing resulted from its use of the old style play and its failure to effectively use the forward pass", Nelson writes. "Iowa did attempt two basketball-style forward passes."

"During the 1906 season [Robinson] threw a sixty-seven yard pass ... and ... Schneider tossed a sixty-five yarder. Considering the size, shape and weight of the ball, these were extraordinary passes."

In 1907, after the first season of the forward pass, one football writer noted that, "with the single exception of Cochems, football teachers were groping in the dark."

Because St. Louis was geographically isolated from both the dominant teams and the major sports media (newspapers) of the era, all centered in and focused on the East, Cochems' groundbreaking offensive strategy was not picked up by the major teams. Pass-oriented offenses would not be adopted by the Eastern football powers until the next decade.

But that does not mean that other teams in the Midwest did not pick it up. Arthur Schabinger, quarterback for the College of Emporia in Kansas, was reported to have regularly used the forward pass in 1910. Coach H. W. "Bill" Hargiss' "Presbies" are said to have featured the play in a 17–0 victory over Washburn University and in a 107–0 destruction of Pittsburg State University. Coach Pop Warner at Carlisle had quarterback Frank Mount Pleasant, one of the first regular spiral pass quarterbacks in football.

=== Knute Rockne ===
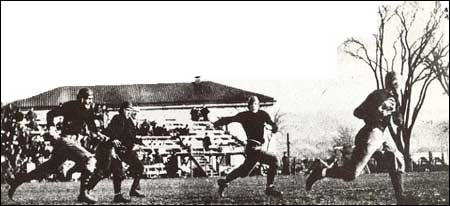
Knute Rockne of Notre Dame running away from Army after a forward pass from Gus Dorais, 1913

Knute Rockne and Gus Dorais worked on the pass while lifeguarding on a Lake Erie beach at Cedar Point in Sandusky, Ohio, during the summer of 1913. That year, Jesse Harper, Notre Dame head coach, also showed how the pass could be used by a smaller team to beat a bigger one, first utilizing it to defeat rival Army. After it was used against a major school on a national stage in this game, the forward pass rapidly gained popularity.

The 1919 and 1920 Notre Dame teams had George Gipp, an ideal handler of the forward pass, who threw for 1,789 yards.

John Mohardt led the 1921 Notre Dame team to a 10–1 record with 781 rushing yards, 995 passing yards, 12 rushing touchdowns, and nine passing touchdowns. Grantland Rice wrote that "Mohardt could throw the ball to within a foot or two of any given space" and noted that the 1921 team was the first at Notre Dame "to build its attack around a forward passing game, rather than use a forward passing game as a mere aid to the running game." Mohardt had both Eddie Anderson and Roger Kiley at end to receive his passes.

=== Increase in popularity ===
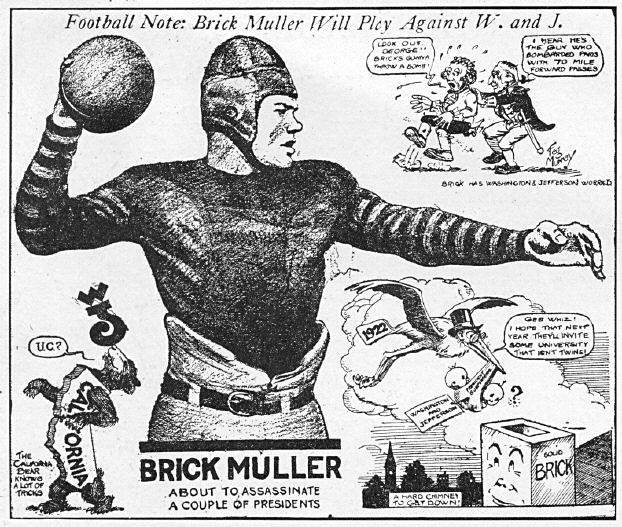
Editorial cartoon depicting Cal's Brick Muller vs. W & J College, 1922

From 1915 to 1916, Pudge Wyman and end Bert Baston of Minnesota were "one of the greatest forward-passing combinations in the history of the gridiron".

In the 1921 Rose Bowl, California's Brick Muller completed a touchdown against Washington & Jefferson which went 53 yards in the air, a feat previously thought impossible.

In a 1925, 62–13 victory over Cornell, Dartmouth's Andy Oberlander had 477 yards in total offense, including six touchdown passes, a Dartmouth record which still stands.

The 1925 Michigan team was coach Fielding H. Yost's favorite and featured the passing tandem of Benny Friedman and Bennie Oosterbaan.

Yost disciple Dan McGugin coached Vanderbilt and was one of the first emphasize the forward pass. His 1907 team beat Sewanee on a double pass play Grantland Rice cited as his biggest thrill in his years of watching sports. McGugin's 1927 team was piloted by Bill Spears, who threw for over a thousand yards. According to one writer, Vanderbilt produced "almost certainly the legit top Heisman candidate in Spears, if there had been a Heisman Trophy to award in 1927". McGugin disciple and former quarterback Ray Morrison brought the pass to the southwest when he coached Gerald Mann at Southern Methodist.

=== First pass in a professional game ===
The first forward pass in a professional football game may have been thrown in an Ohio League game played on October 25, 1906. The Ohio League, which traced its history to the 1890s, was a direct predecessor of the NFL. According to Robert W. Peterson in his book Pigskin The Early Years of Pro Football, the "passer was George W. (Peggy) Parratt, probably the best quarterback of the era", who played for the Massillon, Ohio Tigers, one of pro football's first franchises. Citing the Professional Football Researchers Association as his source, Peterson writes that "Parratt completed a short pass to end Dan Riley (real name, Dan Policowski)" in a game played at Massillon against a team from West Virginia. Since the Tigers "ran up a 61 to 0 score on the hapless Mountain Staters, the pass played no important part in the result".

According to National Football League history, it legalized the forward pass from anywhere behind the line of scrimmage on February 25, 1933. Before that rule change, a forward pass had to be made from 5 or more yards behind the line of scrimmage.

Forward passes were first permitted in Canadian football in 1929, but the tactic remained a minor part of the game for several years. Jack Jacobs of the Winnipeg Blue Bombers is recognized, not for inventing the forward pass, but for popularizing it in the Western Interprovincial Football Union (one of the forerunner leagues to the modern Canadian Football League) in the early 1950s, thus changing the Canadian game from a more run-dominated game to a more passing-dominant game.

=== Change in ball shape ===
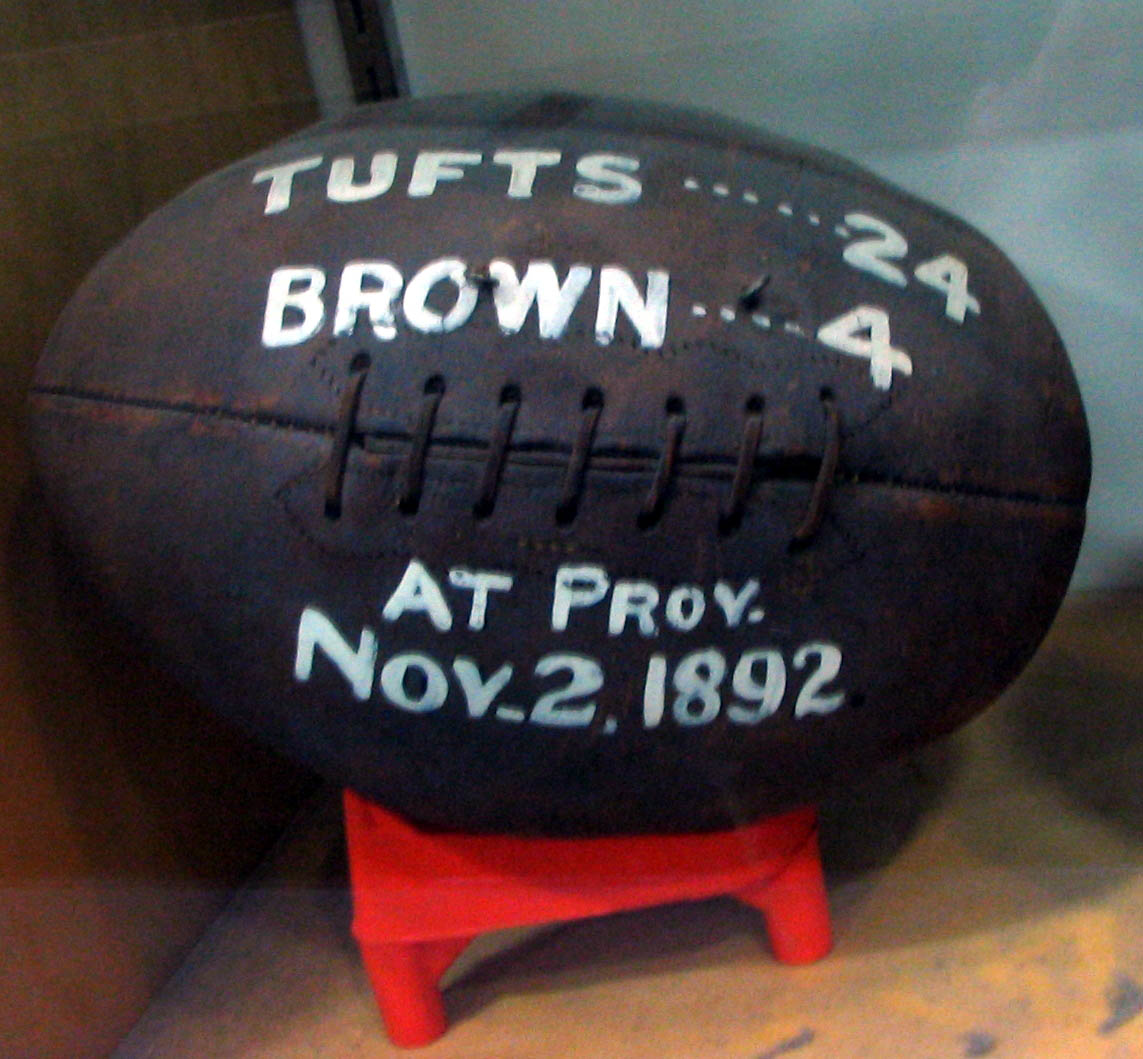
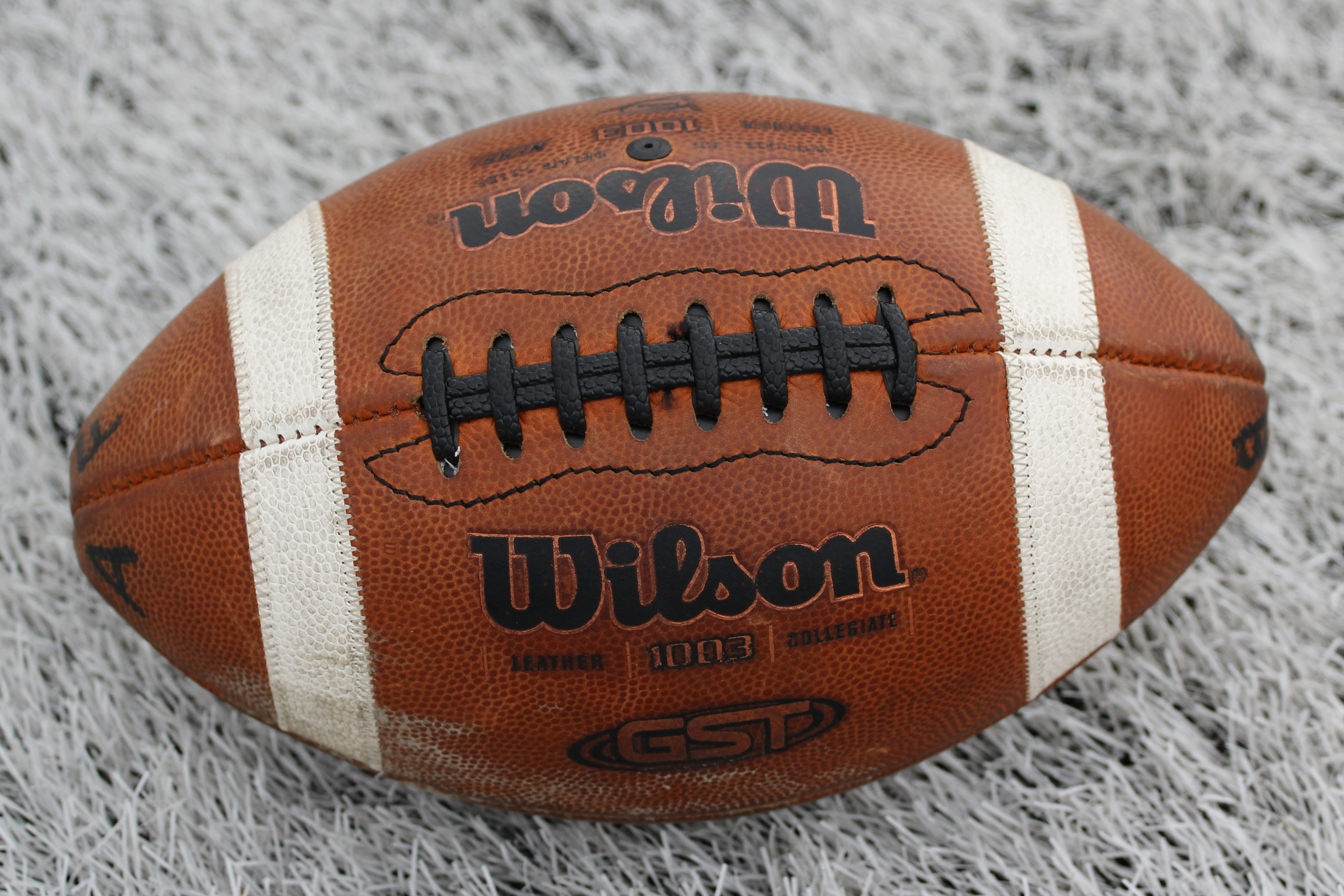
Changes in ball shape through the years: from a first egg-shaped in 1892, to a Wilson football in 2012

Specification of the size of the ball for the American game came in 1912. Increased use of the forward pass encouraged adoption of a narrower ball, starting with changes in the 1920s which enhanced rifled throwing and also spiral punting. This had the consequence of all but eliminating the drop kick from the American game.

== Rugby football ==
In the two codes of rugby (union and league), a forward pass is against the rules. Normally this results in a scrum to the opposing team, but on rare occasions a penalty may be awarded if the referee is of the belief that the ball was deliberately thrown forward.

Unlike in gridiron football, where the direction of a pass is judged strictly relative to the ground, in both codes of rugby the direction of the pass is relative to the player making the pass and not to the actual path relative to the ground. A forward pass occurs when the player passes the ball forward in relation to himself. (This applies only to the movement of the player, not to the direction in which the passer is facing, i.e. if the player is facing backwards and passes toward their team's goal area, it is not forward; and conversely, if the player passes toward the opponent's goal area, it is forward.) In rugby league, the video referee may not make judgements on whether a pass is forward.

The garryowen, as well as the cross-field kick, while not as reliable as the forward pass and more difficult to execute successfully, can provide some of the function that a forward pass does in American and Canadian football.

== Other football codes ==
In some other football codes, such as association football (soccer), Australian rules football and Gaelic football, the kicked forward pass is used so ubiquitously that it is not thought of as a distinct kind of play at all. In association football and its variants, the concept of offside is used to regulate who can be in front of the play or be nearest to the goal. Historically some earlier incarnations of football allowed unlimited forward passing, and present-day Australian rules football and Gaelic football do not have an offside rule. Austus was a variation of Australian rules football created in Australia during World War II and played between Australians and visiting soldiers from the United States using a gridiron ball with rules that allowed throwing the ball to create a fair contest between teams of both nations.

== See also ==
- Glossary of American football
- History of American football
- Lateral pass
- Rugby league gameplay
- Rugby union gameplay
- Hail Mary pass
- Snap
- List of National Football League records (individual) #Passing touchdowns
- National Football League passing touchdowns leaders (disambiguation)
- Most consecutive games with a touchdown pass (NFL)
