= Spiral (disambiguation) =

A spiral is a curve which emanates from a central point, getting progressively further away as it revolves around the point.

Spiral may also refer to:

== Science, mathematics and art ==
- Spiral galaxy, a type of galaxy in astronomy
- Spiral Dynamics, a theory of human development
- Spiral cleavage, a type of cleavage in embryonic development
- Victoria and Albert Museum Spiral, a proposed (abandoned in 2004) controversial extension to the museum
- Spiral (arts alliance), an African-American art collective
- Spiral (publisher), a New Zealand women's publisher and art collective
- Spiral model, a software development process
- On Spirals, by Archimedes

== Transport ==
- Spiral (railway), a technique employed by railways to ascend steep hills
- Spiral bridge, a similar technique for roads
- 9K114 Shturm, an anti-tank missile that is known under the NATO reporting name as AT-6 Spiral
- Mikoyan-Gurevich MiG-105 Spiral, a Soviet spaceplane
- Spiral dive, a type of generally undesirable and accidental descent manoeuvre in an aircraft

== Film and television ==
- Spiral (1978 film), a Polish film
- Spiral (1998 film), a Japanese film
- Uzumaki (film), or Spiral, a 2000 Japanese film
- Spiral (2007 film), an American film
- Spiral (2014 film), a Russian film
- Spiral (2019 film), a Canadian film
- Spiral (2021 film), an American film, part of the Saw horror franchise
- The Spiral (film), a 2026 Italian film
- Spiral (TV series), English title of French thriller series Engrenages
- Spiral: The Bonds of Reasoning, a 2002 Japanese anime series
- "Spiral" (Buffy the Vampire Slayer), a 2001 TV series episode
- "Spiral", 2010 television series episode of Haven (season 1)
- "Spiral", 2015 episode of NCIS: Los Angeles (season 6)
- Glen Coroner, a.k.a. Spiral, 2006 contestant in the UK Big Brother TV show
- Spiral, a character from the television series Pac-Man and the Ghostly Adventures

== Books and comics ==
- Spiral (Suzuki novel), a 1995 Japanese book in the Ring series
- Spiral (character), comic book character
- Spiral: The Bonds of Reasoning, a 2002 mystery anime and manga series
- Spiral (Tunnels novel), 2011/12 novel by Roderick Gordon
- Spiralis/Spiril, the Bokmål/Danish name for the Marsupilami
- Uzumaki, a 1998 horror manga series

== Music ==
- Spiraling (band)

=== Albums ===
- Spiral (Allison Crowe album), 2010
- Spiral (Andrew Hill album), 1975
- Spiral (Bobby Hutcherson album), 1979
- Spiral (Brooke Candy album), 2024
- Spiral (Darkside album), 2021
- Spiral (Hiromi album), 2006
- Spiral (Kenny Barron album), 1982
- Spiral (Rezz album), 2021
- Spiral (Vangelis album), 1977
- Spirals (album), by Blood Has Been Shed, 2003

=== Songs and pieces ===
- Spiral (Norman), a 2018 orchestral composition by Andrew Norman
- Spiral (Stockhausen), a 1968 process-music composition by Karlheinz Stockhausen
- "Spiral" (Arne Bendiksen song), the Norwegian Eurovision Song Contest 1964 entry by Arne Joachim Bendiksen
- "Spiral" (Paul McCartney song), from Working Classical, 1999
- "Spiral" (Pendulum song), a 2003 song by Australian drum and bass group Pendulum
- "Spiralling" (song), a 2008 song by Keane
- Spiral, track four from John Coltrane's Giant Steps
- "Spiral", track five from William Orbit's Hello Waveforms
- "Spiral", a song by Godsmack from Awake
- "Spiral", a single by 21 Savage for the 2021 movie Spiral
- The Spiral, the official fan organization of Nine Inch Nails

== Other ==
- Spiral (bobsleigh, luge, and skeleton), a track near Nagano City, Japan used for the 1998 Winter Olympics
- Spiral approach, a teaching technique
- Spiral dance, a neo-pagan dance
- Figure skating spirals, an element in figure skating
- Spiral staircase, a type of stairway characterized by its spiral shape
- SPIRAL: Selected Patient Information in Asian Languages
- Spiral (dinghy), a type or class of sailing dinghy
- Spiral (piercing), a thick spiral that is usually worn through the ear lobe
- Spiral (building) in Tokyo
- The Spiral (New York City), a New York City skyscraper designed by Bjarke Ingels Group
- Spiral (football)

== See also ==
- Helix (disambiguation)
