= List of gridiron football quarterbacks passing statistics =

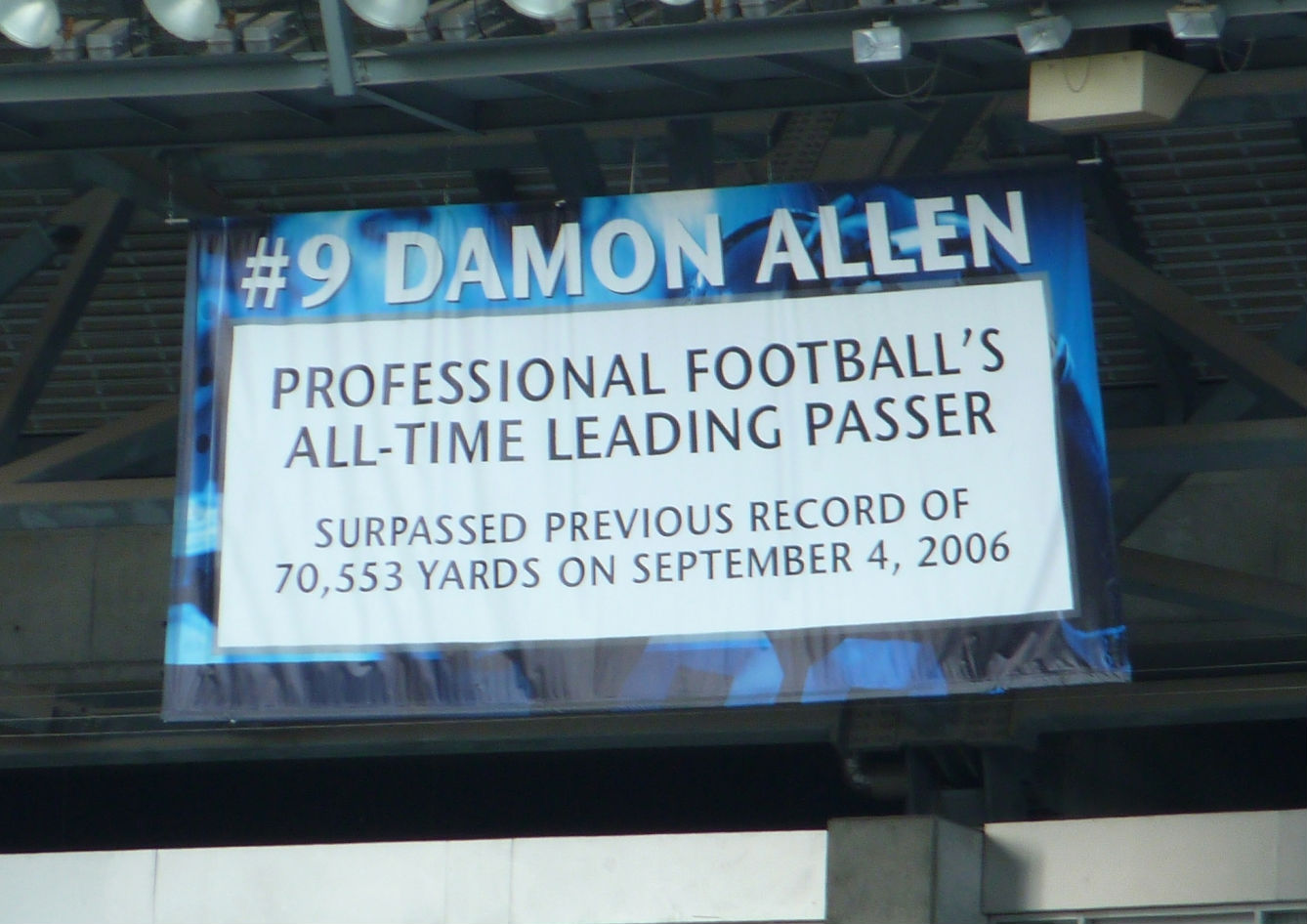
A banner hangs in the Rogers Centre to commemorate Damon Allen's record-breaking pass in 2006.

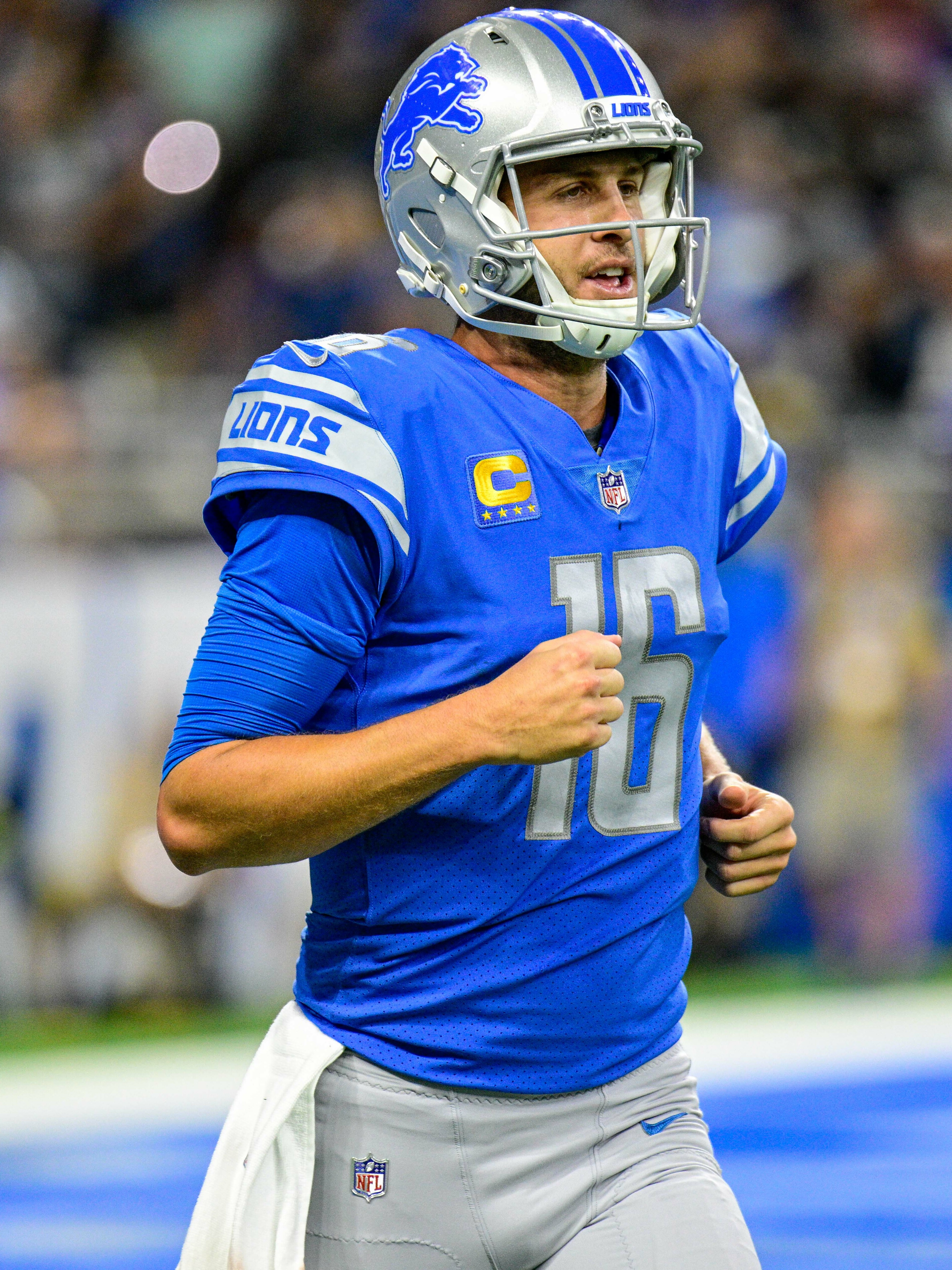
Jared Goff is the newest player added.

This is a list of gridiron football quarterbacks passing statistics for quarterbacks that have played outdoor professional football in North America. Below is a listing of the combined professional football league leaders for passing yards, passing touchdowns, passing completions, and passing attempts.

Because indoor football is played on a much shorter field and heavily favors offensive scoring, its records are not included in the main list, but are noted in a separate addendum below; likewise, as is standard for statistical record-keeping, exhibition games, all-star games (such as the Pro Bowl) and preseason contests are not counted.

During the 2021 NFL season, Tampa Bay Buccaneers quarterback Tom Brady passed Drew Brees to become the all-time passing yards leader in professional football league history. Brees had surpassed Anthony Calvillo for the record in the previous season, while Calvillo had surpassed Damon Allen for the record in the 2011 CFL season. Allen broke the previous record held by Warren Moon in 2006. Moon had held the record since 1992, when he surpassed the record set by Ron Lancaster, who had surpassed Johnny Unitas during the 1975 CFL season. Unitas established the record set forth in this listing, while Aaron Rodgers is the leading active QB chasing Brady.

In the 2020 NFL season, Brady surpassed Brees for the all-time passing touchdowns record; Brees had surpassed Peyton Manning for the record the season before. Manning had held the record since the 2014 NFL season when he surpassed Brett Favre's record. Prior to that, Brett Favre held the record since the 2007 NFL season when he surpassed Warren Moon's record. Moon had held the record since 1994 when he surpassed the record set by Fran Tarkenton. Tarkenton had surpassed Johnny Unitas during the 1975 NFL season. Ron Lancaster overtook Tarkenton's lead in the touchdown pass category during the 1977 CFL season. However, Tarkenton retook the lead during the 1978 NFL season. Unitas established the record set forth in this listing.

Brady has held the record for pass completions since passing Brees during the 2021 NFL season; Brees surpassed Brett Favre during the 2018 season. Favre had held the previous record since the 2007 season when he surpassed Warren Moon's record. Moon had held the record since 1992 when he surpassed the record set by Fran Tarkenton. Tarkenton had surpassed Johnny Unitas during the 1975 NFL season. Unitas established the record set forth in this listing.

Brady has held the record for pass completions since passing Brees during the 2021 NFL season; Brees surpassed Brett Favre during the 2018 season. Favre had held the previous record since the 2007 season when he surpassed Warren Moon's record. Moon had held the record since 1992 when he surpassed the record set by Fran Tarkenton. Tarkenton had surpassed Johnny Unitas during the 1975 NFL season. Unitas established the record set forth in this listing.

Brady has held the record for pass attempts since the 2020 NFL season when he surpassed Brees, who had surpassed Favre earlier in the same season. Prior to being surpassed by both Brady and Brees during the 2020 NFL season, Favre had held the record since 2008, when he surpassed Warren Moon. Moon had held the record since 1993 when he surpassed the record set by Fran Tarkenton. Tarkenton had surpassed Johnny Unitas during the 1975 NFL season. Unitas established the record set forth in this listing.

Brady, Moon, and Unitas are the only gridiron quarterbacks to have held the record in all four of the major passing categories (passing yards, passing touchdowns, pass completions, and pass attempts) at the same time. Brees held each of the four records at one point during his career, but never held all four of them at the same time.

Other categories from this listing that provides all-time leaders include Rodgers, who is pro football's all-time passer rating leader, and Ron Lancaster, the all-time interceptions leader.

If regular season and post-season combined records are considered, Brady is the all-time leader in gridiron passing yards with 102,614, having broken Calvillo's record of 85,976 yards in 2020.

Brady is also the leader in the other three major categories if post-season performances are considered (with 737 touchdown passes, 8,953 pass completions and 13,971 pass attempts).

== All-time outdoor professional quarterback passing statistics ==
Updated through current season; minimum 40,000 passing yards.
Bold and highlight denotes an active player.

| Rank | Name | Tenure | Leagues | Attempts | Completions | Comp % | TDs | INTs | Yardage | Passer rating | References |
|---|---|---|---|---|---|---|---|---|---|---|---|
| 1 | Tom Brady | 2000–2022 | NFL | 12,050^{*} | 7,753^{*} | 64.3 | 649^{*} | 212 | 89,214^{*} | 97.2 | |
| 2 | Drew Brees | 2001–2020 | NFL | 10,551^{~} | 7,142^{~} | 67.7 | 571^{~} | 243 | 80,358^{~} | 98.7 | |
| 3 | Anthony Calvillo | 1994–2013 | CFL | 9,437 | 5,892 | 62.4 | 455 | 224 | 79,816^{~} | 95.5 | |
| 4 | Damon Allen | 1985–2007 | CFL | 9,138 | 5,158 | 56.5 | 394 | 278 | 72,381^{~} | 83.8 | |
| 5 | Peyton Manning | 1998–2015 | NFL | 9,380 | 6,125 | 65.3 | 539^{~} | 251 | 71,940 | 96.5 | |
| 6 | Brett Favre | 1991–2010 | NFL | 10,169^{~} | 6,300^{~} | 62.0 | 508^{~} | 336 | 71,838 | 86.0 | |
| 7 | Warren Moon | 1977–2000 | NFL/CFL | 9,205^{~} | 5,357^{~} | 58.2 | 435^{~} | 310 | 70,553^{~} | 84.2 | |
| 8 | Aaron Rodgers | Since 2005 | NFL | 9,060 | 5,886 | 65.0 | 542 | 129 | 68,288 | 101.6 | |
| 9 | Matthew Stafford | Since 2009 | NFL | 9,135 | 5,810 | 63.6 | 442 | 206 | 67,139 | 92.4 | |
| 10 | Ben Roethlisberger | 2004–2021 | NFL | 8,433 | 5,440 | 64.4 | 418 | 211 | 64,088 | 93.5 | |
| 11 | Henry Burris | 1997–2016 | CFL/NFL/NFLE | 7,576 | 4,711 | 62.2 | 382 | 237 | 64,023 | 92.9 | |
| 12 | Philip Rivers | 2004–2020, 2025 | NFL | 8,226 | 5,335 | 64.9 | 425 | 212 | 63,984 | 95.0 | |
| 13 | Matt Ryan | 2008–2022 | NFL | 8,464 | 5,551 | 65.6 | 381 | 183 | 62,792 | 93.6 | |
| 14 | Dan Marino | 1983–1999 | NFL | 8,358 | 4,967 | 59.4 | 420 | 252 | 61,361 | 86.4 | |
| 15 | Ricky Ray | 2002–2018 | CFL | 7,301 | 4,976 | 68.2^{~} | 324 | 177 | 60,736 | 98.4^{~} | |
| 16 | Doug Flutie | 1985–2005 | CFL/NFL/USFL | 7,276 | 4,286 | 58.9 | 369 | 237 | 58,179 | 87.8 | |
| 17 | Eli Manning | 2004–2019 | NFL | 8,119 | 4,894 | 60.3 | 366 | 244 | 57,023 | 84.1 | |
| 18 | Danny McManus | 1988–2006 | CFL/NFL | 6,689 | 3,640 | 54.4 | 259 | 281 | 53,255 | 76.1 | |
| 19 | Kevin Glenn | 2001–2018 | CFL | 6,434 | 4,068 | 63.2 | 294 | 207 | 52,867 | 90.8 | |
| 20 | John Elway | 1983–1999 | NFL | 7,250 | 4,123 | 56.9 | 300 | 226 | 51,475 | 79.9 | |
| 21 | Ron Lancaster | 1960–1978 | CFL | 6,233 | 3,384 | 54.3 | 333^{~} | 396^{*} | 50,535^{~} | 72.4 | |
| 22 | Joe Flacco | Since 2008 | NFL | 7,167 | 4,417 | 61.6 | 272 | 172 | 48,176 | 84.1 | |
| 23 | Kirk Cousins | Since 2012 | NFL | 6,245 | 4,157 | 66.6 | 320 | 140 | 47,247 | 96.8 | |
| 24 | Fran Tarkenton | 1961–1978 | NFL | 6,467^{~} | 3,686^{~} | 57.0 | 342^{~} | 266 | 47,003 | 80.4 | |
| 25 | Russell Wilson | 2012–2025 | NFL | 6,120 | 3,951 | 64.6 | 353 | 114 | 46,966 | 99.3 | |
| 26 | Carson Palmer | 2003–2017 | NFL | 6,307 | 3,941 | 62.5 | 294 | 187 | 46,247 | 87.9 | |
| 27 | Vinny Testaverde | 1987–2007 | NFL | 6,701 | 3,787 | 56.5 | 275 | 267 | 46,233 | 75.0 | |
| 28 | Bo Levi Mitchell | Since 2012 | CFL | 5,348 | 3,508 | 65.6 | 271 | 129 | 45,426 | 99.0 | |
| 29 | Jim Kelly | 1984–1996 | NFL/USFL | 5,933 | 3,604 | 60.7 | 320 | 195 | 45,309 | 88.8 | |
| 30 | Drew Bledsoe | 1993–2006 | NFL | 6,717 | 3,839 | 57.2 | 250 | 115 | 44,611 | 77.1 | |
| 31 | Matt Dunigan | 1983–1996 | CFL | 5,476 | 3,057 | 55.8 | 306 | 211 | 43,857 | 84.6 | |
| 32 | Jeff Garcia | 1994–2011 | CFL/NFL/UFL | 5,955 | 3,645 | 61.2 | 272 | 146 | 43,300 | 88.9 | |
| 33 | Trevor Harris | Since 2012 | CFL | 4,974 | 3,528 | 70.9^{*} | 236 | 110 | 43,067 | 103.9^{*} | |
| 34 | Dan Fouts | 1973–1987 | NFL | 5,604 | 3,297 | 58.8 | 254 | 242 | 43,040 | 80.2 | |
| 35 | Jared Goff | Since 2016 | NFL | 5,528 | 3,645 | 65.9 | 274 | 106 | 42,059 | 97.3 | |
| 36 | Derek Carr | 2014–2024 | NFL | 5,785 | 3,765 | 65.1 | 257 | 112 | 41,245 | 92.8 | |
| 37 | Kerry Collins | 1995–2011 | NFL | 6,261 | 3,487 | 55.7 | 208 | 196 | 40,922 | 73.8 | |
| 38 | Joe Montana | 1979–1994 | NFL | 5,391 | 3,409 | 63.2 | 273 | 139 | 40,551 | 92.3 | |
| 39 | Tracy Ham | 1987–1999 | CFL | 4,945 | 2,670 | 54.0 | 284 | 164 | 40,534 | 86.6 | |
| 40 | Johnny Unitas | 1956–1973 | NFL | 5,186 | 2,830 | 54.6 | 290 | 253 | 40,239 | 78.2 | |

^* = Leader in category for outdoor gridiron football. ^~ = Former leader in category for outdoor gridiron football.

== North American outdoor gridiron football leagues ==
The following leagues are eligible for inclusion for statistical purposes:

- National Football League (NFL), since 1920
- Canadian Football League (CFL) and predecessors, 1929–2019, 2021–¹
- Liga de Fútbol Americano Profesional (LFA), 2016–2019, 2022–
- UFL and its component XFL and USFL conferences, 2020, 2022–²

The following former leagues include statistics for players who attained the minimum 40,000 passing yards:

- United States Football League (USFL), 1983–1985, 2022–2023
- NFL Europe (NFLE), 1991–1992; 1995–2007
- United Football League (UFL), 2009–2012
- Alliance of American Football (AAF), 2019²

Notes:

- ¹ The CFL's East Division has existed since 1907 but did not legalize the forward pass until 1929.
- ² To date, these leagues have not had any quarterbacks whose career statistics rank high enough to qualify for this list. Quarterbacks who played in these leagues are still active in professional football and thus, in theory, could appear on this list in the future.
- The inclusion of a league in this list does not imply major or minor league status. No players who played in the American Football League threw for 40,000 career yards, even as NFL and CFL quarterbacks from the same era achieved that feat.

== Addendum ==
For the purpose of this list, indoor American football statistics have been excluded. While overall passing yards are not substantially greater in a given indoor football game compared to a CFL or NFL contest, the number of touchdowns in that form of the sport is far higher, and a list including them would invariably favor indoor football quarterbacks in the number of touchdowns thrown. Quarterbacks who would qualify for this list in yardage statistics if indoor football statistics are included are listed here separately:

- Ricky Ray has 1,296 additional passing yards from his time with the Fresno Frenzy of AF2 which was a league of indoor gridiron football. These passing yards are not included in the totals above since this list consists only outdoor gridiron football statistics and because AF2, the extinct minor league of the defunct Arena Football League, played at a semi-professional level. (Ray, though he was on the 53-man roster of the NFL's New York Jets in 2004, spent the entire season as the third-string quarterback and never took a snap or threw a pass during his time in the NFL.)
- Kurt Warner has 44,931 gridiron passing yards. However, this list consists only outdoor gridiron football. His outdoor gridiron football statistics from his time in the NFL (32,344 passing yards) and his time with the Amsterdam Admirals of NFL Europe (2,101 passing yards) totals 34,445 outdoor gridiron passing yards. He also passed for 10,486 yards as a member of the Iowa Barnstormers of the Arena Football League, which is played indoors.
- Aaron Garcia has 62,180 gridiron passing yards. However, all of his totals were accumulated in the now-defunct Arena Football League. Six other AFL players (Mark Grieb, Clint Dolezel, Andy Kelly, Sherdrick Bonner, John Dutton, Tommy Grady) have amassed over 40,000 gridiron football passing yards indoors (Grieb has an additional 499 yards for his play with the Scottish Claymores of NFL Europe and 408 yards for his play with the Las Vegas Outlaws of the original 2001 version of the XFL, while Kelly has additional yardage from his time with the Rhein Fire of NFL Europe, then known as the World League. Dutton reached 40,000 combined with his one year in the Indoor Football League. Grady completed his milestone during his time in the National Arena League.).

== See also ==
- List of National Football League passing yardage leaders
- National Football League passing touchdowns leaders (disambiguation)
- List of National Football League passing completions leaders
- List of National Football League records (individual)
- List of Canadian Football League records (individual)
- List of leagues of American and Canadian football
