= David J. Schlegel =

American astronomer

David Schlegel
- Born: 1967 (age 58–59)
- Education: University of California, Berkeley (PhD)
- Known for: galaxy surveys, interstellar dust, DESI
- Awards: Lawrence Award
- Scientific career
- Fields: cosmology, astronomy
- Workplaces: Lawrence Berkeley National Laboratory, Berkeley
- Doctoral advisor: Marc Davis

David James Schlegel (born 1967) is a Senior Scientist at the Lawrence Berkeley National Laboratory. He earned his PhD in 1995 from the University of California, Berkeley. His earliest research was with Prof. Marc Davis and Douglas Finkbeiner working on dust maps of the universe. This research resulted in one of the most highly cited articles in astronomy. These maps proved to be essential for removing foregrounds in subsequent imaging or cosmic microwave background surveys.

From 2008 to 2014 he was the principal investigator (PI) for the Baryon Oscillation Spectroscopic Survey (BOSS) project on the Sloan Telescope, at Apache Point, New Mexico. This project was part of the Sloan Digital Sky Survey and created a three-dimensional map of 1.5 million galaxies. These galaxy maps are used to study the expansion of the Universe and the effects of dark matter and dark energy. The BOSS project measured the size scale of the Universe to 1% precision. Currently, Dr. Schlegel is the co-PI of the DECam Legacy Survey (DECals) (with Dr. Arjun Dey) sky survey. This 3-band sky survey, now completed, covers approximately 5,000 square degrees of the night sky, when combined with two other companion surveys the Legacy Survey expands to 16,000 square degrees containing 1.6 billion objects including galaxies and quasars out to 11 billion years ago. Most recently, Dr. Schlegel is project scientist for the Dark Energy Spectroscopic Instrument (DESI). DESI will construct a three-dimensional map of tens of millions of galaxies spanning the local universe to 11 billion light years.

In 2010, Secretary of Energy Ernest Moniz awarded Schlegel the Lawrence Award for excellence in scientific, technical, or engineering achievements related to the mission of the U.S. Department of Energy.
