= Helix (disambiguation) =

A helix is a three-dimensional curve that maintains a constant radius while winding around a central axis with a uniform or varying pitch.

Helix may also refer to:

== Arts, entertainment, and media ==
- Helix (roller coaster), a roller coaster at Liseberg in Gothenburg, Sweden
- Helix, a brand for TV services offered by Vidéotron

=== Print ===
- The Helix (magazine), an Australian teen science bimonthly
- Helix (newspaper), a 1960s Seattle underground newspaper
- Helix (comics), a 1996-1998 DC comics imprint
- Helix (Marvel Comics), a superhero
- Helix SF, an online magazine
- Helix, a 2007 novel by Eric Brown
- Helix, a team of super-villains in the comics series Infinity Inc.

=== Film, television, and video games ===
- Helix Studios, American gay pornographic film studio founded in 2002
- Helix (film) or Innocent, a 2009 American film directed by Aram Rappaport
- Helix (TV series), an American science fiction series 2014–2015
- Project Helix, working name of the successor to the Xbox Series X
- Helix (video game), a 2008 video game
- Helix, a character in the 2017 video game Arms

=== Music ===
- Helix (band), a Canadian hard rock band
- Helix (Amaranthe album), 2018
- Helix (Crystal Lake album)
- Helix (composition), a 2005 orchestral piece by Esa-Pekka Salonen
- "Helix", a song by DJ Flume from Skin
- "Helix", a song by Justice from Audio, Video, Disco

== Biology ==
- Helix (ear), the prominent rim of the auricle
- Helix (gastropod), a genus of snails

== Computing ==
- Helix (cipher) published in 2003
- Helix (database), database management system for the Apple Macintosh platform, created in 1983
- Helix (multimedia project), a project to produce computer software that can play audio and video media in various formats, aid in producing such media, and serve them over a network
- Helix, a market payment service with an integrated bitcoin tumbler by the darknet-market search engine Grams.
- Helix ALM, formerly called TestTrack, software for managing requirements, defects, issues and testing throughout the software development cycle developed by Seapine Software
- Helix (robot), a humanoid robot developed by Figure AI

== Enterprises ==
- Helix (genomics company), a U.S.-based population genomics company
- Helix (stationery company), a UK scholastic stationery manufacturer
- Helix Energy Solutions Group
- Helix Software Company, a former US-based system and utility software company founded in 1986
- Helix High School, La Mesa, California, a charter high school
- The Helix (Falkirk), a regeneration project in Scotland

== Locations ==
- The Helix Bridge, officially The Helix, a pedestrian bridge linking Marina Centre with Marina South in the Marina Bay area in Singapore
- Lincoln Tunnel Helix, part of New Jersey Route 495
  - See also Spiral bridge
- The Helix, Dublin, a concert hall and performance space on the Dublin City University
- Helix Nebula, a large planetary nebula (PN) located in the constellation Aquarius in outer space
- HELIX (New Brunswick, New Jersey)

== Transportation ==
- Honda Helix, a scooter
- Kamov Ka-27, a helicopter, NATO reporting name Helix

== Other ==
- Helix (mythology)
- Ambassador Helix, a character in Pixar's Elio

== See also ==
- Spiral (disambiguation)
