= Alison Coil =

American astrophysicist

- Education: Princeton University; Harvard University; University of California, Berkeley; University of Arizona
- Scientific career
- Fields: Astrophysics

Alison Laurel Coil is an American astrophysicist whose research studies the evolution of galaxies, including active galactic nuclei, gas flow into and out of galaxies and its effects on star formation, and the effects on galaxies of the structure of the universe. Her research has also uncovered connections between radio-frequency emissions from circular structures surrounding galaxies, shocked gasses near the galactic centers, and galactic starbursts, and she has also published about gender bias in science. She is the inaugural chair of the Department of Astronomy and Astrophysics at the University of California, San Diego.

== Education and career ==
Coil was an undergraduate at Princeton University, studying both philosophy and astrophysics there. Forced to make a choice between the two, after a year of astronomy research at Harvard University, she chose astrophysics, and continued her graduate studies at the University of California, Berkeley, including doctoral research studying galaxies and the early universe with the W. M. Keck Observatory. Her dissertation, The middle-aged universe: Results from high-z supernovae and the DEEP2 Galaxy Redshift Survey, was supervised by Marc Davis.

After postdoctoral research at the University of Arizona, she became a faculty member at the University of California, San Diego in 2008. She became dean for equity, diversity, and inclusion in the university's School of Physical Sciences in 2018. When the university formed a new Department of Astronomy and Astrophysics in 2023, she became its inaugural chair.

== Recognition ==
In 2025, Coil was named as a Fellow of the American Astronomical Society, "for original and creative contributions to our understanding of the evolution of galaxies and the formation and evolution of supermassive black holes; for uncovering the large-scale structure of galaxies in the distant universe; and for inspirational mentorship of the next generation of astrophysicists".
