= Coil (chemistry) =

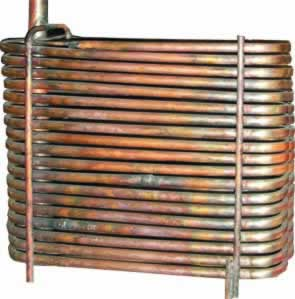
19-loop copper coil

A coil, in chemistry, is a tube, frequently in spiral form, used commonly to cool steam originating from a distillation and thus to condense it in liquid form. Usually it is of copper or another material that conducts heat easily. However copper is mostly used as a material, when a higher hardness is required it is combined with other elements to make an alloy such as brass or bronze.
Coils are often used in chemical processes in batch reaction or mixing tank as internal source of heat transfer.
