= Selected Patient Information Resources in Asian Languages =

Web resource by Tufts University

Selected Patient Information Resources in Asian Languages (SPIRAL) was a web resource that connects people to authoritative health information in Asian languages that was freely available online. SPIRAL was maintained by the Tufts University Hirsh Health Sciences Library and funded by grant from the New England Region of the National Network of Libraries of Medicine.

== History ==
SPIRAL began as a collaborative endeavor between the South Cove Community Health Center, New England’s premier primary and preventative health center for Asian Americans, and the Tufts University Hirsh Health Sciences Library. Long-time neighbors in the Chinatown section of Boston, the Tufts University Hirsh Health Sciences Library and South Cove Community Health Center entered into a collaborative partnership in 2001 to address a growing need for Asian language health information in the Boston-area. According to United States Census data, the Asian American population in the U.S. as a whole grew 72% between 1990 and 2000.

Librarians at the Tufts University Hirsh Health Sciences Library were responsible for locating authoritative information on these languages. Methods employed to locate authoritative information include utilized popular web search engines, soliciting recommendations from health provider and consumer health professionals working with Asian-language speaking populations, and consulting consumer health resources focusing on multicultural health and cultural competency (e.g., journals, listservs). Resources were considered for inclusion on the SPIRAL web site if they have English-language versions of documents available for comparison and were created by authoritative sources. Information sources were classified as authoritative if they were :

- Government agencies, both U.S. and international (U.S. Centers for Disease Control and Prevention; National Health Service, UK)
- Universities (Georgia State University; NYU Center for Child Study)
- Hospitals (Harborview Medical Center in Seattle, WA)
- Premier non-profit health agencies (American Cancer Society; Royal College of Psychiatrists, UK)
- Multi-lingual health specialists who have recommended or submitted information for inclusion

Selected resources were organized on the SPIRAL web site by health topic and by language. Qualified, volunteer translators have reproduced the SPIRAL web site and related materials into the target languages to allow native speakers to navigate the site more easily.

In 2017, the SPIRAL website was discontinued.

== Distinctions ==
SPIRAL has received the following distinctions:

- Listed one of fifty “Internet sites of interest” for diabetes information in the June 2008 issue of Chartered Institute of Library and Information Professionals (CILIP) Health Libraries Group Newsletter.
- Featured as a Tufts University web site profile, "Found in Translation"
- Participant, the Medical Library Association 2006 Annual Meeting symposium “Serving Diverse Users: Cultural Competencies for Health Sciences Librarians” held in Phoenix, AZ, May 19–24, 2006.
- Presented as a poster, "SPIRAL: Selected Patient Information Resources in Asian Languages," at the National Leadership Summit on Eliminating Racial and Ethnic Disparities in Health, sponsored by the United States Department of Health and Human Services Office on Disability in partnership with the Office on Women's Health and the Office of Minority Health - Washington, D.C., January 9–11, 2006.
- Presented as a poster, "SPIRAL: Selected Patient Information Resources in Asian Languages," at the Medical Library Association 2005 Annual Meeting poster session held in San Antonio, TX, May 14–19, 2005.
- Featured in the Boston Globe article, "The Export Of Boston Science and Medicine"
