= Spiral (football) =

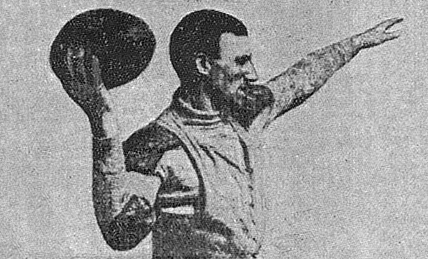
Bradbury Robinson, who threw the first legal forward pass, demonstrates an "Overhand spiral—fingers on lacing"

In gridiron football, a spiral is the continuous in-flight rotation around the longitudinal axis of a football following its release from the hand of a passer or foot of a punter.

== History ==
Pop Warner is credited for teaching his players both the spiral punt and the spiral pass.

=== Pass ===
The development of the forward pass is traced to Eddie Cochems and Bradbury Robinson at St. Louis. Howard R. Reiter also claimed to develop the overhand forward pass.

=== Punt ===
Alex Moffat invented the spiral punt, described by one writer as "a dramatic change from the traditional end-over-end kicks." He also invented the drop kick.

== See also ==
- Spiral
- Torpedo punt
- Forward pass
