= NFL passing touchdowns leaders =

NFL passing touchdowns leaders may refer to:

- List of NFL annual passing touchdowns leaders
- List of NFL career passing touchdowns leaders
