= Julien Lesgourgues =

Cosmologist

- Born: 1972 (age 53–54); Bayonne, France
- Education: University of Tours (PhD)
- Known for: Cosmic microwave background; Large-scale structure of the universe; Cosmic neutrino background; Planck; Euclid; CLASS; Hubble tension
- Awards: CNRS Bronze Medal (2006); Gruber Cosmology Prize (2018) (shared)
- Scientific career
- Fields: Cosmology, Theoretical physics
- Workplaces: University of Tours; SISSA; LAPTh; CERN; EPFL; RWTH Aachen University
- Thesis: Inflationary models and CMB anisotropies (1998)
- Doctoral advisor: David Polarski

Julien Lesgourgues (born 1972) is a cosmologist and theoretical physicist. He is a professor in theoretical physics at the Institute for Theoretical Particle Physics and Cosmology (TTK) at RWTH Aachen University. He is known for his work on the cosmic microwave background (CMB), the large-scale structure (LSS) of the Universe and the properties of neutrinos. During his career, he has been part of the Planck and Euclid collaborations. He is the main author of CLASS (Cosmic Linear Anisotropy Solving System), one of the two currently most used Einstein-Boltzmann solvers, a type of software package used for computing CMB and LSS observables. He is currently a PI of a project funded by the European Research Council (ERC) dedicated to solving the Hubble tension of modern cosmology.

== Early life and education ==
Lesgourgues was born in 1972 in Bayonne, in the French Basque Country. He received an engineering degree from the École Polytechnique in Paris in 1994 and a doctorate in theoretical physics from the University of Tours in 1998.

== Career and research ==
Lesgourgues held postdoctoral positions in SISSA (Trieste) and at CERN (Geneva), and in 2000 became a permanent researcher of the French National Centre for Scientific Research (CNRS) at LAPTh, the theoretical physics laboratory in Annecy-le-Vieux. Between 2008 and 2015, he was on leave from the CNRS, with a position in the theory division at CERN and at the École Polytechnique Fédérale de Lausanne (EPFL). In 2015, he joined RWTH Aachen University as a full professor.

In 2011, Lesgourgues released the C-based Einstein-Boltzmann solver CLASS for the computation of the evolution of cosmological perturbations. This code is able to predict theoretical observables at background and perturbation levels, such as the CMB anisotropy spectra and the matter power spectrum. The project was developed as an independent code to compute cosmological predictions, providing a cross-check against the existing CAMB code. Lesgourgues also helped develop MontePython: a Markov Chain Monte Carlo code for cosmological parameter inference.

A large part of Lesgourgues's work concerns the implications of neutrino physics for cosmological observations. He contributed to examining the consequences of the Planck measurements and co-wrote the textbook Neutrino Cosmology. Lesgourgues is also an active member of large cosmological collaborations, such as the Planck and Euclid collaborations.

In November 2025, the European Research Council selected RedH0T ("Red teaming the H0 Tension") for a Synergy Grant aimed at addressing the Hubble tension: the persistent discrepancy between values of the Hubble constant using different cosmological datasets. The project aims to re-analyse measurements of the Hubble parameter using independent teams, to establish whether the tension is caused by measurement systematics or by new physics not included in the standard cosmological model. Lesgourgues' co-investigators are Adam Riess, Licia Verde and Frédéric Courbin. Lesgourgues is responsible for the CMB analyses and for the comparison of cosmological models.

As of July 2026 Lesgourgues has an h-index of 114 on Google Scholar.

== Service and outreach ==
Lesgourgues is a member of the editorial board of the Journal of Cosmology and Astroparticle Physics. He was chair of the organising committee at the COSMO19 conference, held at RWTH Aachen University in September 2019. In 2014, he gave a talk at TEDxCERN, "Taking the Fingerprints of the Universe", on the composition of the universe.

== Honours and awards ==
Lesgourgues received the CNRS Bronze Medal in 2006 and a teaching prize of the RWTH Aachen physics department in 2017. As a member of the Planck team, he is a co-holder of the 2018 Gruber Cosmology Prize, which was awarded to the collaboration as a whole, together with the instrument principal investigators Jean-Loup Puget and Nazzareno Mandolesi, for mapping the temperature and polarization of the cosmic microwave background. In 2025, he and his three RedH0T co-investigators were selected for an ERC Synergy Grant.
