= François Bouchet =

French astronomer

François R. Bouchet (French: [fʁɑ̃swa buʃe]) is a French astronomer specializing in physical cosmology, including formation of large scale structures and cosmic background radiation. He serves as the Institut d'Astrophysique de Paris liaison for the Planck Mission Project.

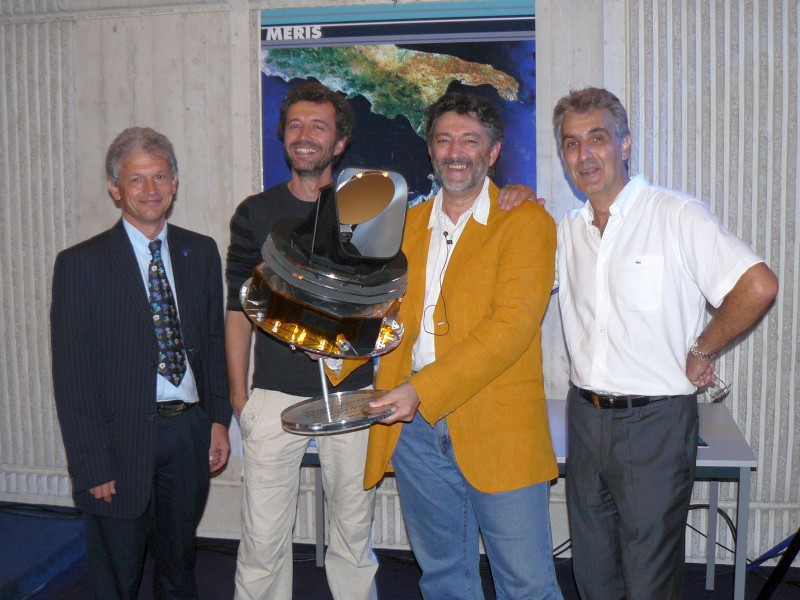
François Bouchet with Herschel Planck team (second from the right)

== Biography ==
François Bouchet is the son of gallery owner Nadine Musté and lawyer Paul Bouchet. Paul Bouchet's second wife was Mireille Delmas-Marty.

He graduated in 1980 as an engineer from the ESPCI Paris (95th class). He holds a doctorate in physics from Pierre and Marie Curie University, having defended his post-graduate thesis in 1983.

He has been a CNRS research director since 1993, and has been working at the Institut d'Astrophysique de Paris since January 1, 2021. He was a visiting astronomer in the United States, first at University of California, Berkeley and then at Princeton University.

== See also ==
- Eurasian Astronomical Society
