= Planck (spacecraft) =

ESA space observatory (2009-2013)

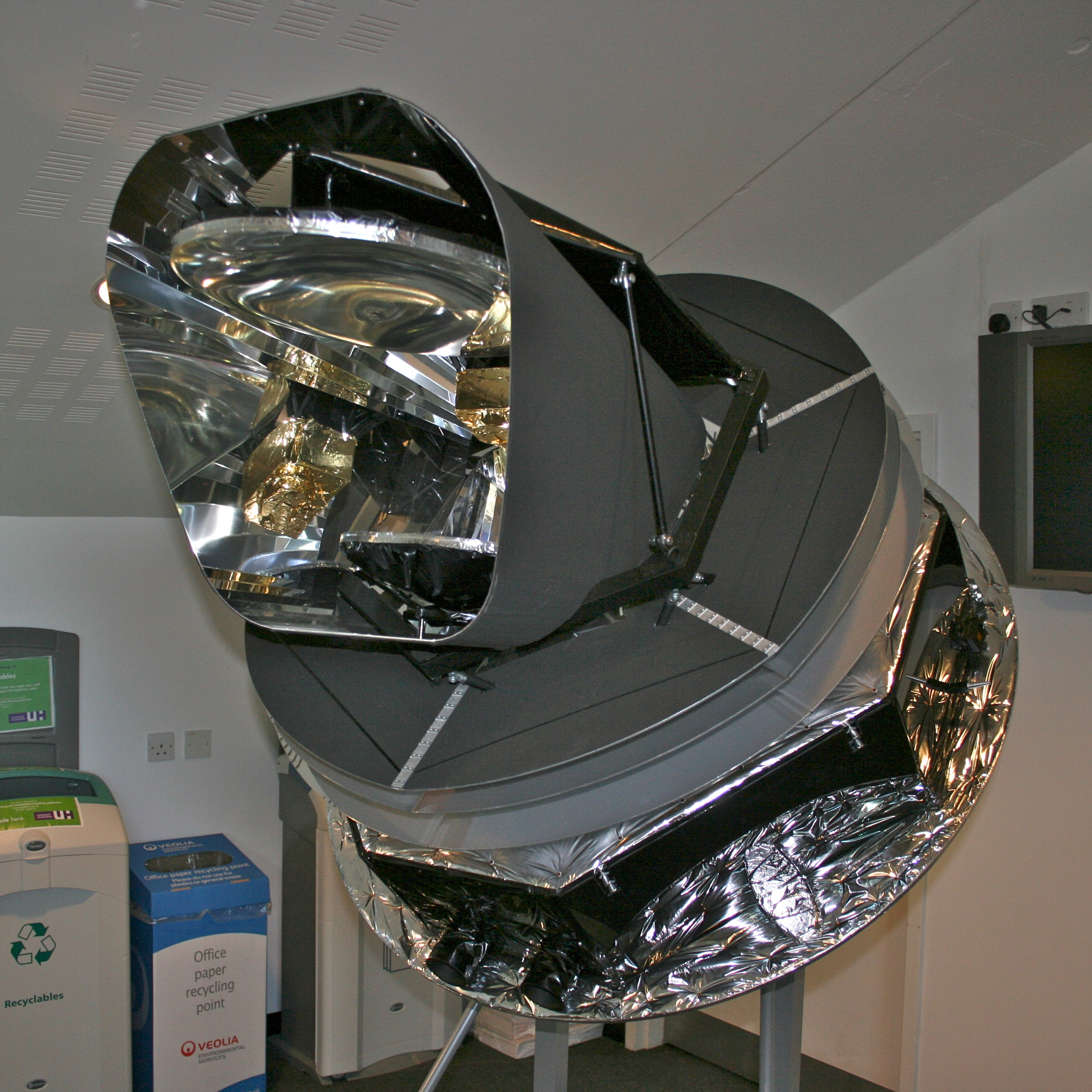
- A model of Planck
- Names: COBRAS/SAMBA
- Mission type: Space telescope
- Operator: ESA
- COSPAR ID: 2009-026B
- SATCAT no.: 34938
- Website: www.esa.int/planck
- Mission duration: Planned: >15 months Final: 4 years, 5 months, 8 days

Spacecraft properties
- Manufacturer: Thales Alenia Space
- Launch mass: 1,950 kg (4,300 lb)
- Payload mass: 205 kg (452 lb)
- Dimensions: Body: 4.20 m × 4.22 m (13.8 ft × 13.8 ft)

Start of mission
- Launch date: 14 May 2009, 13:12:02 UTC
- Rocket: Ariane 5 ECA
- Launch site: Guiana Space Centre, French Guiana
- Contractor: Arianespace
- Entered service: 3 July 2009

End of mission
- Disposal: Decommissioned
- Deactivated: 23 October 2013, 12:10:27 UTC

Orbital parameters
- Reference system: Sun-Earth L_{2} orbit (1,500,000 km / 930,000 mi)
- Regime: Lissajous

Main telescope
- Type: Gregorian
- Diameter: 1.9 m × 1.5 m (6.2 ft × 4.9 ft)
- Wavelengths: 300 μm – 11.1 mm (frequencies between 27 GHz and 1 THz)
Instruments
- HFI: High Frequency Instrument
- LFI: Low Frequency Instrument
- Contemporary ESA insignia (2000s) Horizon 2000 (Science Programme)

Planck was a space observatory operated by the European Space Agency (ESA) from 2009 to 2013. The project aimed to map the anisotropies of the cosmic microwave background (CMB) at microwave and infrared frequencies, with high sensitivity and angular resolution. The mission provided data that substantially improved upon previous observations made by the NASA Wilkinson Microwave Anisotropy Probe (WMAP).

The Planck observatory was a major source of information relevant to several cosmological and astrophysical issues. One of its key objectives was to test cosmological theories about the early Universe, its composition and evolution, and the origin of cosmic structure.

Planck was initially called COBRAS/SAMBA, which stands for the Cosmic Background Radiation Anisotropy Satellite/Satellite for Measurement of Background Anisotropies. The project started in 1996, and it was later renamed in honor of the German physicist Max Planck (1858–1947), who is widely regarded as the originator of quantum theory by deriving the formula for black-body radiation.

Built at the Cannes Mandelieu Space Center by Thales Alenia Space, Planck was created as a medium-sized mission for ESA's Horizon 2000 long-term scientific program. The observatory was launched in May 2009 and reached the Earth/Sun L2 point by July 2009. By February 2010, it had successfully started a second all-sky survey.

On 21 March 2013, the Planck team released its first all-sky map of the cosmic microwave background. The map allowed researchers to measure temperature variations in the CMB with the highest accuracy then available. In February 2015, an expanded release was published, which included polarization data. The final papers by the Planck team were released in July 2018, marking the end of the mission.

At the end of its mission, Planck was put into a heliocentric graveyard orbit and passivated to prevent it from endangering any future missions. The final deactivation command was sent to Planck in October 2013.

The mission provided the most precise measurements of several key cosmological parameters. Planck's observations helped determine the age of the universe, the average density of ordinary matter and dark matter in the Universe, and other important characteristics of the cosmos.

== Objectives ==
The mission had a wide variety of scientific aims, including:

- high resolution detections of both the total intensity and polarization of primordial CMB anisotropies,
- creation of a catalogue of galaxy clusters through the Sunyaev–Zel'dovich effect,
- observations of the gravitational lensing of the CMB, as well as the integrated Sachs–Wolfe effect,
- observations of bright extragalactic radio (active galactic nuclei) and infrared (dusty galaxy) sources,
- observations of the Milky Way, including the interstellar medium, distributed synchrotron emission and measurements of the Galactic magnetic field, and
- studies of the Solar System, including planets, asteroids, comets and the zodiacal light.

Planck had a higher resolution and sensitivity than WMAP, allowing it to probe the power spectrum of the CMB to much smaller scales (×3). It also observed in nine frequency bands rather than WMAP's five, with the goal of improving the astrophysical foreground models.

It is expected that most Planck measurements have been limited by how well foregrounds can be subtracted, rather than by the detector performance or length of the mission, a particularly important factor for the polarization measurements. The dominant foreground radiation depends on frequency, but could include synchrotron radiation from the Milky Way at low frequencies, and dust at high frequencies.

== Instruments ==
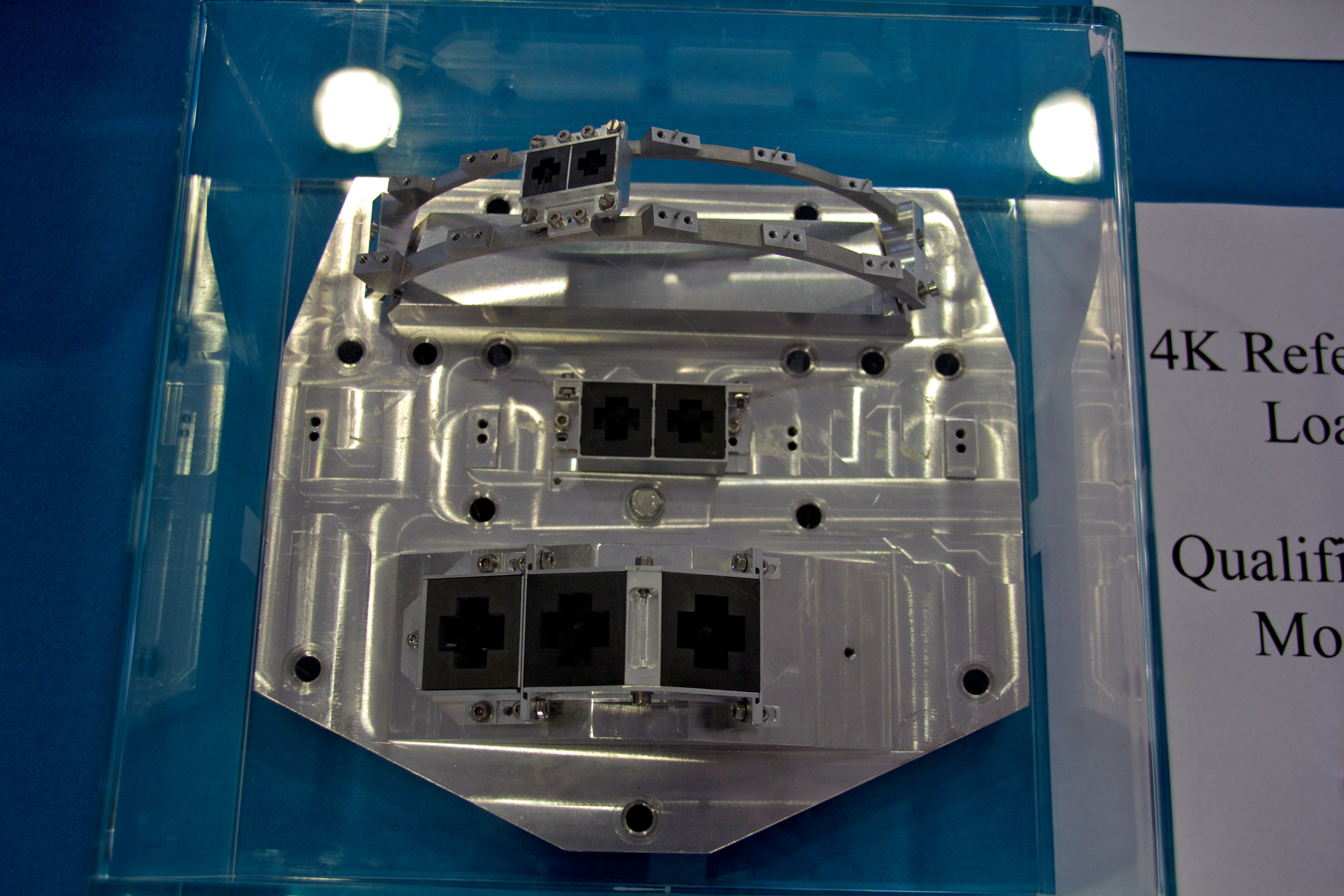
The 4 K reference load qualification model

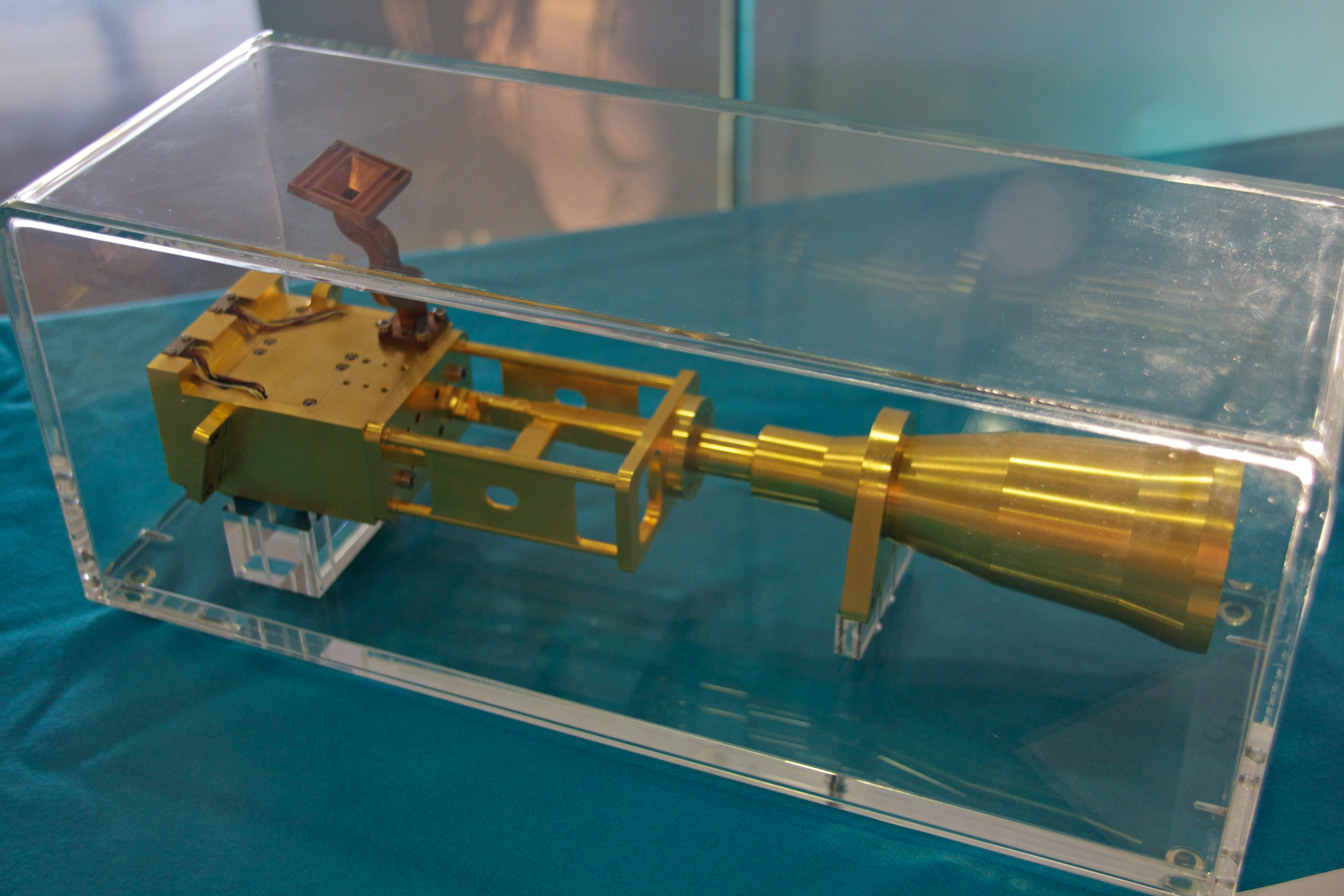
LFI 44 GHz horn and front-end chassis

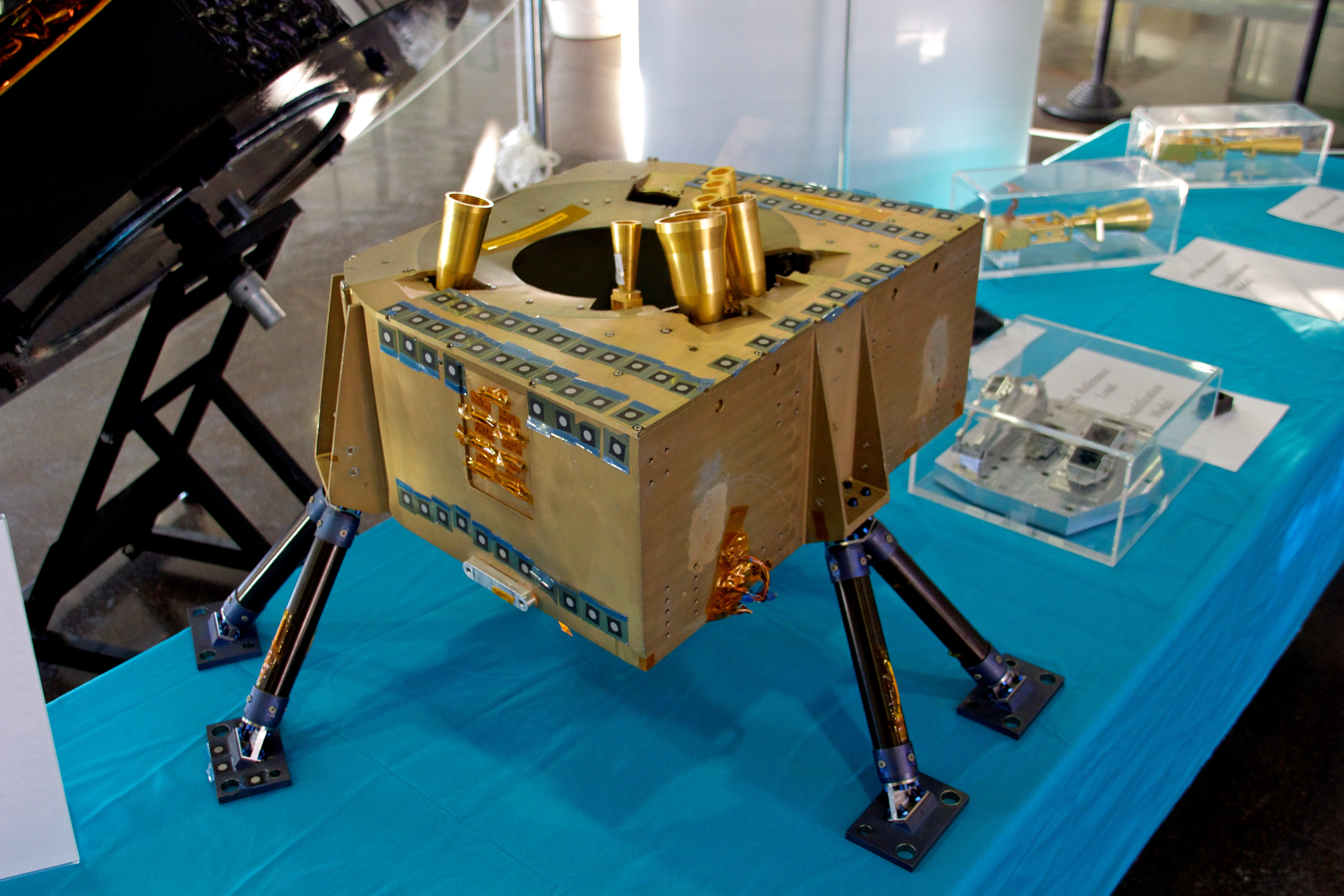
LFI focal plane model

The spacecraft carries two instruments: the Low Frequency Instrument (LFI) and the High Frequency Instrument (HFI). Both instruments can detect both the total intensity and polarization of photons, and together cover a frequency range of nearly 830 GHz (from 30 to 857 GHz). The cosmic microwave background spectrum peaks at a frequency of 160.2 GHz.

Planck's passive and active cooling systems allow its instruments to maintain a temperature of −273.05 °C (−459.49 °F), or 0.1 °C above absolute zero. From August 2009, Planck was the coldest known object in space, until its active coolant supply was exhausted in January 2012.

NASA played a role in the development of this mission and contributes to the analysis of scientific data. Its Jet Propulsion Laboratory built components of the science instruments, including bolometers for the high-frequency instrument, a 20-kelvin cryocooler for both the low- and high-frequency instruments, and amplifier technology for the low-frequency instrument.

=== Low Frequency Instrument ===
Frequency (GHz)	Bandwidth (Δν/ν)	Resolution (arcmin)	Sensitivity (total intensity) ΔT/T, 14-month observation (10^{−6})	Sensitivity (polarization) ΔT/T, 14-month observation (10^{−6})
30	0.2	33	2.0	2.8
44	0.2	24	2.7	3.9
70	0.2	14	4.7	6.7

The LFI has three frequency bands, covering the range of 30–70 GHz, covering the microwave to infrared regions of the electromagnetic spectrum. The detectors use high-electron-mobility transistors.

=== High Frequency Instrument ===
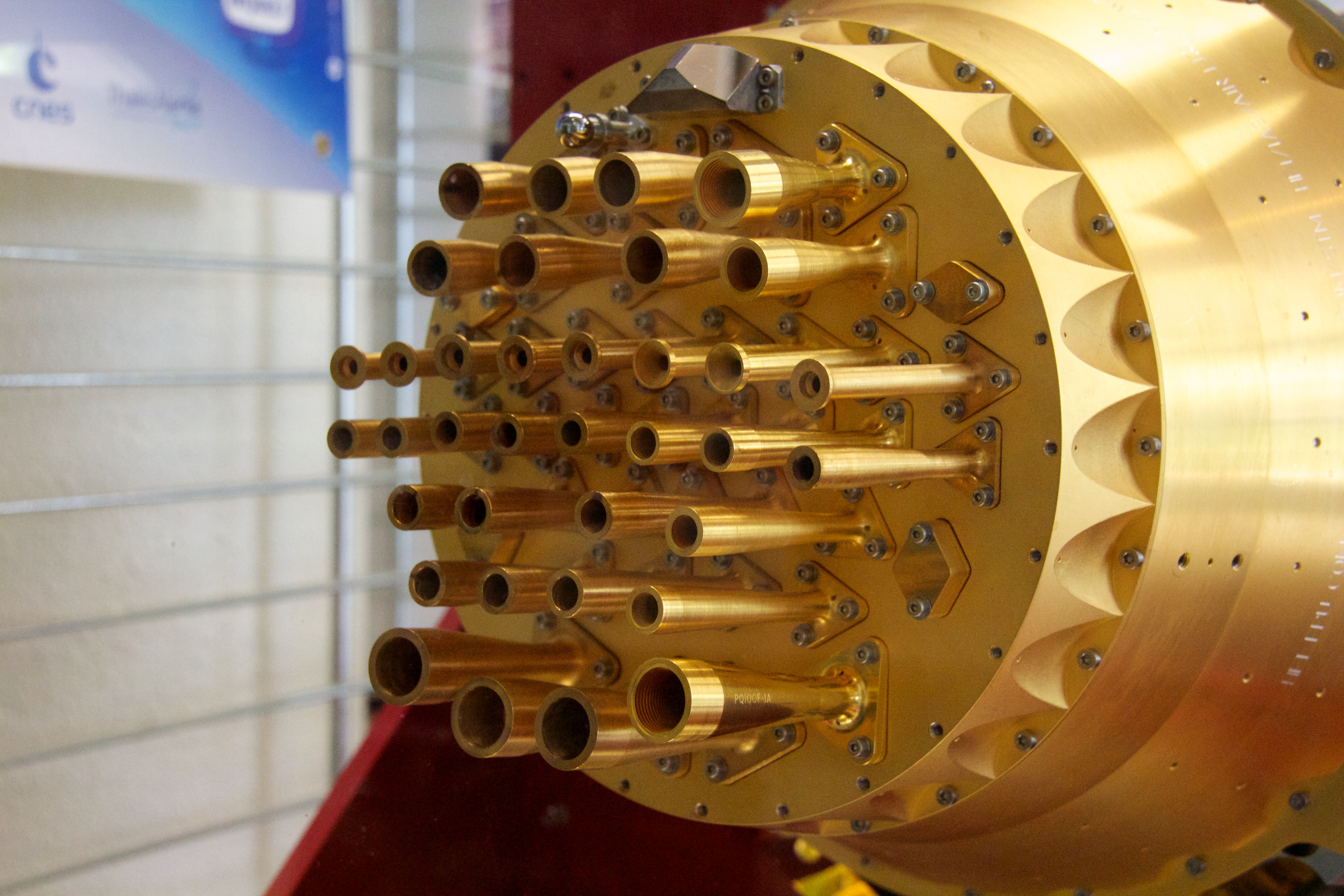
The High Frequency Instrument qualification model.

Frequency (GHz)	Bandwidth (Δν/ν)	Resolution (arcmin)	Sensitivity (total intensity) ΔT/T, 14-month observation (10^{−6})	Sensitivity (polarization) ΔT/T, 14-month observation (10^{−6})
100	0.33	10	2.5	4.0
143	0.33	7.1	2.2	4.2
217	0.33	5.0	4.8	9.8
353	0.33	5.0	14.7	29.8
545	0.33	5.0	147	N/A
857	0.33	5.0	6700	N/A

The HFI was sensitive between 100 and 857 GHz, using 52 bolometric detectors, manufactured by JPL/Caltech, optically coupled to the telescope through cold optics, manufactured by Cardiff University's School of Physics and Astronomy, consisting of a triple horn configuration and optical filters, a similar concept to that used in the Archeops balloon-borne experiment. These detection assemblies are divided into 6 frequency bands (centred at 100, 143, 217, 353, 545 and 857 GHz), each with a bandwidth of 33%. Of these six bands, only the lower four have the capability to measure the polarisation of incoming radiation; the two higher bands do not.

On 13 January 2012, it was reported that the on-board supply of helium-3 used in Planck's dilution refrigerator had been exhausted, and that the HFI would become unusable within a few days. By this date, Planck had completed five full scans of the CMB, exceeding its target of two. The LFI (cooled by helium-4) was expected to remain operational for another six to nine months.

== Service module ==
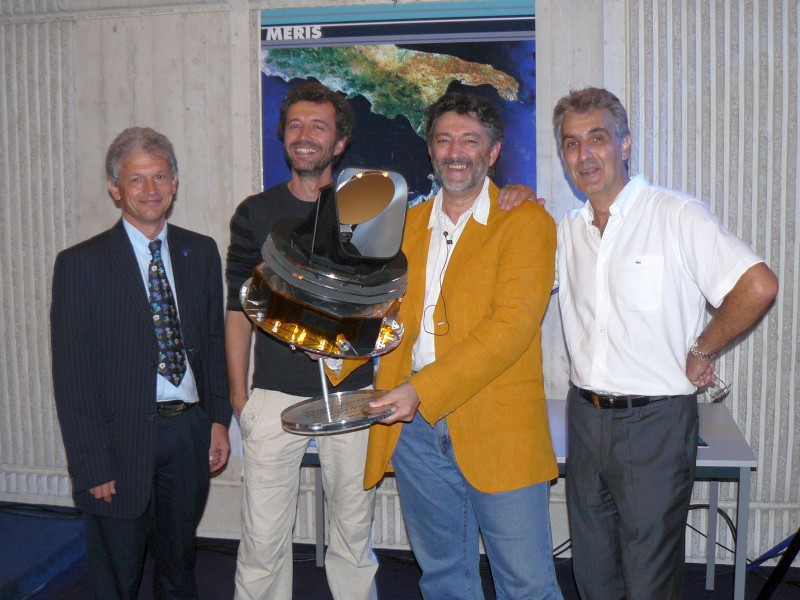
Some of the Herschel-Planck team, from left to right: Jean-Jacques Juillet, director of scientific programmes, Thales Alenia Space; Marc Sauvage, project scientist for Herschel PACS experiment, CEA; François Bouchet, Planck operations manager, IAP; and Jean-Michel Reix, Herschel & Planck operations manager, Thales Alenia Space. Taken during presentations of the first results for the missions, Cannes, October 2009.

A common service module (SVM) was designed and built by Thales Alenia Space in its Turin plant, for both the Herschel Space Observatory and Planck missions, combined into one single program.

The overall cost is estimated to be €700 million for the Planck and €1,100 million for the Herschel mission. Both figures include their mission's spacecraft and payload, (shared) launch and mission expenses, and science operations.

Structurally, the Herschel and Planck SVMs are very similar. Both SVMs are octagonal in shape and each panel is dedicated to accommodate a designated set of warm units, while taking into account the dissipation requirements of the different warm units, of the instruments, as well as the spacecraft. On both spacecraft, a common design was used for the avionics, attitude control and measurement (ACMS), command and data management (CDMS), power, and tracking, telemetry and command (TT&C) subsystems. All units on the SVM are redundant.

=== Power Subsystem ===
On each spacecraft, the power subsystem consists of a solar array, employing triple-junction solar cells, a battery and the power control unit (PCU). The PCU is designed to interface with the 30 sections of each solar array, to provide a regulated 28 volt bus, to distribute this power via protected outputs, and to handle the battery charging and discharging.

For Planck, the circular solar array is fixed on the bottom of the satellite, always facing the Sun as the satellite rotates on its vertical axis.

=== Attitude and Orbit Control ===
This function is performed by the attitude control computer (ACC), which is the platform for the attitude control and measurement subsystem (ACMS). It was designed to fulfil the pointing and slewing requirements of the Herschel and Planck payloads.

The Planck satellite rotates at one revolution per minute, with an aim of an absolute pointing error less than 37 arc-minutes. As Planck is also a survey platform, there is the additional requirement for pointing reproducibility error less than 2.5 arc-minutes over 20 days.

The main line-of-sight sensor in both Herschel and Planck is the star tracker.

== Launch and orbit ==
Animation of Planck Space Observatory's trajectory

Polar view

Equatorial view

Viewed from the Sun

Earth · Planck Space Observatory

The satellite was successfully launched, along with the Herschel Space Observatory, at 13:12:02 UTC on 14 May 2009 aboard an Ariane 5 ECA heavy launch vehicle from the Guiana Space Centre. The launch placed the craft into a very elliptical orbit (perigee: 270 km [170 mi], apogee: more than 1,120,000 km [700,000 mi]), bringing it near the L_{2} Lagrangian point of the Earth-Sun system, 1,500,000 kilometres (930,000 mi) from the Earth.

The manoeuvre to inject Planck into its final orbit around L_{2} was successfully completed on 3 July 2009, when it entered a Lissajous orbit with a 400,000 km (250,000 mi) radius around the L_{2} Lagrangian point. The temperature of the High Frequency Instrument reached just a tenth of a degree above absolute zero (0.1 K) on 3 July 2009, placing both the Low Frequency and High Frequency Instruments within their cryogenic operational parameters, making Planck fully operational.

== Decommissioning ==
In January 2012 the HFI exhausted its supply of liquid helium, causing the detector temperature to rise and rendering the HFI unusable. The LFI continued to be used until science operations ended on 3 October 2013. The spacecraft performed a manoeuvre on 9 October to move it away from Earth and its L_{2} point, placing it into a heliocentric orbit, while payload deactivation occurred on 19 October. Planck was commanded on 21 October to exhaust its remaining fuel supply; passivation activities were conducted later, including battery disconnection and the disabling of protection mechanisms. The final deactivation command, which switched off the spacecraft's transmitter, was sent to Planck on 23 October 2013 at 12:10:27 UTC.

== Results ==
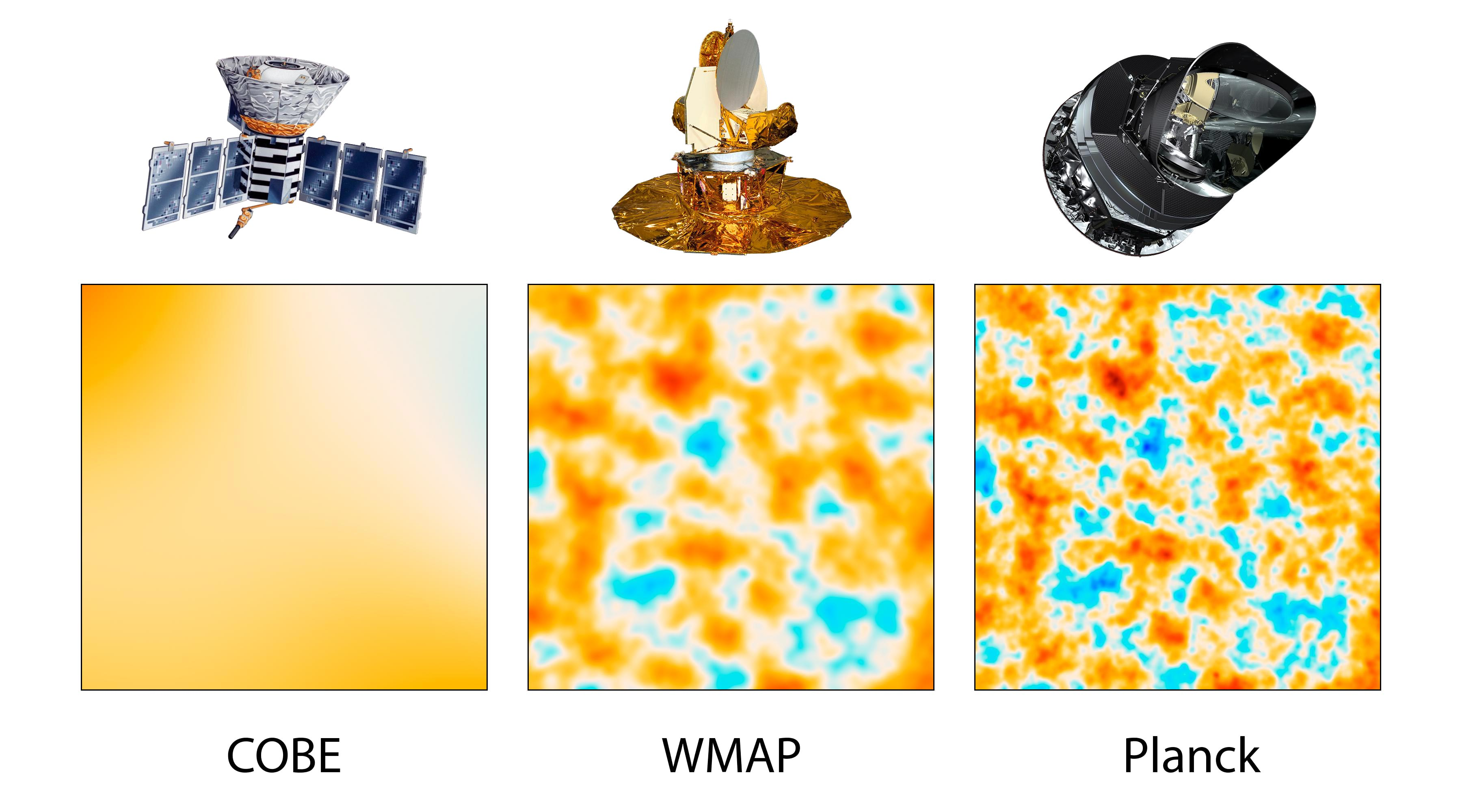
Comparison of CMB results from COBE, WMAP and Planck

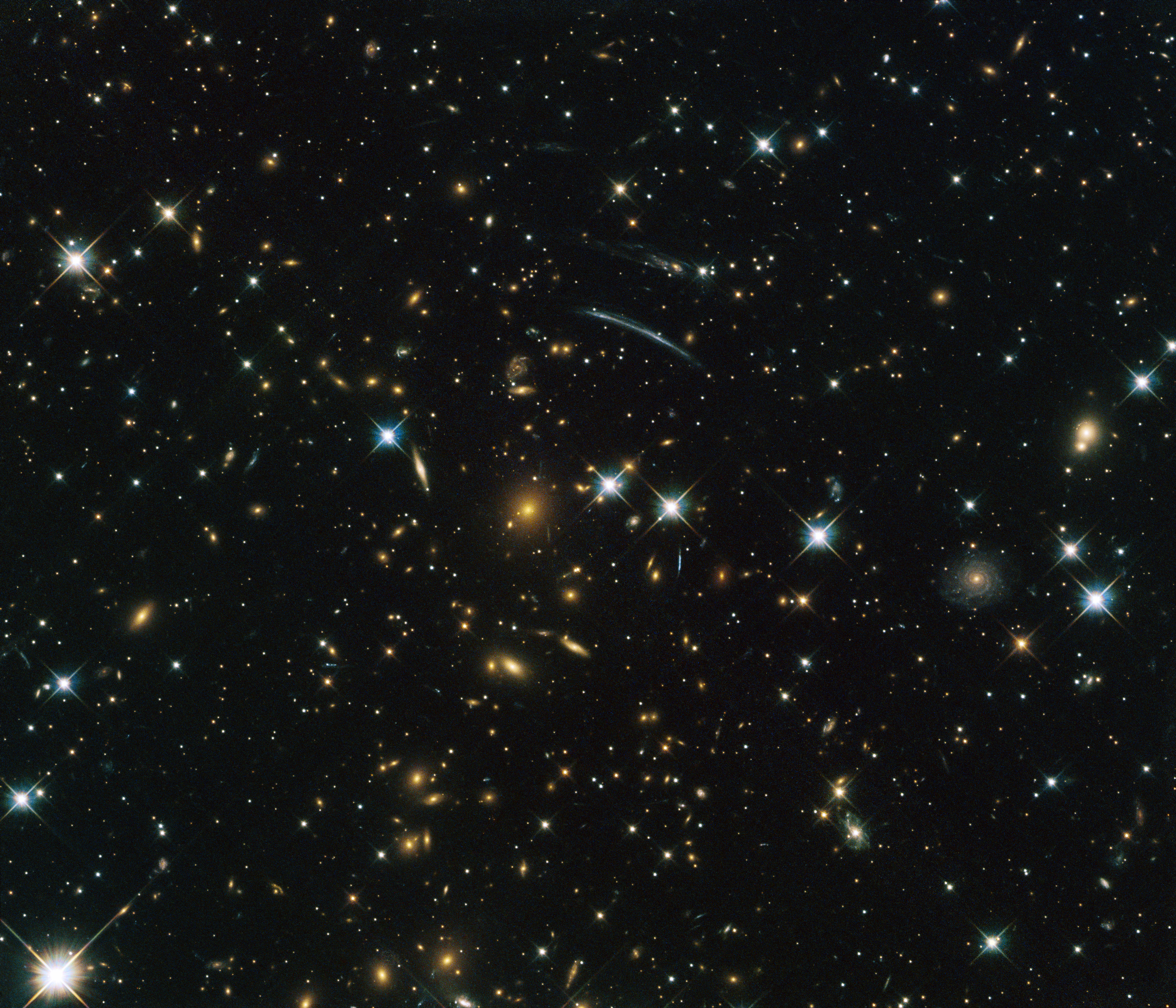
Galaxy cluster PLCK G004.5-19.5 was discovered through the Sunyaev–Zel'dovich effect.

Planck started its First All-Sky Survey on 13 August 2009. In September 2009, the European Space Agency announced the preliminary results from the Planck First Light Survey, which was performed to demonstrate the stability of the instruments and the ability to calibrate them over long periods. The results indicated that the data quality is excellent.

On 15 January 2010 the mission was extended by 12 months, with observation continuing until at least the end of 2011. After the successful conclusion of the First Survey, the spacecraft started its Second All Sky Survey on 14 February 2010. The last observations for the Second All Sky Survey were made on 28 May 2010.

Some planned pointing list data from 2009 has been released publicly, along with a video visualization of the surveyed sky.

On 17 March 2010, the first Planck photos were published, showing dust concentration within 500 light years from the Sun.

On 5 July 2010, the Planck mission delivered its first all-sky image.

The first public scientific result of Planck is the Early-Release Compact-Source Catalogue, released during the January 2011 Planck conference in Paris.

On 5 May 2014 a map of the galaxy's magnetic field created using Planck was published.

The Planck team and principal investigators Nazzareno Mandolesi and Jean-Loup Puget shared the 2018 Gruber Prize in Cosmology. Puget was also awarded the 2018 Shaw Prize in Astronomy. The 2019 Cocconi Prize of the European Physical Society has been awarded to the Planck collaboration (jointly with the WMAP collaboration).

=== 2013 data release ===
On 21 March 2013, the European-led research team behind the Planck cosmology probe released the mission's all-sky map of the cosmic microwave background. This map suggests the Universe is slightly older than thought: according to the map, subtle fluctuations in temperature were imprinted on the deep sky when the Universe was about 370,000 years old. The imprint reflects ripples that arose as early in the existence of the Universe as the first nonillionth (10^{−30}) of a second. It is theorised that these ripples gave rise to the present vast cosmic web of galactic clusters and dark matter. The 2013 release found an asymmetry in the statistics of the CMB with respect to viewing angle in the sky, determining that "deviations from isotropy have been found and demonstrated to be robust against component separation algorithm, mask choice and frequency dependence", more commonly known as the Axis of evil (cosmology). According to the team, the Universe is 13.798±0.037 billion-years-old, and contains 4.82%±0.05% ordinary matter, 26.8%±0.4% dark matter and 69%±1% dark energy. The Hubble constant was also measured to be 67.80±0.77 (km/s)/Mpc.

Cosmological parameters from 2013 Planck results
Parameter	Symbol	Planck Best fit	Planck 68% limits	Planck+lensing Best fit	Planck+lensing 68% limits	Planck+WP Best fit	Planck+WP 68% limits	Planck+WP +HighL Best fit	Planck+WP +HighL 68% limits	Planck+lensing +WP+highL Best fit	Planck+lensing +WP+highL 68% limits	Planck+WP +highL+BAO Best fit	Planck+WP +highL+BAO 68% limits
Baryon density	$\Omega_b h^2$	0.022068	0.02207±0.00033	0.022242	0.02217±0.00033	0.022032	0.02205±0.00028	0.022069	0.02207±0.00027	0.022199	0.02218±0.00026	0.022161	0.02214±0.00024
Cold dark matter density	$\Omega_c h^2$	0.12029	0.1196±0.0031	0.11805	0.1186±0.0031	0.12038	0.1199±0.0027	0.12025	0.1198±0.0026	0.11847	0.1186±0.0022	0.11889	0.1187±0.0017
100x approximation to r_{s} / D_{A} (CosmoMC)	$100\,\theta_{MC}$	1.04122	1.04132±0.00068	1.04150	1.04141±0.00067	1.04119	1.04131±0.00063	1.04130	1.04132±0.00063	1.04146	1.04144±0.00061	1.04148	1.04147±0.00056
Thomson scattering optical depth due to reionization	$\tau$	0.0925	0.097±0.038	0.0949	0.089±0.032	0.0925	0.089+0.012 −0.014	0.0927	0.091+0.013 −0.014	0.0943	0.090+0.013 −0.014	0.0952	0.092±0.013
Power spectrum of curvature perturbations	$\ln(10^{10} A_s)$	3.098	3.103±0.072	3.098	3.085±0.057	3.0980	3.089+0.024 −0.027	3.0959	3.090±0.025	3.0947	3.087±0.024	3.0973	3.091±0.025
Scalar spectral index	$n_s$	0.9624	0.9616±0.0094	0.9675	0.9635±0.0094	0.9619	0.9603±0.0073	0.9582	0.9585±0.0070	0.9624	0.9614±0.0063	0.9611	0.9608±0.0054
Hubble's constant (km Mpc^{−1} s^{−1})	$H_0$	67.11	67.4±1.4	68.14	67.9±1.5	67.04	67.3±1.2	67.15	67.3±1.2	67.94	67.9±1.0	67.77	67.80±0.77
Dark energy density	$\Omega_\Lambda$	0.6825	0.686±0.020	0.6964	0.693±0.019	0.6817	0.685+0.018 −0.016	0.6830	0.685+0.017 −0.016	0.6939	0.693±0.013	0.6914	0.692±0.010
Density fluctuations at 8h^{−1} Mpc	$\sigma_8$	0.8344	0.834±0.027	0.8285	0.823±0.018	0.8347	0.829±0.012	0.8322	0.828±0.012	0.8271	0.8233±0.0097	0.8288	0.826±0.012
Redshift of reionization	$z_{re}$	11.35	11.4+4.0 −2.8	11.45	10.8+3.1 −2.5	11.37	11.1±1.1	11.38	11.1±1.1	11.42	11.1±1.1	11.52	11.3±1.1
Age of the Universe (Gy)	$t_0$	13.819	13.813±0.058	13.784	13.796±0.058	13.8242	13.817±0.048	13.8170	13.813±0.047	13.7914	13.794±0.044	13.7965	13.798±0.037
100× angular scale of sound horizon at last-scattering	$100\,\theta_*$	1.04139	1.04148±0.00066	1.04164	1.04156±0.00066	1.04136	1.04147±0.00062	1.04146	1.04148±0.00062	1.04161	1.04159±0.00060	1.04163	1.04162±0.00056
Comoving size of the sound horizon at z = z_{drag}	$r_{drag}$	147.34	147.53±0.64	147.74	147.70±0.63	147.36	147.49±0.59	147.35	147.47±0.59	147.68	147.67±0.50	147.611	147.68±0.45

=== 2015 data release ===
Results from an analysis of Planck's full mission were made public on 1 December 2014 at a conference in Ferrara, Italy. A full set of papers detailing the mission results were released in February 2015. Some of the results include:

- More agreement with previous WMAP results on parameters such as the density and distribution of matter in the Universe, as well as more accurate results with less margin of error.
- Confirmation of the Universe having a 26% content of dark matter. These results also raise related questions about the positron excess over electrons detected by the Alpha Magnetic Spectrometer, an experiment on the International Space Station. Previous research suggested that positrons could be created by the collision of dark matter particles, which could only occur if the probability of dark matter collisions is significantly higher now than in the early Universe. Planck data suggests that the probability of such collisions must remain constant over time to account for the structure of the Universe, negating the previous theory.
- Validation of the simplest models of inflation, thus giving the Lambda-CDM model stronger support.
- That there are likely only three types of neutrinos, with a fourth proposed sterile neutrino unlikely to exist.

Project scientists worked too with BICEP2 scientists to release joint research in 2015 answering whether a signal detected by BICEP2 was evidence of primordial gravitational waves, or was simple background noise from dust in the Milky Way galaxy. Their results suggest the latter.

Cosmological parameters from 2015 Planck results
Parameter	Symbol	TT+lowP 68% limits	TT+lowP +lensing 68% limits	TT+lowP +lensing+ext 68% limits	TT,TE,EE+lowP 68% limits	TT,TE,EE+lowP +lensing 68% limits	TT,TE,EE+lowP +lensing+ext 68% limits
Baryon density	$\Omega_b h^2$	0.02222±0.00023	0.02226±0.00023	0.02227±0.00020	0.02225±0.00016	0.02226±0.00016	0.02230±0.00014
Cold dark matter density	$\Omega_c h^2$	0.1197±0.0022	0.1186±0.0020	0.1184±0.0012	0.1198±0.0015	0.1193±0.0014	0.1188±0.0010
100x approximation to r_{s} / D_{A} (CosmoMC)	$100\,\theta_{MC}$	1.04085±0.00047	1.04103±0.00046	1.04106±0.00041	1.04077±0.00032	1.04087±0.00032	1.04093±0.00030
Thomson scattering optical depth due to reionization	$\tau$	0.078±0.019	0.066±0.016	0.067±0.013	0.079±0.017	0.063±0.014	0.066±0.012
Power spectrum of curvature perturbations	$\ln(10^{10} A_s)$	3.089±0.036	3.062±0.029	3.064±0.024	3.094±0.034	3.059±0.025	3.064±0.023
Scalar spectral index	$n_s$	0.9655±0.0062	0.9677±0.0060	0.9681±0.0044	0.9645±0.0049	0.9653±0.0048	0.9667±0.0040
Hubble's constant (km Mpc^{−1} s^{−1})	$H_0$	67.31±0.96	67.81±0.92	67.90±0.55	67.27±0.66	67.51±0.64	67.74±0.46
Dark energy density	$\Omega_\Lambda$	0.685±0.013	0.692±0.012	0.6935±0.0072	0.6844±0.0091	0.6879±0.0087	0.6911±0.0062
Matter density	$\Omega_m$	0.315±0.013	0.308±0.012	0.3065±0.0072	0.3156±0.0091	0.3121±0.0087	0.3089±0.0062
Density fluctuations at 8h^{−1} Mpc	$\sigma_8$	0.829±0.014	0.8149±0.0093	0.8154±0.0090	0.831±0.013	0.8150±0.0087	0.8159±0.0086
Redshift of reionization	$z_{re}$	9.9+1.8 −1.6	8.8+1.7 −1.4	8.9+1.3 −1.2	10.0+1.7 −1.5	8.5+1.4 −1.2	8.8+1.2 −1.1
Age of the Universe (Gy)	$t_0$	13.813±0.038	13.799±0.038	13.796±0.029	13.813±0.026	13.807±0.026	13.799±0.021
Redshift at decoupling	$z_*$	1090.09±0.42	1089.94±0.42	1089.90±0.30	1090.06±0.30	1090.00±0.29	1089.90±0.23
Comoving size of the sound horizon at z = z_{*}	$r_*$	144.61±0.49	144.89±0.44	144.93±0.30	144.57±0.32	144.71±0.31	144.81±0.24
100× angular scale of sound horizon at last-scattering	$100\,\theta_*$	1.04105±0.00046	1.04122±0.00045	1.04126±0.00041	1.04096±0.00032	1.04106±0.00031	1.04112±0.00029
Redshift with baryon-drag optical depth = 1	$z_{drag}$	1059.57±0.46	1059.57±0.47	1059.60±0.44	1059.65±0.31	1059.62±0.31	1059.68±0.29
Comoving size of the sound horizon at z = z_{drag}	$r_{drag}$	147.33±0.49	147.60±0.43	147.63±0.32	147.27±0.31	147.41±0.30	147.50±0.24
Legend	68% limits: Parameter 68% confidence limits for the base ΛCDM model; TT, TE, EE: Planck Cosmic microwave background (CMB) power spectra; here TT represents temperature power spectrum, TE is temperature-polarization cross spectrum, and EE is polarisation power spectrum.; lowP: Planck polarization data in the low-ℓ likelihood; lensing: CMB lensing reconstruction; ext: External data (BAO+JLA+H0). BAO: Baryon acoustic oscillations, JLA: Joint Light-curve Analysis (of supernovae), H0: Hubble constant

=== 2018 final data release ===
Results from the final analysis of Planck data were released in July 2018. The mission provided the most precise measurements of the parameters of the standard ΛCDM cosmological model and further strengthened its status as the best description of the Universe. Planck measured the Hubble constant to be 67.4 ± 0.5 km/s/Mpc, increasing the tension with direct local measurements. The data confirmed that the Universe consists of approximately 68.5% dark energy, 26.6% dark matter, and 4.9% ordinary matter, and showed that space is remarkably flat. The results also supported the simplest models of cosmic inflation, found no evidence for primordial non-Gaussianity, and placed tighter constraints on neutrino properties, including an upper limit of 0.12 eV on the sum of neutrino masses. No evidence was found for sterile neutrinos, additional relativistic particles, or other physics beyond the standard ΛCDM model. The final polarization and gravitational lensing maps of the cosmic microwave background provided the most detailed picture to date of the early Universe and its evolution.

Cosmological parameters from 2018 Planck results
Parameter	Symbol	TT+lowE 68% limits	TE+lowE 68% limits	EE+lowE 68% limits	TT,TE,EE+lowE 68% limits	TT,TE,EE+lowE +lensing 68% limits	TT,TE,EE+lowE +lensing+BAO 68% limits
Baryon density	$\Omega_b h^2$	0.02212±0.00022	0.02249±0.00025	0.0240±0.0012	0.02236±0.00015	0.02237±0.00015	0.02242±0.00014
Cold dark matter density	$\Omega_c h^2$	0.1206±0.0021	0.1177±0.0020	0.1158±0.0046	0.1202±0.0014	0.1200±0.0012	0.11933±0.00091
100x approximation to r_{s} / D_{A} (CosmoMC)	$100\,\theta_{MC}$	1.04077±0.00047	1.04139±0.00049	1.03999±0.00089	1.04090±0.00031	1.04092±0.00031	1.04101±0.00029
Thomson scattering optical depth due to reionization	$\tau$	0.0522±0.0080	0.0496±0.0085	0.0527±0.0090	0.0544+0.0070 −0.0081	0.0544±0.0073	0.0561±0.0071
Power spectrum of curvature perturbations	$\ln(10^{10} A_s)$	3.040±0.016	3.018+0.020 −0.018	3.052±0.022	3.045±0.016	3.044±0.014	3.047±0.014
Scalar spectral index	$n_s$	0.9626±0.0057	0.967±0.011	0.980±0.015	0.9649±0.0044	0.9649±0.0042	0.9665±0.0038
Hubble's constant (km s^{−1} Mpc^{−1})	$H_0$	66.88±0.92	68.44±0.91	69.9±2.7	67.27±0.60	67.36±0.54	67.66±0.42
Dark energy density	$\Omega_\Lambda$	0.679±0.013	0.699±0.012	0.711+0.033 −0.026	0.6834±0.0084	0.6847±0.0073	0.6889±0.0056
Matter density	$\Omega_m$	0.321±0.013	0.301±0.012	0.289+0.026 −0.033	0.3166±0.0084	0.3153±0.0073	0.3111±0.0056
Density fluctuations at 8h^{−1} Mpc	S_{8} = $\sigma_8$($\Omega_m$/0.3)^{0.5}	0.840±0.024	0.794±0.024	0.781+0.052 −0.060	0.834±0.016	0.832±0.013	0.825±0.011
Redshift of reionization	$z_{re}$	7.50±0.82	7.11+0.91 −0.75	7.10+0.87 −0.73	7.68±0.79	7.67±0.73	7.82±0.71
Age of the Universe (Gy)	$t_0$	13.830±0.037	13.761±0.038	13.64+0.16 −0.14	13.800±0.024	13.797±0.023	13.787±0.020
Redshift at decoupling	$z_*$	1090.30±0.41	1089.57±0.42	1087.8+1.6 −1.7	1089.95±0.27	1089.92±0.25	1089.80±0.21
Comoving size of the sound horizon at z = z_{*}(Mpc)	$r_*$	144.46±0.48	144.95±0.48	144.29±0.64	144.39±0.30	144.43±0.26	144.57±0.22
100× angular scale of sound horizon at last-scattering	$100\,\theta_*$	1.04097±0.00046	1.04156±0.00049	1.04001±0.00086	1.04109±0.00030	1.04110±0.00031	1.04119±0.00029
Redshift with baryon-drag optical depth = 1	$z_{drag}$	1059.39±0.46	1060.03±0.54	1063.2±2.4	1059.93±0.30	1059.94±0.30	1060.01±0.29
Comoving size of the sound horizon at z = z_{drag}	$r_{drag}$	147.21±0.48	147.59±0.49	146.46±0.70	147.05±0.30	147.09±0.26	147.21±0.23
Legend	68% limits: Parameter 68% confidence limits for the base ΛCDM model; TT, TE, EE: Planck Cosmic microwave background (CMB) power spectra; here TT represents temperature power spectrum, TE is temperature-polarization cross spectrum, and EE is polarisation power spectrum.; lowP: Planck polarization data in the low-ℓ likelihood; lensing: CMB lensing reconstruction; ext: External data (BAO+JLA+H0). BAO: Baryon acoustic oscillations, JLA: Joint Light-curve Analysis (of supernovae), H0: Hubble constant

== See also ==
- DustPedia
- Lambda-CDM model
- List of cosmological computation software
- Observational cosmology
- Physical cosmology
- Terahertz radiation
