= DustPedia =

Space science project

A collage of the DustPedia galaxies as seen by the Spectral and Photometric Imaging Receiver (SPIRE) instrument aboard Herschel.

DustPedia is a project funded by the European Union for exploitation of space science and exploration data. It is a collaboration of six European institutions with a primary goal of exploiting existing data in the Herschel Space Observatory and Planck Telescope databases. This data will be combined with other available data from both ground-based and space-based telescopes to make the most extensive and intensive study of galaxies in the nearby Universe.

== Context ==
Many observations of galaxies over large look back times correspond very well with cosmological models of galaxy and larger scale structure formation. This has led to the wide spread belief that the current cosmological model, ΛCDM (Lambda Cold Dark Matter), is broadly correct. Although there is good agreement over large spatial scales, there are some challenging disagreements between theory and observation on smaller scales, particularly properties of galaxies and their nearby environment. The distributions of galaxy mass and size, their locations within larger scale structures in the Universe and their star formation histories as a function of galactic mass are all examples of disparity with the currently favoured model. In a 2010 Nature article, Peebles and Nusser stress the importance of nearby galaxies if one is to understand the detailed processes of galaxy evolution and hence develop a complete model of how galaxies change with time. They specifically say that "….nearby galaxies offer rich and still far from completely explored clues to a better picture of how galaxies form." The reason is that nearby galaxies can be studied in far greater detail than those that lie at the edge of the cosmos. In general, cosmological surveys cover such small areas of the sky that they do not sample the local population at all. Observations of cosmic dust address many aspects of the current galaxy evolutionary model such as star formation rate, growth of the metal abundance, loss of metals in galactic winds, and physical processes in the interstellar medium. As a result, they offer the potential for a much better understanding of galaxy evolution.

== Objectives ==
The DustPedia project aims at addressing five specific but quite broad science issues that have a direct bearing on current evolutionary models of galaxies:

- Measure the complete UV-mm spectral energy distribution (SEDs) for a large number (> 1000) of galaxies, and for different environments within individual galaxies.
- Interpret the galaxy SEDs using radiative transfer and full SED models, to derive stellar, gas and dust properties, star formation rates and histories as a function of morphological type.
- Determine how the dust NIR-mm/radio SED evolves throughout the Universe and how this is related to the underlying dust properties
- Develop a dust evolution model that is consistent with the SEDs of galaxies of different morphological types and determine the primary sources and sinks for cosmic dust.
- Derive dust mass functions to the lowest-possible luminosities and masses and to compare these with cosmological surveys and the cosmic far infrared background.

== Sample selection ==
To achieve the objectives set out above a representative sample of galaxies for study was defined. The Herschel data alone does not provide a large completely sampled region of sky, but it is possible to use the WISE data to define a near infrared selected sample. As many galaxy properties correlate first with stellar mass, the near infrared, where for most galaxies the bulk of the stellar radiation emerges, provides the best available choice for galaxy selection. There are 3045 galaxies with a WISE 3.4μm detection (SN > 3) within 3000 km s^{−1} (≈40 Mpc) of the Sun and with a size of D_{25}>1 arc min (≈12 kpc at 40 Mpc) – the W sample. Currently within the Herschel archive there are 613 observations of galaxies from this W sample. The intersection of these two samples will be referred to as the WH sample. A similar selection will be carried out for galaxies detected by Planck once the final data becomes available in late 2013 and the intersection of this sample with the WH sample is the WHP sample. The WH sample consists of 80 early type galaxies (T< 0) and 533 late types, 70 of which may be described as star forming irregulars/dwarfs. Also, within the WH sample, 94 galaxies have D_{25}> 5 arc min and so are resolved in the Herschel bands and lend themselves to full radiative transfer and infrared/mm SED modelling.
