= Axis of evil (cosmology) =

Anomaly in cosmic microwave background

The "axis of evil" is a purported correlation between the plane of the Solar System and aspects of the cosmic microwave background (CMB). Such a correlation would give the plane of the Solar System and hence the location of Earth a greater significance than might be expected by chance, a result which has been claimed to be evidence of a departure from the Copernican principle. However, a 2016 study compared isotropic and anisotropic cosmological models against WMAP and Planck data and found no evidence for anisotropy.

== Overview ==
The cosmic microwave background (CMB) radiation signature presents a direct large-scale view of the universe that can be used to identify whether our position or movement has any particular significance. There has been much publicity about analysis of results from the Wilkinson Microwave Anisotropy Probe (WMAP) and Planck mission that show both expected and unexpected anisotropies in the CMB. The motion of the solar system and the orientation of the plane of the ecliptic are aligned with features of the microwave sky, which appear to be caused by structure at the edge of the observable universe. Specifically, with respect to the ecliptic plane, the "top half" of the CMB is slightly cooler than the "bottom half"; furthermore, the quadrupole and octupole axes are only a few degrees apart, and these axes are aligned with the top/bottom divide.

Lawrence Krauss is quoted as follows in a 2006 Edge.org article:

The new results are either telling us that all of science is wrong and we're the center of the universe, or maybe the data is simply incorrect, or maybe it's telling us there's something weird about the microwave background results and that maybe, maybe there's something wrong with our theories on the larger scales.

== Observations ==
Some anomalies in the background radiation have been reported which are aligned with the plane of the Solar System. These are unexplained by the Copernican principle and suggest that the Solar System's alignment is special in relation to the background radiation of the universe. Land and Magueijo in 2005 dubbed this alignment the "axis of evil" owing to the implications for current models of the cosmos, although several later studies have shown systematic errors in the collection of those data and the way they have been processed. Various studies of the CMB anisotropy data either confirm the Copernican principle, model the alignments in a non-homogeneous universe still consistent with the principle, or attempt to explain them as local phenomena. Some of these alternate explanations were discussed by Copi et al., who claimed that data from the Planck satellite could shed significant light on whether the preferred direction and alignments were spurious. Coincidence is a possible explanation. Chief scientist from WMAP, Charles L. Bennett suggested coincidence and human psychology were involved, "I do think there is a bit of a psychological effect, people want to find unusual things."

Data from the Planck Telescope published in 2013 has since found stronger evidence for the anisotropy. "For a long time, part of the community was hoping that this would go away, but it hasn't", says Dominik Schwarz of the University of Bielefeld in Germany.

In 2015, there was no consensus on the nature of this and other observed anomalies and their statistical significance is unclear. For example, a study that includes the Planck mission results shows how masking techniques could introduce errors that when taken into account can render several anomalies, including the axis of evil, not statistically significant. A 2016 study compared isotropic and anisotropic cosmological models against WMAP and Planck data and found no evidence for anisotropy.

== See also ==
- List of unsolved problems in physics
- CMB cold spot
