= Institut d'Astrophysique de Paris =

French research Institute

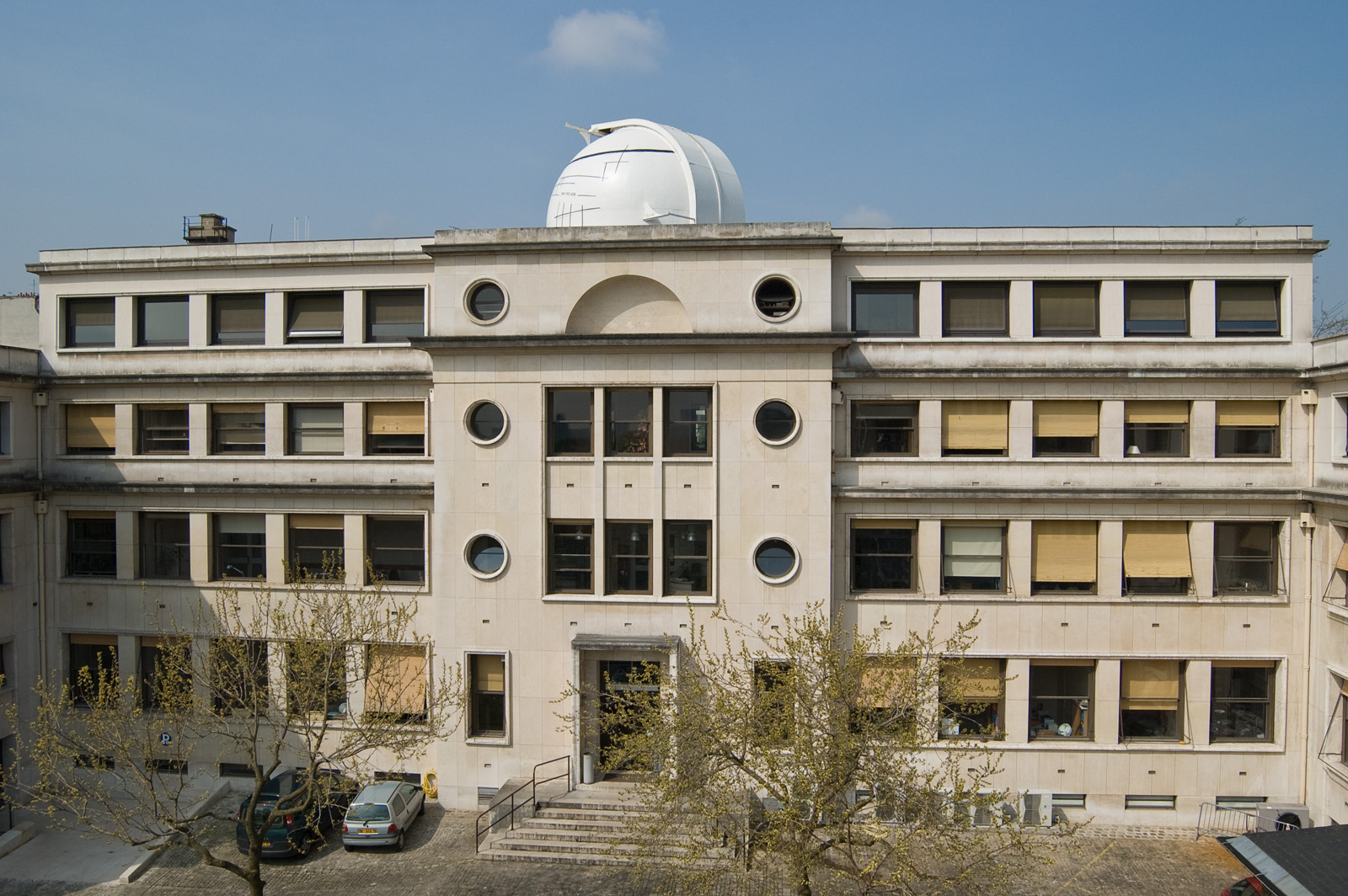
- Nickname: IAP
- Established: 30 October 1936; 89 years ago
- Director: Kumiko Kotera
- Location: Paris, 75014, France; 48.834997°N 2.335303°E
- Affiliations: CNRS, Sorbonne University
- Website: www.iap.fr
- Location within Paris

The Institut d'Astrophysique de Paris (translated: Paris Institute of Astrophysics) is a research institute in Paris, France. The Institute is part of the Sorbonne University and is associated with the CNRS Centre national de la recherche scientifique. It is located at 98bis, Boulevard Arago Il in the 14th arrondissement of Paris, adjacent to the Paris Observatory.

== History ==
The IAP was created in 1936 by the French ministry of education under Jean Zay, initially for the purpose of processing data received from the Observatory of Haute-Provence, which was created at the same time. Construction of the building started on 6 January 1938. On 15 June 1939, Henri Mineur became the institute's first director. IAP scientists were at first located in Paris Observatory, then in the École normale supérieure de Paris before arriving in the current building in 1944 which was finally completed in 1952.

== Current research ==
The IAP includes 160 researchers, engineers, technicians, and administrators and regularly welcomes many visitors and students.

The main areas of research at the IAP are:

- General relativity and cosmology
- Cosmological structure formation
- High-energy astrophysics
- Origin and evolution of galaxies
- Stellar structure
- Exoplanets

The IAP is one of five laboratories of AERA, the European association for research in astronomy. The laboratory is situated at the interface between two disciplines, astrophysics and theoretical physics. The International Astronomical Union has its seat at the IAP.

== Directors ==
- 1936-1954 : Henri Mineur
- 1954-1960 : André Danjon
- 1960-1971 : André Lallemand
- 1972-1977 : Jean-Claude Pecker
- 1978-1989 : Jean Audouze
- 1990-1998 : Alain Omont
- 1998-2004 : Bernard Fort
- 2005-2013 : Laurent Vigroux
- 2014-2020 : Francis Bernardeau
- 2021-2023 : François Bouchet
- 2024-2024 : Patrick Peter
- since 2025 : Kumiko Kotera
