= Jacobs (surname) =

Origin
- Meaning: "son of Jacob"

Other names
- Related names: Jacob, Jacobsen, Jacobson

Jacobs is a patronymic medieval surname. Its origin is from the given name Jacob, derived from the Latin Jacobus, itself derived from the Hebrew language personal name Yaakov, from the Hebrew word akev ("heel"). It is common in English speaking countries and German speaking countries. There are many variant spellings. The first record of the surname is in 1244 in the "Cartularium Monasterii de Rameseia". Jacobs is also an ancient Anglo-Saxon surname that came from the baptismal name Jacob. The surname Jacobs referred to the son of Jacob which belongs to the category of patronymic surnames. Notable people with the surname Jacobs include:

== A ==
- A. J. Jacobs (born 1968), American journalist and author
- AJ Jacobs (rugby union) (born 1985), South African rugby referee
- Aad Jacobs (born 1936), Dutch businessman
- Abe Jacobs (1928–2023), New Zealand professional wrestler
- Adolph Jacobs (1939–2014), American guitar player
- Adrian Jacobs (born 1980), South African rugby player
- Alan Jacobs (academic) (born 1958), American writer and professor
- Alan Jacobs (filmmaker), American film director and screenwriter
- Aletta Jacobs (1854–1929), Dutch physician, feminist and pacifist
- Alfred Jacobs (1897–1976), Australian activist for civil liberties and Aboriginal rights
- Allan Jacobs (born 1928), American urban designer, planner and writer
- Allen Jacobs American football player
- Alma Smith Jacobs (1916–1997), American librarian
- Amber Jacobs (born 1982), American basketball player
- Ananda Jacobs (born 1983), American actress, singer, model, producer and composer
- Andreas Jacobs (born 1963), German businessman
- Andrew Jacobs (disambiguation), several people, including:

- Andrew Jacobs (journalist), reporter for The New York Times and documentary film director and producer
- Andrew Jacobs Sr. (1906–1992), lawyer, judge, and Congressman for one term, in Indiana
- Andrew Jacobs Jr. (1932–2013), lawyer, Indiana state legislator, and Congressman
- Andy Jacobs (born 1952), British sports radio personality

- Anja Jacobs (born 1974), German film director
- Anthony Jacobs, Baron Jacobs (1931–2014), British businessman and politician
- Ariël Jacobs (born 1953), Belgian football player and manager
- Arnold Jacobs (1915–1998), American orchestral tuba player
- Arnold Jacobs (cricketer) (1892–1974), Argentine cricketer
- Art Jacobs (1902–1967), American baseball pitcher
- Arthur Jacobs (disambiguation), several people, including:

- Arthur Jacobs (1922–1996), English musicologist
- Arthur Jacobs, New Zealand cricketer known as Bert Jacobs (cricketer)
- Arthur I. Jacobs (1858–1918), American drill-chuck innovator
- Arthur P. Jacobs (1922–1973), American film producer

== B ==
- Bárbara Jacobs (born 1947), Mexican writer
- Ben Jacobs (disambiguation), several people, including:

- Ben Jacobs (American football) (born 1988), American football player
- Ben Jacobs (Australian rules footballer) (born 1992), Australian rules footballer
- Ben Jacobs (journalist), U.S. journalist
- Ben Jacobs (rugby union) (born 1982), Australian rugby player

- Benjamin Jacobs (dentist) (1919–2004), Polish Jew, Auschwitz survivor
- Benjamin R. Jacobs (1879–1963), American biochemist
- Bert Jacobs (1941–1999), Dutch football player and manager
- Beverley Jacobs (born 1965), Canadian First Nation lawyer and activist
- Bobby Jacobs (born 1965), Dutch bassist and composer for the prog-rock group Focus
- Brad Jacobs (born 1985), Canadian curler
- Brandon Jacobs (born 1982), American football player
- Brian Jacobs (actor), American actor
- Bruce Jacobs (disambiguation), several people, including:

- Bruce Jacobs (radio host) (born 1964), American talk radio host
- Bruce Jacobs (field hockey) (born 1975), South African field hockey player
- J. Bruce Jacobs (1943–2019), American-born Australian academic

== C ==
- C. Scott Jacobs, American communication theorist
- Cameron Jacobs (born 1989), South African rugby player
- Carrie Jacobs-Bond (1862–1946), American singer, pianist, and songwriter
- Charles Jacobs (disambiguation), several people, including:

- Charles Fenno Jacobs (1904–1974), American photographer
- Charles Jacobs (activist), with American Anti-Slavery Group

- Charlotte Jacobs (1847–1916), Dutch feminist and pharmacist
- Chris Jacobs (disambiguation), several people, including:

- Chris Jacobs (politician) (born 1967), American politician
- Chris Jacobs (swimmer) (born 1964), American swimmer
- Chris Jacobs (television host), American co-host of Discovery Channel television show Overhaulin'

- Christian Jacobs (born 1972), American musician, television producer, voice actor and former child actor
- Christianne Meneses Jacobs (born 1971), Nicaraguan American writer, editor, and teacher
- Clare Jacobs (1886–1971), American pole vaulter
- Clare Jacobs, New Zealand general practitioner
- Curtis Jacobs (born 2002), American football player

== D ==
- Daniel Jacobs (disambiguation), several people, including:

- Dan Jacobs (trumpeter) (born 1942), American jazz trumpeter
- Dan Jacobs (born 1982), American metal guitarist with the band Atreyu
- Danie Jacobs (1904–1999), South African Olympic athlete
- Daniel Jacobs (boxer) (born 1987), American professional boxer
- Danny Jacobs (actor) (born 1968), American voice actor
- Danny Jacobs (footballer) (born 1980), Australian rules footballer

- Dave Jacobs (born 1957), American football player
- David Jacobs (disambiguation), several people, including:

- David Jacobs (broadcaster) (1926–2013), BBC radio and television presenter and actor
- David Jacobs (cricketer, born 1989), South African cricketer
- David Jacobs (gymnast), American gymnast
- David Jacobs (Ontario politician), Canadian lawyer and politician
- David Jacobs (sociologist), American sociologist
- David Jacobs (steroid dealer) (c. 1973–2008), American personal trainer
- David Jacobs (table tennis) (born 1977), Indonesian table tennis player
- David Jacobs (Welsh athlete) (1888–1976), Welsh sprinter
- David Jacobs (writer) (1939–2023), American creator/writer of the television series Dallas and Knots Landing
- David Anthony Jacobs, Baron Jacobs (1931–2014), British businessman and Liberal Democrat politician
- David M. Jacobs (born 1942), American UFO and abduction phenomenon researcher
- Davy Jacobs (born 1982), South African cricketer

- Debbie Jacobs (born 1955), American disco singer
- Demontrey Jacobs (born 1998), American football player
- Dennis Jacobs (born 1944), American judge
- Denny Jacobs (born 1937), American politician
- Dolly Jacobs (born 1957), American circus aerialist
- Dore Jacobs (June 27, 1894 – March 5, 1979) Teacher of rhythmic education

== E ==
- Edgar P. Jacobs (1904–1987), Belgian comic book writer and artist
- Édouard Jacobs (1851–1925), Belgian cellist
- Elizabeth Jacobs (anthropologist) (1903–1983), American anthropologist
- Elsy Jacobs (1933–1988), Luxembourgish road bicycle racer
- Elmer F. Jacobs (died 1945), American architect
- Ethel D. Jacobs (1910–2001), American racehorse owner/breeder
- Eva E. Jacobs (1921–2015), American statistician

== F ==
- Ferdinand Jacobs (c. 1713–1783), English Hudson's Bay Company officer
- Ferne Jacobs (born 1942), an American fiber artist
- Ferris Jacobs Jr. (1836–1886), American (New York) politician and Union Army general
- Francis Jacobs (born 1939), British jurist
- Franklin Jacobs (born 1957), an American high jumper
- Christian Friedrich Wilhelm Jacobs known as Friedrich Jacobs (1764–1847), German classical scholar

== G ==
- Garry Jacobs (born 1946), American sociologist
- Gary Jacobs (disambiguation), several people, including:

- Gary Jacobs (boxer) (born 1965), Scottish boxer
- Gary Jacobs (solicitor) (c. 1946–2002), British lawyer
- Gary Jacobs (writer) (born 1952), American television comedy writer and producer
- Gary E. Jacobs (born 1962), American businessman and philanthropist

- George Jacobs (disambiguation), several people, including:

- George Jacobs, Sr. (c. 1620–1692), hanged for witchcraft in Salem witch trials
- George Jacobs (inventor) (1877–1945), American inventor
- George Jacobs (basketball) known as "Doc" Jacobs (died 1968), American basketball coach

- Georges Jacobs (born 1940), Belgian businessman
- Gerald Jacobs, British author
- Gidi Jacobs (1935–2016), Dutch football player and manager
- Gillian Jacobs (born 1982), American actress
- Glenn Jacobs (born 1967), American professional wrestler known as "Kane"
- Graeme Jacobs (born 1944), Australian rules footballer

== H ==
- Hannah Jacobs, British illustrator and animator
- Hans Jacobs (1907–1994), German sailplane designer and pioneer
- Harold Jacobs (disambiguation), several people, including:

- Harold M. Jacobs (1912–1995), Jewish and civic leader in New York
- Harold R. Jacobs (born 1939), American author and teacher of mathematics

- Harriet Jacobs (1813–1897), African-American writer and abolitionist
- Harry Jacobs (disambiguation), several people, including:

- Harry Jacobs (American football) (1937–2021), American football player
- Harry Jacobs (Australian footballer) (1913–2000), Australian rules footballer
- Harry Jacobs (conductor) (1888–1988), Australia musician
- Harry Jacobs (tug of war) (fl. 1904), American tug of war athlete
- Harry Allan Jacobs (1872–1932), American architect

- Heidi Hayes Jacobs (born 1948), American educator and businesswoman
- Helen Jacobs (1908–1997), American tennis player ranked world #1
- Helen Sheldon Jacobs Smillie (1854–1926; née Helen Sheldon Jacobs) American painter
- Helene Jacobs (1906–1993), German Resistance member
- Henry Jacobs (disambiguation), several people, including:

- Henry Jacobs (1924–2015), American humorist
- Henry Jacobs (priest) (1824–1901), first Dean of Christchurch, New Zealand
- Henry Jacobs (1924–2015), American sound artist and humorist
- Henry Barton Jacobs (1858–1939), American physician
- Henry Eyster Jacobs (1844–1911), American religious figure and writer
- Henry S. Jacobs (1827–1893), Jamaican-American rabbi

- Herbert Jacobs, (1903–1987), American journalist and inventor of method of crowd measurement
- Hirsch Jacobs (1904–1970), American horse trainer
- Howard Jacobs, American sports lawyer

== I ==
- Irwin M. Jacobs (born 1933), American co-founder of Qualcomm
- Israel Jacobs (1726–1796), colonial Pennsylvania politician

== J ==
- Jack Jacobs (disambiguation), several people, including:

- Jack Jacobs (1919–1974), American and Canadian football player
- Jack Jacobs (cricketer) (1909–2003), New Zealand cricketer
- Jack B. Jacobs, Delaware judge
- Jack H. Jacobs (born 1945), American Medal of Honor recipient

- Jaco Jacobs (born 1980), South African children's book author
- Jacob Jacobs (disambiguation), several people, including:

- Jacob Jacobs (painter) (1812–1879), Belgian painter
- Jacob Jacobs (theater) (1890–1977), Yiddish theater and vaudeville director, producer, etc.

- James Jacobs (disambiguation), several people, including:

- James Jacobs (game designer), American game designer
- James B. Jacobs (1947–2020), American law professor

- Jamie Jacobs, second individual to assume identity of American western hero Phantom Rider
- Jamie Jacobs (footballer) (born 1997), Dutch (soccer) football player
- Jane Jacobs (disambiguation), several people, including:

- Jane Jacobs (1916–2006), American-Canadian urbanist
- Jane Jacobs (baseball) (1924–2015), All-American Girls Professional Baseball League player
- Jane M. Jacobs (born 1958), Australian geographer

- Janet Jacobs (born 1928), All-American Girls Professional Baseball League player
- Janice L. Jacobs (born 1946), American Foreign Service Officer
- Jay Jacobs (disambiguation), several people, including:

- Jay Jacobs (broadcaster) (born 1938), American sports announcer
- Jay Jacobs (businessman) (1911–2013), American founder of Jay Jacobs clothing retailer
- Jay Jacobs (politician) (born 1953), American politician
- Jay Jacobs (athletic director) (born c. 1964), American athletic director

- Jean-Charles Jacobs (1821–1907), Belgian physician and entomologist
- Jerry Jacobs (disambiguation), multiple people
- Jill Jacobs (born 1951), American educator and wife of President Joe Biden
- Jill Jacobs (rabbi) (born 1975), American Conservative rabbi
- Jim Jacobs (born 1942), American composer, lyricist, and writer
- Jim Jacobs (customizer), American hot rodder and customizer
- Jimmy Jacobs (born 1984), American professional wrestler
- Jimmy Jacobs (handballer) (1930–1988), American handball player and boxing manager
- Joan Jacobs Brumberg (born 1944), American social historian
- Jochem Jacobs (born 1977), Dutch guitarist, producer and recording engineer
- Joe Jacobs (American football) (born 1970), American Arena Football league player
- Joe Jacobs (actor) (born 1983), English actor
- Joe Jacobs (speedway rider) (born 1993), British speedway rider
- Joey Jacobs (born 1960), British boxer
- Joey Jacobs Sr. (born 1937), British boxer
- John Jacobs (disambiguation), several people, including:

- John Jacobs (activist) (1947–1997), SDS member and "weatherman"
- John Jacobs (American golfer) (born 1945), American golfer
- John Jacobs (English golfer) (1925–2017), English golfer
- John Jacobs (evangelist) (born 1959), American evangelist and bodybuilder
- John Jacobs (producer), American film and television producer
- John Jacobs (activist) (1947–1997), American student and anti-war activist
- John C. Jacobs (1838–1894), New York politician
- John E. Jacobs (1903–1971), American educator
- John Henry Jacobs (1847–1934), American sandstone industrialist
- John Hornor Jacobs (born 1971), American author

- Johnny Jacobs (1916–1982), American television announcer
- Jon Jacobs (born 1966), British actor and entrepreneur
- Jos Jacobs (born 1953), Belgian road bicycle racer
- Josef Jacobs (1894–1978), German pilot
- Joseph Jacobs (disambiguation), several people, including:

- Joseph Jacobs (1854–1916), Australian-born folklorist, literary critic and historian
- Joseph J. Jacobs (1916–2004), American engineer and businessman
- Joseph Warren Jacobs (1869–1947), American naturalist

- Josh Jacobs (born 1998), American football player
- Julian Jacobs (1937–2025), American judge
- Julian Jacobs (basketball) (born 1994), American basketball player
- June Jacobs, British Jewish peace activist

== K ==
- Karl Jacobs (born 1998), American Youtuber
- Kate Jacobs (born 1959), American singer-songwriter
- Katie Jacobs Stanton (born 1970), American businesswoman, head of international strategy at Twitter
- Keaghan Jacobs (born 1989), South African footballer
- Ken Jacobs (1933–2025), American experimental filmmaker
- Kenneth Jacobs (disambiguation), several people, including:

- Kenneth Jacobs (judge) (1917–2015), Australian judge
- Kenneth M. Jacobs (born c. 1958), American businessman, CEO of Lazard

- Khalil Jacobs (born 2003), American football player
- Klaus Johann Jacobs (1936–2008), German-born Swiss billionaire
- Kristin Jacobs (1959–2020), American politician
- Kyle Jacobs (disambiguation), several people

== L ==
- Lamont Marcell Jacobs, (born 1994), Italian 100 m Olympic Champion
- L. Rowley Jacobs, (c.1823–1890s), itinerant American portrait painter
- Laura Jacobs, American novelist, journalist, and dance critic
- Laura Ann Jacobs, (born 1960) American sculptor and mixed media artist
- Laverne Jacobs, (born 1972), Canadian law professor and disability rights expert
- Lawrence Jacobs (disambiguation), several people
- Leighshe Jacobs (born 1985), South African cricketer
- Leon Jacobs (born 1995), American football player
- Lesedi Sheya Jacobs (born 1997), Namibian tennis player
- Lewis Jacobs (1904–1997), American author, director and publisher
- Liam Jacobs (born 2002), South African politician
- Lily Jacobs (born 1951), Dutch politician
- Lionel M. Jacobs (1840–1922), American businessman and politician
- Lodewijk Jacobs (born 1951), Dutch sprint canoer
- Lohan Jacobs (born 1991), South African rugby player
- Lou Jacobs (1903–1992), American circus clown
- Lou Jacobs (footballer) (1884–1936), Australian rules footballer
- Louis Jacobs (disambiguation), several people, including:
  - Louis Jacobs (1920–2006), British Orthodox rabbi
  - Louis L. Jacobs (born 1948), American vertebrate paleontologist

== M ==
- Manis Jacobs (1782–1839), Dutch-born rabbi in New Orleans
- Marc Jacobs (born 1963), American fashion designer
- Marcell Jacobs (born 1994), Italian athlete
- Margaret Jacobs (artist) (born 1963), Native American artist
- Margaret D. Jacobs (born 1963), American historian
- Maria Jacobs (born 1930), Canadian poet and publisher
- Marie-Josée Jacobs (born 1950), politician from Luxembourg
- Marion Walter Jacobs (Little Walter') (1930–1968), American blues harmonica player
- Mark Jacobs (disambiguation), several people, including:

- Mark Jacobs (game designer), American video game executive

- Martin Jacobs, American politician
- Mary C. Jacobs (1828–1909), American horticulturalist and writer
- Mary Frick Garrett Jacobs (1851–1936), American socialite, philanthropist, and art collector
- Matthew Jacobs (born 1956), British actor and writer for TV
- Matthew Jacobs (rugby union) (born 1985), English-born rugby player
- Maxwell Ralph Jacobs (1905–1979), Australian forester
- Melanie B. Jacobs, American legal scholar and administrator
- Michael Jacobs (disambiguation), several people, including:

- Michael Jacobs (art and travel writer) (1952–2014), travel and arts writer
- Michael Jacobs (producer) (born 1955), American producer and playwright
- Michael Jacobs (footballer) (born 1991), English footballer
- Michael J. Jacobs (born 1952), English photojournalist

- Mike Jacobs (disambiguation), several people, including:

- Mike Jacobs (shortstop) (1877–1949), American baseball player
- Mike Jacobs (boxing) (1880–1953), American boxing promoter
- Mike Jacobs (Illinois politician) (born 1960), American (Illinois) politician
- Mike Jacobs (Georgia politician) (born c. 1976), American (Georgia) politician
- Mike Jacobs (first baseman) (born 1980), American baseball player
Ann Elizabeth Fowler Hodges

== N ==
- Nancy Jacobs (born 1951), American (Maryland) politician
- Nat Jacobs (born 1939), English boxer
- Noel Jacobs (1898–1977), English commander in the Shanghai Volunteer Corps

== O ==
- Olu Jacobs (born 1942), Nigerian actor
- Onno Jacobs (born 1964), Dutch businessman associated with FC Feyenoord
- Oral Jacobs (1911–1995), American politician
- Orange Jacobs (1827–1914), American lawyer, newspaper publisher, and politician
- Otto Jacobs (1889–1955), American baseball catcher

== P ==
- Parker Jacobs (born 1975), American musician and graphic designer
- Patricia Jacobs (1934–2026), British geneticist and academic
- Pattie Ruffner Jacobs (1875–1935), American suffragist
- Paul Jacobs (disambiguation), several people, including:

- Paul Jacobs (ice hockey) (1894–1973), Canadian First Nation hockey player
- Paul Jacobs (activist) (1918–1978), American activist
- Paul Jacobs (Flemish writer) (born 1949), Flemish author
- Paul Jacobs (organist) (born 1977), American organist
- Paul Jacobs (pianist) (1930–1983), American pianist
- Paul E. Jacobs (born 1962), American Chief Executive Officer of Qualcomm
- Paul Emil Jacobs (1802–1866), German painter
- Paul Jacobs (composer) (born 1950), American composer and musician

- Pete Jacobs (disambiguation), several people, including:

- Pete Jacobs (musician) (1899–c.1952), American jazz drummer
- Pete Jacobs (triathlete) (born 1981), Australian triathlete

- Peter Jacobs (disambiguation), several people, including:

- Peter Jacobs (fencer) (born 1938), British Olympic fencer
- Peter Jacobs (lacrosse) (born 1973), American lacrosse player

- Petrus Jacobs (1910–1967), South African military commander
- Pieter Jacobs (born 1986), Belgian road bicycle racer
- Pim Jacobs (1934–1996), Dutch jazz pianist and television presenter

== Q ==
- Quinton Jacobs (born 1979), Namibian footballer

== R ==
- Regina Jacobs (born 1963), American middle-distance runner
- René Jacobs (born 1946), Belgian conductor and countertenor
- Sir Roland Ellis Jacobs (1891–1981), South Australian businessman
- Rich Jacobs (born 1972), American artist
- Richard Jacobs (disambiguation), several people, including:

- Richard Jacobs (businessman) (1925–2009), American businessman
- Richard Jacobs (rabbi) (born 1956), American Reform rabbi

- Rick Jacobs, founder and chair of the Courage Campaign
- Ridley Jacobs (born 1967), Antiguan cricketer
- Rob Jacobs (born 1943), Dutch football player and manager
- Robert Nelson Jacobs (born 1954), American screenwriter
- Rodger Jacobs (1959–2016), American writer
- Ron Jacobs (disambiguation), several people, including:

- Ron Jacobs (rugby union) (1928–2002), English rugby player
- Ron Jacobs (broadcaster) (1937–2016), American broadcaster
- Ron Jacobs (basketball) (1942–2015), American basketball coach

- Rusty Jacobs (born 1967), American film actor

== S ==
- Sam Jacobs (bishop) (born 1938), American Roman Catholic bishop
- Sam Jacobs (footballer) (born 1988), Australian rules footballer
- Sam Jacobs (judge) (1920–2011), Justice of the Supreme Court of South Australia
- S. J. Jacobs, Samuel Joshua Jacobs (1853–1937), South Australian businessman
- Samuel Jacobs (disambiguation), several people, including:

- Samuel William Jacobs (1871–1938), Canadian lawyer and politician

- Samantha Jacobs, American politician
- Sarah S. Jacobs (1813–1902), American writer and civic worker
- Sheek Louch (born Sean Divine Jacobs 1976), American rapper
- Sherelle Jacobs, British journalist
- Silveria Jacobs (born 1968), Prime Minister of Sint Maarten
- Simeon Jacobs (1839–1885), South African judge
- Simmone Jacobs (born 1966), British sprinter
- Solomon Jacobs (1861–1920), English rabbi
- Steve Jacobs (born 1967), Australian actor
- Steven Jacobs (disambiguation), several people, including:
  - Steven Jacobs (television presenter) (born 1967), Australian television presenter and actor
  - Steven Jacobs (footballer) (born 1987), Belgian footballer
  - Steven L. Jacobs (born 1947), American historian
- Stu Jacobs (born 1965), New Zealand footballer
- Susan S. Jacobs (born c. 1945), American diplomat and children's rights activist

== T ==
- Tanja Jacobs, Canadian actor and director
- Thomas Jacobs (disambiguation), several people, including:
  - Thomas M. Jacobs (1926–2014), American Nordic skier
- Thornwell Jacobs (1877–1956), American educator, author, and Presbyterian minister.
- Tim Jacobs (ice hockey) (born 1952), Canadian ice hockey player
- Tommy Jacobs (1935–2022), American golfer
- Tramain Jacobs (born 1992), American football player
- Trevor Jacobs (1946–2014), English footballer

== V ==
- Vandrevius Jacobs (born 2004), American football player

== W ==
- W. W. Jacobs (1863–1943), English author
- Walter Jacobs (1930–1968), American blues harmonica player
- Walter Abraham Jacobs (1883–1967), American chemist
- Wayne Jacobs (born 1969), English footballer and football coach
- Werner Jacobs (1909–1999), German film director
- Wil Jacobs (born 1960), Dutch handball player
- Wilfred Jacobs (1919–1995), Governor-General of Antigua and Barbuda
- William Jacobs (disambiguation), several people, including:
  - William H. Jacobs (1831–1882), German-born American legislator and banker
- Wilson Jacobs (1815–1895), American businessman and co-founder of the Stock Exchange of Buenos Aires in 1854.

== Y ==
- Yehudah Jacobs (c. 1940–2020), American rabbi and mashgiach ruchani in Beth Medrash Govoha

== Z ==
- Zina Jacobs (1821–1901), American Mormon pioneer

== See also ==
- Justice Jacobs (disambiguation)
