= Jacob Michael =

Jacob Michael may refer to:

- Jacob Edwin Michael (1848-1895), collegiate football player in the first game and Maryland doctor

== Other names ==
- Jacob Michael Diebler (b. 1986), American basketball coach and former player
- Jacob Michael Italiano (b. 1991), Australian soccer player
- Jacob Michael Kunkel (1822-1870), American Congressman from Maryland
- Jacob Michael Rudock (b. 1993), American former professional football player
- Jacob Michael Whitesides (b. 1997), American singer
- Jacob Michael Williams (b. 1991), American wheelchair basketball player
- Jacob Michael Young (b. 1997), American basketball player

== See also ==
- Michael Jacob (b. 1980), Irish hurler
- Michael Jacobs
- Mike Jacobs (disambiguation)
