= George Jacobs =

George Jacobs may refer to:

- George Jacobs (inventor) (1877–1945), American inventor
- George Jacobs, Sr. (died 1692), hanged for witchcraft in Salem witch trials
- George Jacobs, Jr., accused of witchcraft in Salem witch trials, but fled
- George Jacobs (basketball), American basketball coach
- George Jacobs (valet) (1927–2013), memoirist and valet of Frank Sinatra
- George Jacobs (bridge player), American bridge player
- George Jacobs (educator) (born 1952), American educator and vegan activist
- George Jacobs (rabbi) (1834–1884), Jamaican-American rabbi
