= David Jacobs =

David or Davy Jacobs may refer to:

- David Jacobs (broadcaster) (1926–2013), BBC radio and television presenter and actor
- David Jacobs (cricketer, born 1989), South African cricketer
- David Jacobs (gymnast) (born 1942), American gymnast
- David Jacobs (Ontario politician), Canadian lawyer and politician
- David Jacobs (sociologist), American sociologist
- David Jacobs (steroid dealer) (c. 1973–2008), American personal trainer, convicted steroid dealer and informant, son of David Jacobs (gymnast)
- David Jacobs (table tennis) (1977–2023), Paralympic competitor from Indonesia
- David Jacobs (Welsh athlete) (1888–1976), Olympic gold-medallist from Wales
- David Jacobs (writer) (1939–2023), American creator/writer of the television series Dallas and Knots Landing
- David Anthony Jacobs, Baron Jacobs (1931–2014), British businessman and Liberal Democrat politician
- David M. Jacobs (born 1942), American UFO and abduction phenomenon researcher
- Davy Jacobs (born 1982), South African cricketer

== See also ==
- David Jacob Eisenhower (1863–1942), father of United States President Dwight D. Eisenhower
