= Andrew Jacobs =

Andrew Jacobs may refer to:

- Andrew Jacobs (journalist), American reporter, documentary film director, and producer
- Andrew Jacobs Jr. (1932–2013), American lawyer and politician from Indiana
- Andrew Jacobs Sr. (1906–1992), American lawyer, judge, and politician from Indiana
- Andy Jacobs (born 1952), British sports personality

== See also ==
- Andrew Jacobson, American soccer player
