= Harold Jacobs =

Harold Jacobs may refer to:

- Harold M. Jacobs (1912–1995), Jewish and civic leader who headed a number of American Jewish organizations and institutions; also played a significant role in New York City educational affairs
- Harold R. Jacobs (born 1939), authored three widely used mathematics books, both taught the subject and taught those who teach it
