= Michael Jacobs =

Michael Jacobs may refer to:

- Michael A. Jacobs (1860–1936), American businessman and politician
- Michael J. Jacobs (born 1952), English photojournalist
- Michael Jacobs (footballer) (born 1991), English footballer
- Michael Jacobs (art and travel writer) (1952–2014)
- Michael Jacobs (economist) (born 1960), British economist
- Michael Jacobs (physician) (born 1964), British medical consultant in infectious diseases
- Michael Jacobs (activist), Dutch activist
- Michael Jacobs (producer), American television producer

== See also ==
- Mike Jacobs (disambiguation)
- Michael Jacob (born 1980), Irish hurling player
