= Rea Magnet Wire Company =

Coordinates: 41°3′40″N 85°5′30.8″W

- Type: Private
- Industry: Copper Mining
- Founded: 1933
- Headquarters: Fort Wayne, Indiana, United States
- Key people: Chris Billingsley, President & CEO
- Number of employees: 800
- Website: www.reawire.com

Rea Magnet Wire Company, Inc. is one of the world's largest manufacturers of magnet and nonferrous wire products. Rea produces copper, aluminum and brass-insulated magnet wire and bare wire used in the manufacture of motors, transformers and coils. Rea also manufactures a number of specialty wire products.

== Magnet wire industry ==
Until George Jacobs invented a practical enamel for the purpose, cloth was used to insulate magnet wire. This had a number of drawbacks, such as the cloth being too expensive, becoming worn, and bulky. Wire with enamel insulation could be more densely packed, allowing smaller, more efficient motors, coils and other electromagnetic devices.

Jacobs had worked as a chemist in GE's Fort Wayne, Indiana plant. In fact, he met and married his wife Ethel when he worked there. He got a better job as a chemist with Sherwin-Williams in Cleveland, Ohio but continued to work privately on an enamel wire insulation. He tried to exploit his invention there, but lack of capital and management skills hampered him. His father-in-law, successful Fort Wayne hardware wholesaler W.E. Mossman, was a lonely widower. He agreed to back Jacobs with capital, if he would move to Fort Wayne. Once there, Ethel's brother, P. Paul Mossman, provided additional management skills.

Jacobs built a plant on Wall Street in Fort Wayne, Indiana in 1912. By 1922, Dudlo Wire was the largest magnet wire manufacturer in the country—but by 1927, the owners were concerned about the financial health of the country. They sold out to a conglomerate, General Cable Corporation, in 1927, with the Great Depression beginning in 1929. George Jacobs left Dudlo in 1928 to form a new company, Inca Manufacturing, that later became Phelps Dodge Magnet Wire. Victor Rea became manager of Dudlo.

A photo of Victor Rea.

== Rea strikes out on his own ==
The new owners closed the Fort Wayne offices in 1930. In 1933, shortly before the manufacturing facilities were moved to Rome, New York, Victor Rea resigned and started his own company, Rea Magnet Wire, with several other former Dudlo employees. It was difficult to get a company off the ground in 1933, but an order by Jefferson Electric started the ball rolling, and the company quickly developed a reputation. Victor Rea died of a heart attack in 1954, thus Samuel Rea (his son), became the new president.

On January 18, 1960, Rea Magnet Wire was purchased by Alcoa. Sales manager Robert L. "Bob" Whearley—another Dudlo employee—was named President in late 1960 when brothers Samuel and David Rea left the company. Jim Vann, who had been president of Rea since 1982, joined with several others to buy Rea Magnet Wire from Alcoa. It remains a private corporation today.

== Recent growth ==
Rea Magnet Wire, Inc. purchased Phelps Dodge Magnet Wire Company North America on February 14, 2006. This was a major acquisition, adding about 600 more employees to their North American payroll of 675. This brings Rea to eight manufacturing locations in North America, with a second plant in Fort Wayne, Indiana, and a manufacturing plant in Monterrey, Mexico, as well as manufacturing in Lafayette, Indiana, Las Cruces, New Mexico, Guilford, Connecticut, Ashland, Virginia, and Osceola, Arkansas. As a joint venture with Tongling Jingda, Rea built magnet wire factories in China in 2002 and 2004, expanding the earlier plant in 2005.

Phelps Dodge has been restructuring to focus on mining operations. In March, 2006, they sold Phelps Dodge High Performance Conductors and Columbian Chemicals Company. In March, 2007, Phelps Dodge Corporation was acquired by Freeport-McMoRan Copper & Gold Inc. which is now the world's largest publicly traded copper producer, and a leading producer of molybdenum and cobalt.
