= Daniel Jacobs =

Daniel, Dan, or Danny Jacobs may refer to:

- Dan Jacobs (trumpeter) (born 1942), jazz musician
- Dan Jacobs, lead guitarist of the band Atreyu
- Danie Jacobs (1904-1999), South African Olympic athlete
- Daniel Jacobs (boxer) (born 1987), American professional boxer
- Danny Jacobs (actor) (born 1968), American actor and comedian
- Danny Jacobs (footballer) (born 1980), former Australian rules footballer

== See also ==
- Danny Jacob (born 1956), American composer, songwriter and guitarist
