= James Jacobs =

James, Jim, Jimmy or Jamie Jacobs may refer to:

== People ==
- James B. Jacobs (born 1947), American legal scholar and law professor
- James Jacobs (game designer) (born 1972), American author and designer of role-playing games
- Jamie Jacobs (footballer) (born 1997), Dutch football player
- Jim Jacobs (born 1942), American musical theatre writer, composer, lyricist and actor
- Jim Jacobs (customizer), American hot rodder and customizer
- Jimmy Jacobs (born 1984), stage name of American wrestler
- Jimmy Jacobs (handballer) (1930–1988), American handball player and boxing manager

== Fictional character ==
- Jamie Jacobs, the second Phantom Rider

== See also ==
- Jacobs (surname)
