= Peter Jacobs =

Peter or Pete Jacobs may refer to:

- Peter Jacobs (fencer) (born 1938), British fencer
- Peter Jacobs (lacrosse) (born 1973), former lacrosse player
- Peter Jacobs (landscape architect) (born 1939), Canadian landscape architect
- Pete Jacobs (musician) (1899–c. 1952), American jazz drummer
- Peter Jacobs (pianist) (born 1945), English pianist
- Pete Jacobs (triathlete) (born 1981), Australian triathlete

== See also ==
- Pieter Jacobs (born 1986), Belgian cyclist
- Pieter Jacobs (playwright) (born 1980), South African playwright
