= Gary Jacobs =

Gary Jacobs may refer to:

- Gary Jacobs (solicitor) (c. 1946–2002), British solicitor
- Gary Jacobs (writer), American television comedy writer and producer
- Gary Jacobs (boxer) (born 1965), former Scottish boxer
- Gary E. Jacobs (born 1962), American businessman, philanthropist and minority owner in the Sacramento Kings
