= Paul Jacobs =

Paul Jacobs may refer to:

- Paul Emil Jacobs (1802–1866), German painter
- Paul E. Jacobs (born 1962), former executive chairman of Qualcomm
- Paul Jacobs (pianist) (1930–1983), American pianist
- Paul Jacobs (Flemish writer) (born 1949), Flemish author
- Paul Jacobs (organist) (born 1977), American organist
- Paul Jacobs (politician), American politician
- Paul Jacobs (activist) (1918–1978), American activist
  - Paul Jacobs and the Nuclear Gang, documentary film about the above
- Paul Jacobs (U.S. Navy officer) (1936–2020), captain of the USS Kirk
- Paul Jacobs (composer), American songwriter
- Paul Jacobs (ice hockey) (1894–1973), Canadian ice hockey player

== See also ==
- Paul Jacob (born 1960), activist
