= Bruce Jacobs =

Bruce Jacobs may refer to:

- Bruce Jacobs (radio host) (born 1964), American sports talk radio show host
- Bruce Jacobs (field hockey) (born 1975), South African field hockey player
- J. Bruce Jacobs (1943–2019), American-born Australian academic

== See also ==
- Bruce Jacob (born 1935), American attorney
