= Ben Jacobs =

Ben Jacobs may refer to:

- Ben Jacobs (rugby union) (born 1982), Australian rugby union player
- Ben Jacobs (American football) (born 1988), American football linebacker and coach
- Ben Jacobs (Australian rules footballer) (born 1992), Australian rules footballer
- Ben Jacobs (journalist), American journalist
- Benjamin R. Jacobs (1879–1963), American chemist
- Benjamin Jacobs (dentist) (1919–2004), dentist who survived Auschwitz
- Max Tundra, the alias of British electronic musician Ben Jacobs (born 1974)

== See also ==
- Benjamin Jacob (1778–1829), English organist, conductor, and composer
