= Arthur Jacobs (disambiguation) =

Arthur Jacobs (1922–1996) was an English music critic and musicologist.

Arthur Jacobs may also refer to:

- Arthur P. Jacobs (1922–1973), film producer
- Arthur I. Jacobs, drill-chuck innovator
- Art Jacobs (1902–1967), pitcher in Major League Baseball
- Bert Jacobs (cricketer) (1866–1948), New Zealand cricketer, born Arthur Jacobs
