= Steven Jacobs =

Steven Jacobs may refer to:

- Steven Jacobs (television presenter) (born 1967), Australian television presenter
- Steven Jacobs (cricketer) (born 1988), Guyanese cricketer
- Steven Jacobs (footballer) (born 1987), Belgian footballer
- Steve Jacobs (footballer) (born 1961), English footballer
- Steven L. Jacobs (born 1947), American historian
- Steve Jacobs (decathlete) (born 1956), American decathlete, 1979 NCAA runner-up for the Arizona Wildcats track and field team

== See also ==
- Steve Jacobs (born 1967), Australian actor
- Steven Jacob (born 1966), American politician
