= Paul Hawksbee =

British sports radio presenter and comedy writer

- Born: Paul Hawksbee; 1 October 1961 (age 64); England
- Occupations: Broadcaster; comedy writer
- Years active: 1990s–present
- Notable work: Talksport; Harry Hill's TV Burp; 90 Minutes

Paul Hawksbee (born 1 October 1961) is an English sports radio presenter and comedy writer. He has presented the Hawksbee and Jacobs show alongside Andy Jacobs on Talksport since the station's inception in 2000.

He also contributed to the writing of ITV's Harry Hill's TV Burp, Al Murray's Happy Hour, and the original Spitting Image.

Hawksbee co-founded the weekly football magazine 90 Minutes.

== Personal life ==
Hawksbee is a Tottenham Hotspur fan.
