= Jane Jacobs (disambiguation) =

Jane Jacobs (1916–2006) was an American-Canadian journalist and writer on urban planning.

Jane Jacobs may also refer to:

- Jane Jacobs (baseball) (1924–2015), American baseball player
- Jane M. Jacobs (born 1958), Australian cultural geographer and academic

== See also ==
- Jacobs (surname)
- Jacobs (disambiguation)
