= Thomas Jacob =

Thomas Jacob may refer to:

- Thomas Jacob (designer) (born 1984), Italian fashion designer
- Thomas Jacob (journalist), Malayalam journalist
- Thomas Jacob (luger) (born 1965), East German luger
- Thomas Jacob (MP) (c. 1653–1730), Member of Parliament for Wootton Basset, 1695–1698

== See also ==
- Thomas Jacobs (disambiguation)
