= Samuel Jacobs =

Samuel or Sam Jacobs may refer to:

- Sam Jacobs (basketball), American basketball player
- Sam Jacobs (bishop) (born 1938), American prelate of the Roman Catholic Church
- Sam Jacobs (footballer) (born 1988), Australian rules footballer
- Sam Jacobs (judge) (1920–2011), Justice of the Supreme Court of South Australia
- Samuel Jacobs (journalist), American journalist and editor
- S. J. Jacobs (Samuel Joshua Jacobs, 1853–1937), South Australian lawyer, businessman and sportsman
- Sam Boardman-Jacobs (born 1942), Welsh playwright and director
- Samuel William Jacobs (1871–1938), Canadian lawyer and politician
