= Joseph Warren Jacobs =

American naturalist

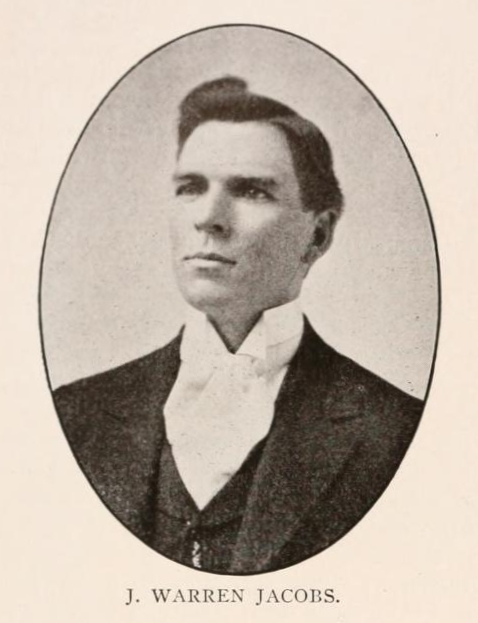

Joseph Warren Jacobs (December 5, 1869 – February 27, 1947) was an American artist and naturalist. He initially worked as a sign painter but was also an oologist and ornithologist who set up a private natural history museum. He later established, Jacobs Bird-house Company, a company that sold ornate nest-boxes for purple martins.

== Life and work ==
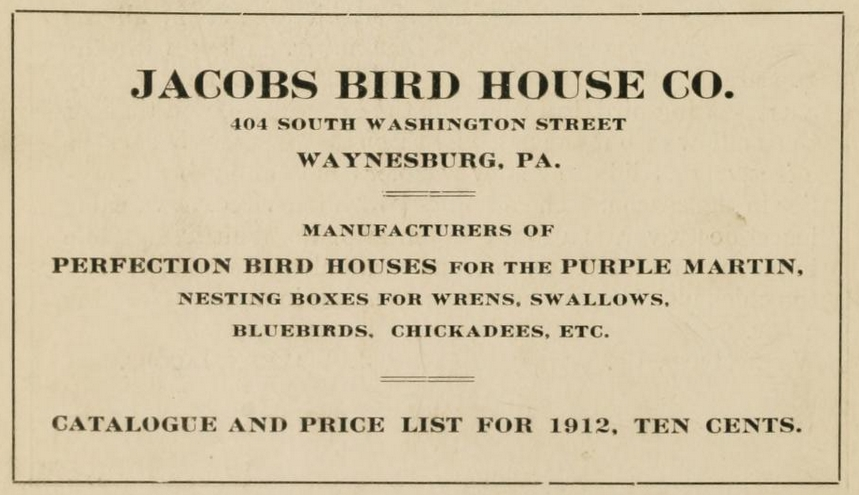
Advertisement, 1912

Jacobs was born in Smith Creek, Greene County, Pennsylvania, the eighth of ten children of blacksmith and wagon-maker Henry and Eleanor Kent Jacobs. He travelled with his father on work involving the repairs of buggies and wagons. Jacobs went to school until the sixth grade and was interested in nature and also in art. He worked with pen and ink and became widely known for his calligraphic work, writing family histories into family Bibles. It was on an such an assignment for a Waynesburg grocer, Jasper Dulany that he met their daughter Emma whom he married in 1897. His collections of natural history specimens led to the creation of a private museum, the Jacobs Museum of Applied Oology. He exhibited his egg collections and won a gold medal at the St. Louis Exposition, 1904. He built an artificial housing for purple martins which occupied them in growing numbers over the years. This attracted many people who sought to replicate it and he founded the Jacobs Bird-house Company which sold nest boxes for fifty years. The nest boxes were ornate and included porches, railings and multi-storyed designs. They were popularized by Henry Ford and William Rockefeller among others. He believed that house sparrows were competing with and driving out purple martins. He also sold sparrow traps. The company closed down after his death.

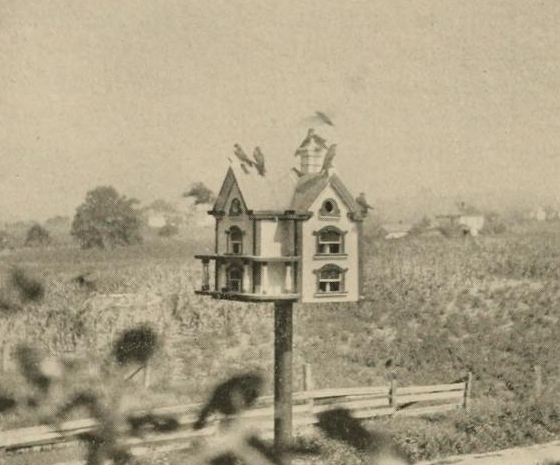
A nest house

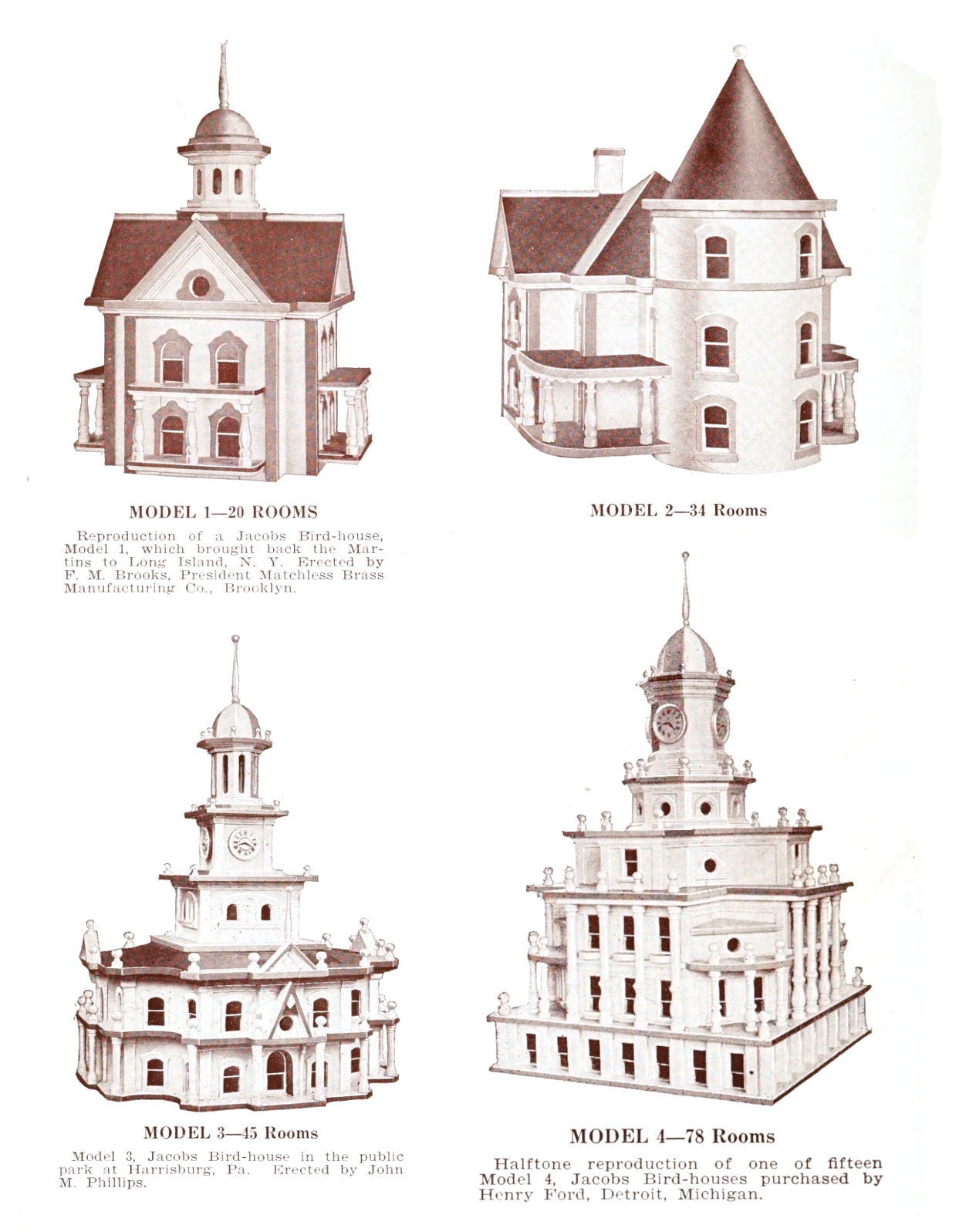
Some designs

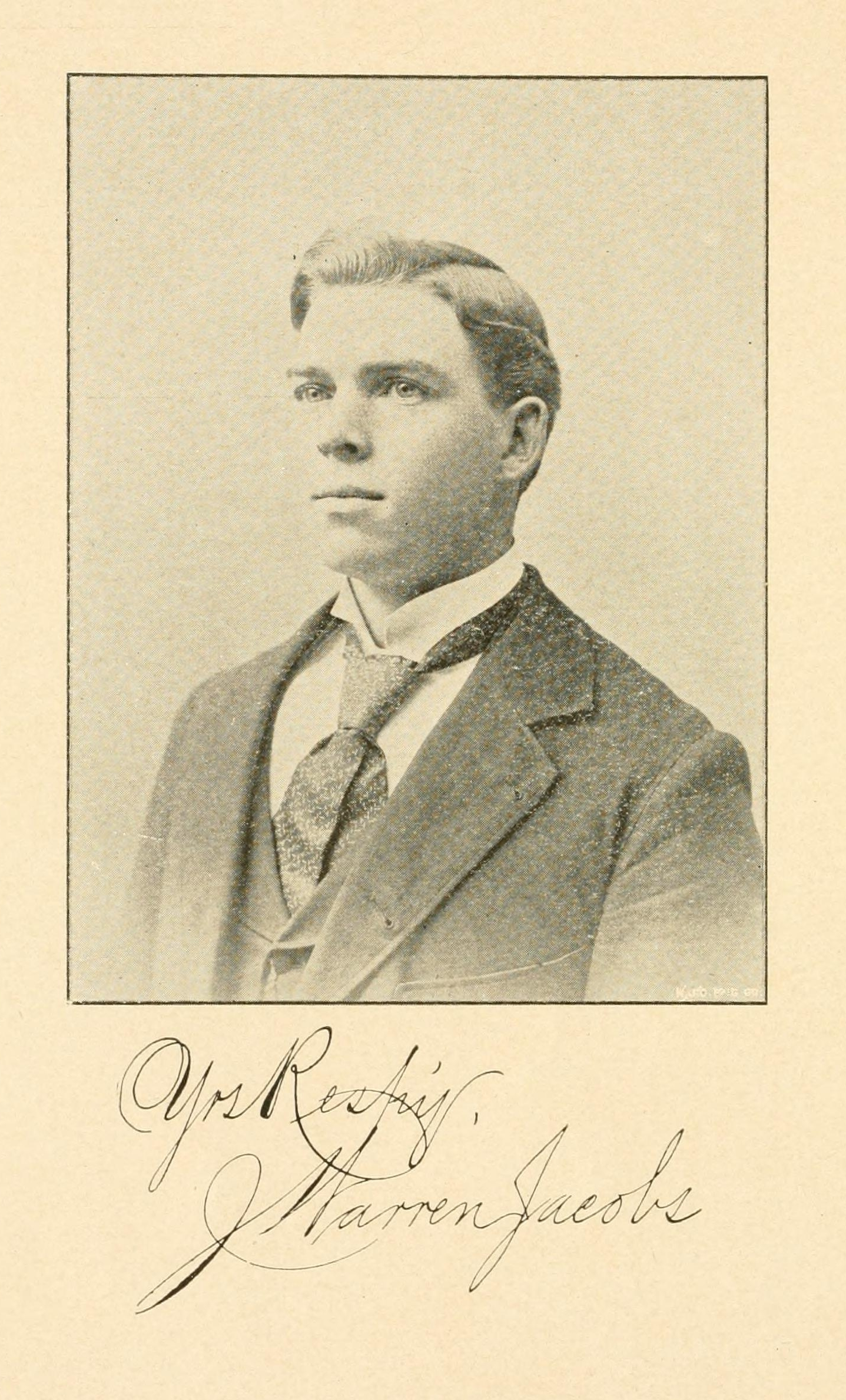
In 1895

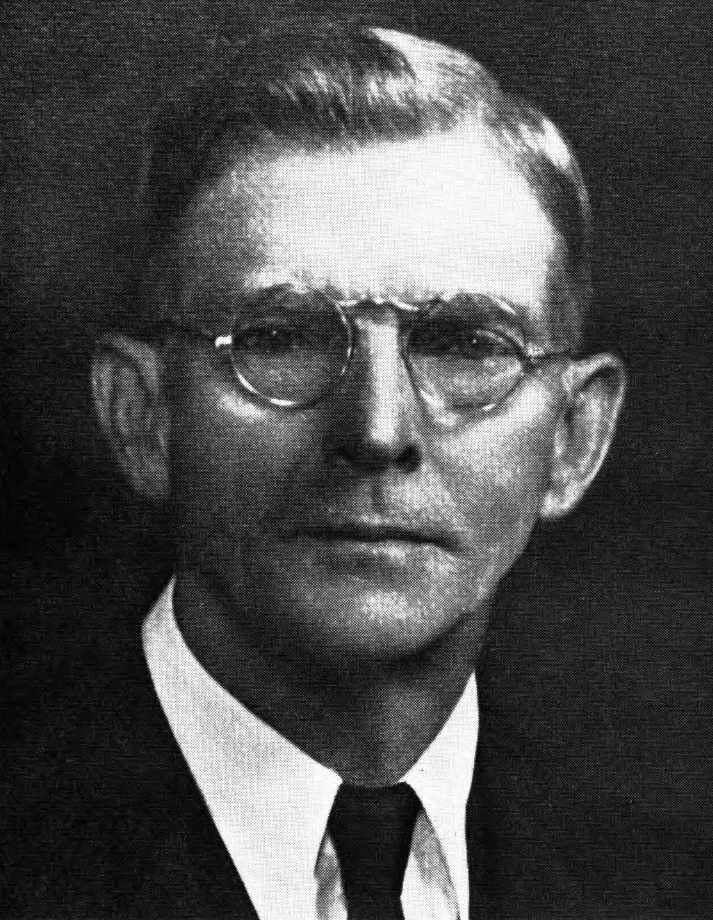
In 1942
