= Michael Jacobs (activist) =

Dutch activist & politician

Michael Jacobs is a pro-Israel activist living in the Netherlands. He gained attention in the Dutch Jewish community for demonstrating against anti-Israel movements.

In September 2016, he was controversially arrested for disturbing public order, after which he spent six days in jail after refusing to stop picketing in Dam Square in Amsterdam. Prosecutors later dropped charges against him after complaints from Amsterdam's Jewish community.

According to the Jewish Daily Forward, he has been responsible for “ending [the] monopoly” enjoyed by anti-Israel activists on the "street-level Israel debate”.
