= Lou Jacobs (footballer) =

Australian rules footballer

Personal information
- Full name: Louis Jacobs
- Born: 16 December 1884; Prahran, Victoria
- Died: 21 December 1936 (aged 52); Sydney, New South Wales
- Height: 178 cm (5 ft 10 in)

Playing career^{1}
Years	Club	Games (Goals)
1906	Fitzroy	1 (2)
- ^{1} Playing statistics correct to the end of 1906.

Louis Jacobs (16 December 1884 – 21 December 1936) was an Australian rules footballer who played with Fitzroy in the Victorian Football League (VFL).
