= Lawrence Jacobs =

Lawrence Jacobs may refer to:

- Lawrence Jacobs (lawyer), American lawyer and businessman
- Lawrence Hilton Jacobs, American actor and singer
- Lawrence R. Jacobs, American political scientist
