= Jerry Jacobs =

Jerry Jacobs may refer to:

- Jerry Jacobs Jr. (born 1962), American businessman
- Jerry A. Jacobs (born 1955), American sociologist
- Jerry Jacobs (American football) (born 1997), American football player
