= Anja Jacobs =

German Film director (born 1974)

- Born: 1974 (age 50–51); Itzehoe, Germany
- Occupation: Film director
- Years active: 2001 - present

Anja Jacobs (born 1974 in Itzehoe) is a German Film director.

== Life and work ==
In 1998 Anja Jacobs began to study Film direction at the Filmakademie Baden-Württemberg in Ludwigsburg. She finished her study in 2003 with the diploma- and short film Wolf's Ravine. After her study Anja Jacobs realized a few TV movies and series.

Anja Jacobs lives in Berlin.

== Filmography (selection) ==
- 2001: Dr. Cuddle (Kuscheldoktor), (short film)
- 2003: Wolf's Ravine (Wolfsschlucht), (short film)
- 2006: Zores (TV movie)
- 2007: Verrückt nach Clara (TV series), (Two Episodes)
- 2008: Cinderella for a Night (Küss mich, wenn es Liebe ist), (TV movie)
- 2011: Someone Like Him (Einer wie Bruno)

== Awards and nominations ==
- 2001: Short award for Dr. Cuddle at the AFI Fest
- 2003: Nomination for Dr. Cuddle at the Student Academy Awards
