= Kyle Jacobs =

Kyle Jacobs may refer to:

- Kyle Jacobs (songwriter) (1973–2023), American country music songwriter, vocalist, guitarist and pianist
- Kyle Jacobs (footballer, born 1986), English footballer
- Kyle Jacobs (soccer, born 1991), South African footballer
- Kyle Jacobs (cricketer) (born 1998), South African cricketer
