= Kenneth Jacobs =

Kenneth Jacobs may refer to:

- Sir Kenneth Jacobs (judge) (1917–2015), Australian judge and justice of the High Court of Australia
- Kenneth M. Jacobs (born 1958), chairman and CEO of Lazard Ltd
- Ken Jacobs (1933–2025), American filmmaker
- Kenneth Jacobs (politician) (born 1959), member of the National Assembly of South Africa since 2019
