= Laura Ann Jacobs =

American mixed media artist and sculptor (born 1960)

- Born: March 1, 1960 (age 66); Baltimore
- Occupations: sculptor, mixed media artist
- Notable work: Contemporary, Modern
- Style: Contemporary
- Website: www.lauraannjacobs.com

Laura Ann Jacobs (born March 1, 1960, in Baltimore) is an American mixed media artist and sculptor.

Jacobs is most recognized for her mixed media series that critically addresses issues of gender identity. In her humorous yet complex ensembles, she touches on the inclination of women to succumb to society's dictates and the tragedy hidden behind the "desire to be desired". Found objects like smashed glass, broken mirrors or objects from the sea are transformed into sculptures resembling animated foundation garments, corsets, bra's and shoes. Combining both elements of sexuality and comedy, her series provokes questions on the perception and image of women in society. Her work reflects a critical response to how the aesthetics influenced by the modern porn-industry and plastic surgery have created a dual and circus-like image of female bodies and sexuality.

Jacobs graduated from San Francisco State University and attended post graduate studies at the Academy of Art University and California College of Arts and Crafts. She lives and works in San Francisco and Palm Beach, FL.

Sculpture, "The Breast of Two Whorls"

== Recent exhibitions ==
2016 ANEW Museum Galleries "Laura Ann Jacobs" Fort Lauderdale, FL
2015 Nina Torres Gallery "Art Fusion" Miami, FL
2014 Sculpt Miami "Laura Ann Jacobs" Miami, FL
2013 Kavachnina Gallery "Art Basel Vernassage" Miami, FL
2012 Bosi Contemporary "Eros and Thanatos" N.Y. New York
2010 Hal Katzen "Bound to Beauty " N.Y. New York
2007 Mark Miller "Yes Dear" N.Y.C.
2005 The Hart Gallery, Carmel, California
2005 Karen Lynne Gallery, Boca Raton, Florida
