= Chris Jacobs =

Christopher or Chris Jacobs may refer to:

- Chris Jacobs (Family Affairs), a character in TV soap opera Family Affairs
- Chris Jacobs (politician) (born 1966), Republican politician from New York
- Chris Jacobs (swimmer) (born 1964), American Olympic medalist in the sport of swimming
- Chris Jacobs (television host) (born 1970), co-host of Discovery Channel television show Overhaulin

== See also ==
- Cris Jacobs, American singer-songwriter
