= Thomas Jacobs =

Thomas Jacobs may refer to:

- Thomas M. Jacobs (1926–2014), American Olympic Nordic skier
- Tommy Jacobs (born 1935), American golfer

== See also ==
- Thomas Jacob (disambiguation)
