= Jacob Jacobs =

Jacob or Jake Jacobs may refer to:

- Jacob Jacobs (artist) (1812–1879), Belgian landscape and orientalist painter
- Jacob Jacobs (theater) (1890–1977), Hungarian-born American Yiddish theater producer, actor and songwriter
- Jake Jacobs (1937–2010), American baseball player
