= Onno Jacobs =

Dutch businessman

Onno Jacobs (born 1964, Bleiswijk) is a Dutch business man and former Director Finance and Operations of Feyenoord Rotterdam. In January 2016, he was appointed as Interim Director of FC Twente.

== Information ==
He was appointed in August 2005, as the replacement of Jan Willem van Dop. Prior to his spell at Feyenoord Jacobs was director Finance and IT at CSM/PURAC, a company with over 300 million euros revenue. Jacobs supported Feyenoord since he was a kid and is one of the founders of the Feyenoord talent pools that helped the club to restructure after chairman Jorien van den Herik was forced to resign in December 2006.

Lately Jacobs was criticized by many Feyenoord supporters for not being able to solve the financial problems of the club. Many say Jacobs is a part of the problem and even made the situation worse by bad financial management. Jacobs announced that he will leave Feyenoord at the end of 2011.
