= Noel Jacobs =

Noel S. Jacobs (1898–1977) was the first and only commander of the Jewish Company of the Shanghai Volunteer Corps.

Born in England to a Methodist family, he grew up in Hong Kong. He was a founder-member of the first Boy Scout Troop to be formed in the city. He later served with the Hong Kong Defence Force before moving in the early 1920s to Shanghai, where he was employed by the British-American Tobacco Company. In Shanghai he met a young Russian-Jewish girl, Dora Bogomolsky, whom he married after converting to Judaism.

Jacobs took over the 5th Shanghai (Jewish) Boy Scout Troop as Scoutmaster in 1923. Under his leadership, the troop flourished and was successfully competitive with the other Scout troops in Shanghai. In the summer of 1932, a group of young Jews in Shanghai, some of them former Scouts as well as members of the Shanghai branch of Betar, met at an obscure address on Bubbling Well Road to consider the possibility of forming a Jewish unit in the Shanghai Volunteer Corps.

In September 1932, following hostilities with the Japanese, a Jewish platoon became a respected unit of the Shanghai Volunteer Corps. It was commanded by Captain Noel S. Jacobs. The chaplain of the Jewish Company was Reverend Mendel Brown, who was the spiritual leader of the Sephardic community in Shanghai. The platoon expanded on 23 May 1933 to become the all-Jewish Hebrew Company under Jacob's command. The majority of its members were Russian Jews. The Jewish Company wore on the uniform collar metal Magen David ornaments with the letters "SVC" superimposed. One of their undeclared aims was to acquire military experience for eventual participation in the fight for Jewish independence in Palestine.

When the fighting in the Chinese section of Shanghai in 1937 threatened to spill over into the Settlement, the foreign units took up their assigned defensive positions, and the Shanghai Volunteer Corps was mobilized on 17 August, as was the Jewish Company, for a period of three months, taking up predesignated stations. For thus period of active service, 85 members of the company were awarded the Municipal Council's Emergency medal.

Major Jacobs were interned until the end of the war. His wife and three daughters had earlier been evacuated to the United States. In 1949, Jacobs left China to return to England to continue working for the British-American Tobacco Company. He retired in 1956 and he and his family finally settled down in New Milton, England. In 1967, his former Scouts and members of the Jewish Company who had emigrated to Israel sponsored a trip to Israel for Noel and Dora Jacobs. Reportedly, it was an extremely emotional and happy reunion. He died in England in 1977 at the age of 79; his wife a few years later.

To honor their former Scoutmaster and Commander of the Jewish Company, volunteers and friends the world over sponsored a memorial forest in Modi'in-Maccabim-Re'ut, Israel, in his name. A stone marker was unveiled on 18 May 1980 in the presence of a group of these admirers, who had 3,500 trees planted to commemorate the life of Noel Jacobs.
