= Nat Jacobs =

English boxer (1939–2021)

Personal information
- Born: Nathaniel J. S. Jacobs; 1 December 1939 Manchester, England
- Died: 19 March 2021 Manchester, England
- Weight: Welterweight; light-middleweight; Middleweight; Light-heavyweight

Boxing career
- Stance: Orthodox

Boxing record
- Total fights: 56
- Wins: 28
- Win by KO: 2
- Losses: 26
- Draws: 2

Nathaniel "Nat" J. S. Jacobs (1 December 1939 – 19 March 2021) was an English amateur and professional boxer of the 1950s, 1960s and 1970s, who won the Central (England) Area middleweight title and challenged for the British Boxing Board of Control British middleweight title. His professional fighting weight varied from 145.5 lb (66.0 kg; 10 st 5.5 lb), i.e. welterweight, through light middleweight and middleweight, to 163.5 lb (74.2 kg; 11 st 9.5 lb), i.e. light heavyweight. He was managed/trained by former boxer Stan Skinkiss.

== Boxing career ==
Born in Manchester, Jacobs began his professional career in November 1960 with a points victory over Sunny Osemegie, and went on to win his first six pro fights. He suffered his first defeat by George Palin in February 1961 after a fourth round disqualification. After two further victories he faced Palin again in June 1961, the fight this time ending in a draw. After a defeat by Eddie Phillips he faced Palin again in January 1962, winning by a third-round knockout. The six fights that followed in 1962 all ended in defeat, but his fortunes improved in 1963 with three straight wins, starting with a points victory over Jimmy Gibson. He had a mixed record during the remainder of 1963 and 1964, including losing a BBofC Central Area Middleweight Title eliminator to Jackie Harwood, and after a defeat by Johnny Angel in May 1964 took a break from competition. He made a comeback in 1965, winning four of his first five fights (including victory over Jim Swords for the vacant BBBofC Central Area middleweight title), and drawing one (against Harwood).

In September 1965 Jacobs fought British middleweight champion Wally Swift in London, initially being named the winner by the referee; After complaints by Swift the fighters were brought back into the ring where the referee explained that he had made a mistake and declared Swift the victor.

Jacobs fought for the British middleweight title in Nottingham in 1966, losing to Johnny Pritchett after the referee stopped the fight after the 13th round following consultation with his seconds. This was one of five straight defeats for Jacobs but he returned to winning ways with a narrow points victory over Terry McTigue in May 1967, after which followed another break from the sport.

He returned in April 1968 with a points victory over Clarence Cassius, which was followed by two defeats. He beat Larry Brown in November 1968 after four rounds, despite a height and weight disadvantage and afterwards announced that he would be moving down to welterweight. He faced British and Empire welterweight champion Ralph Charles at the Royal Albert Hall in 1969 in a fight that was televised by the BBC and also shown in Australia. He continued to box until 1970, his final fight a defeat by Tom Jensen in Valby, Denmark in June that year.

Jacobs died on 19 March 2021, at the age of 81.

=== Record ===
28 Wins (13 knockouts), 26 Losses, 2 Draws
Res.	Record	Opponent	Type	Round	Time	Date	Location	Notes
Loss		(Denmark) Tom Jensen	PTS	6		4 June 1970	Valby Hallen, Valby, Denmark	
Loss		Ronnie Hough	TKO	10		4 May 1970	New Century Hall, Manchester, Lancashire, United Kingdom	BBBofC Central Area middleweight title fight
Loss		Ralph Charles	TKO	5 (10)		15 April 1969	Royal Albert Hall, Kensington, London, United Kingdom	
Win		Fred Powney	PTS	8		24 March 1969	National Sporting Club, Mayfair, London, United Kingdom	
Win		Don McMillan	PTS	8		17 March 1969	Anglo American Sporting Club, Hotel Piccadilly, Manchester, Lancashire, United Kingdom	
Win		Larry Brown	RTD	4		25 November 1968	Broadway Sporting Club, Manchester, Lancashire, United Kingdom	
Loss		Mark Rowe	TKO	3		21 October 1968	Hilton Hotel (Anglo American SC), Mayfair, London, United Kingdom	
Loss		Len Gibbs	PTS	8		30 September 1968	Broadway Sporting Club, Manchester, Lancashire, United Kingdom	
Win		Clarence Cassius	PTS	8		29 April 1968	Free Trade Hall, Manchester, Lancashire, United Kingdom	
Win		Terry McTigue	PTS	8		15 May 1967	King's Hall, Belle Vue, Manchester, Lancashire, United Kingdom	
Loss		(Denmark) Tom Bogs	PTS	10		2 March 1967	K.B. Hallen, Copenhagen, Denmark	
Loss		Johnny Pritchett	TKO	13 (15)		21 March 1966	Ice Rink, Nottingham, Nottinghamshire, United Kingdom	Lost BBBofC British middleweight title fight.
Loss		(Italy) Fabio Bettini	PTS	10		6 December 1965	Free Trade Hall, Manchester, Lancashire, United Kingdom	
Loss		Peter Sharpe	PTS	10		2 November 1965	Ulster Hall, Belfast, Northern Ireland, United Kingdom	
Loss		Wally Swift	PTS	10		21 September 1965	King's Hall, Belle Vue, Manchester, Lancashire, United Kingdom	
Win		Jim Swords	KO	2 (10)		10 May 1965	Free Trade Hall, Manchester, Lancashire, United Kingdom	BBBofC Central Area middleweight title fight
Win		Willie Fisher	TKO	6 (10)		5 April 1965	Free Trade Hall, Manchester, Lancashire, United Kingdom	
Draw		Jackie Harwood	PTS	8		15 March 1965	Free Trade Hall, Manchester, Lancashire, United Kingdom	
Win		Syd Brown	PTS	8		4 March 1965	The Stadium, Liverpool, Merseyside, United Kingdom	
Win		Terry Phillips	TKO	8		15 February 1965	Free Trade Hall, Manchester, Lancashire, United Kingdom	
Loss		Johnny Angel	RTD	6 (8)		11 May 1964	Free Trade Hall, Manchester, Lancashire, United Kingdom	
Win		Peter Sharpe	PTS	8		13 April 1964	Free Trade Hall, Manchester, Lancashire, United Kingdom	
Loss		Ebe Mensah	PTS	8		25 March 1964	Midlands Sporting Club, Solihull, West Midlands, United Kingdom	
Win		Dave George	PTS	8		9 March 1964	Free Trade Hall, Manchester, Lancashire, United Kingdom	
Loss		Jackie Harwood	TKO	6 (10)		10 February 1964	Free Trade Hall, Manchester, Lancashire, United Kingdom	BBBofC Central Area Middleweight Title eliminator
Loss		(Italy) Luciano Piazza	PTS	10		24 January 1964	PalaLido, Milan, Lombardia, Italy	
Loss		Johnny Kramer	PTS	10		9 December 1963	Free Trade Hall, Manchester, Lancashire, United Kingdom	
Loss		Ernest Musso	PTS	8		27 November 1963	Midlands Sporting Club, Solihull, West Midlands, United Kingdom	
Win		Peter McLaren	TKO	9 (10)		11 November 1963	Free Trade Hall, Manchester, Lancashire, United Kingdom	
Win		Bobby Day	KO	1 (10)		21 October 1963	Free Trade Hall, Manchester, Lancashire, United Kingdom	
Loss		Jackie Harwood	PTS	8		9 September 1963	Free Trade Hall, Manchester, Lancashire, United Kingdom	
Win		Gordon Mullin	TKO	3 (8)		10 June 1963	Free Trade Hall, Manchester, Lancashire, United Kingdom	
Win		Jack Burley	KO	1 (8)		18 March 1963	Free Trade Hall, Manchester, Lancashire, United Kingdom	
Win		Jimmy Gibson	PTS	8		28 February 1963	Kelvin Hall, Glasgow, Scotland, United Kingdom	
Loss		Johnny Cooke	PTS	8		10 December 1962	King's Hall, Belle Vue, Manchester, Lancashire, United Kingdom	
Loss		Brian Husband	PTS	6		10 September 1962	Free Trade Hall, Manchester, Lancashire, United Kingdom	
Loss		Maxie Smith	PTS	8		7 June 1962	Free Trade Hall, Manchester, Lancashire, United Kingdom	
Loss		George Palin	PTS	8		5 March 1962	Preston, Lancashire, United Kingdom	
Loss		Tommy Molloy	DQ	3 (10)		8 February 1962	Preston, Lancashire, United Kingdom	
Loss		Jimmy McGrail	TKO	5 (10)		23 January 1962	Empire Pool, Wembley, London, United Kingdom	
Win		George Palin	KO	3 (8)		15 January 1962	Free Trade Hall, Manchester, Lancashire, United Kingdom	
Loss		Cliff Brown	DQ	1 (8)		8 September 1961	Northampton, Northamptonshire, United Kingdom	
Draw		George Palin	PTS	6		15 June 1961	Free Trade Hall, Manchester, Lancashire, United Kingdom	
Win		Eddie Phillips	PTS	4		8 May 1961	Ice Rink, Nottingham, Nottinghamshire, United Kingdom	
Win		Peter Sharpe	PTS	8		24 April 1961	Northampton, Northamptonshire, United Kingdom	
Loss		Maurice Lloyd	DQ	2 (6)		10 April 1961	Free Trade Hall, Manchester, Lancashire, United Kingdom	
Win		Tommy Corrigan	PTS	6		27 March 1961	Drill Hall, Northampton, Northamptonshire, United Kingdom	
Win		Tony Barry	TKO	3 (8)		13 March 1961	Free Trade Hall, Manchester, Lancashire, United Kingdom	
Win		Eddie Phillips	PTS	8		27 February 1961	Ice Rink, Nottingham, Nottinghamshire, United Kingdom	
Loss		George Palin	DQ	4 (6)		13 February 1961	Free Trade Hall, Manchester, Lancashire, United Kingdom	
Win		Eddie Phillips	PTS	6		24 January 1961	Granby Halls, Leicester, Leicestershire, United Kingdom	
Win		Freddie Collins	KO	4 (6)		16 January 1961	Northampton, Northamptonshire, United Kingdom	
Win		Sunny Osemegie	PTS	6		5 December 1960	Drill Hall, Northampton, Northamptonshire, United Kingdom	
Win		Billy Goodwin	KO	1 (6)		28 November 1960	National Sporting Club, Piccadilly, London, United Kingdom	
Win		Tommy Donovan	TKO	4		21 November 1960	Ice Rink, Nottingham, Nottinghamshire, United Kingdom	
Win		Sunny Osemegie	PTS	6		14 November 1960	Drill Hall, Northampton, Northamptonshire, United Kingdom	Professional debut.

== Family ==
Nat Jacobs' marriage to Kathleen (née Sharpe) (birth registered during January→March 1941 (age 84–85) in Nottingham district) was registered during April→June 1958 in Nottingham district, they had children, including; Nathaniel P. Jacobs (born 18 March 1961 in Nottingham district – died 6 March 2002 (aged 40) in Manchester Royal Infirmary). Nat Jacobs is the younger brother of the amateur (Great Britain) and professional lightweight boxer Joseph "Joe" W. S. Jacobs (birth registered April→June 1936 in Manchester South district – died 18 April 1981 (aged 44–45)), and uncle of the amateur and professional boxer (Central (England) Area lightweight champion, British lightweight challenger, British super featherweight Champion, WBO super featherweight challenger), Joey Jacobs (born 1 October 1960 (age 65)).
