= Eva E. Jacobs =

Statistician

Eva Eisenberg Jacobs (January 17, 1921 – April 28, 2015) was a statistician with the U.S. Bureau of Labor Statistics who edited their Handbook of U. S. Labor Statistics and headed their Division of Consumer Expenditure Surveys.

Eva Eisenberg was born in New York City, and joined the government service in 1942, studying productivity and economic growth at the Labor Department. She became chief of Consumer Expenditure Surveys beginning in 1972, and retired in 1993. In her retirement, she edited the Handbook of U.S. Labor Statistics from 1997 to 2008.

In 1982, Jacobs was elected as a Fellow of the American Statistical Association. In 1998, the Business and Economic Statistics Section of the American Statistical Association gave her their Julius Shiskin Award "for her management of the Consumer Expenditure Survey Program, her work on the use of the Consumer Expenditure Survey data to analyze and interpret the economy, and her responsiveness to customer needs".

She died at age 94, of complications of congestive heart failure, in Bethesda, Maryland, on April 28, 2015.
