= Ron Jacobs =

Ron Jacobs is the name of:

- Ron Jacobs (rugby union) (1928–2002), England rugby union player
- Ron Jacobs (broadcaster) (1937–2016), American broadcaster
- Ron Jacobs (basketball) (1942–2015), American basketball coach
