= Solomon Jacobs =

English-Canadian rabbi (1861–1920)

Solomon Jacobs (9 July 1861 – 6 August 1920) was an English, later Canadian rabbi.

Born and educated in England, Jacobs became minister of the Amalgamated Congregation of Israelites in Kingston, Jamaica around 1886. There, he lobbied successfully for the removal of a stamp tax on Jewish weddings.

In 1900, Jacobs moved to Toronto to become rabbi of the recently completed Holy Blossom synagogue. Jacobs' influence quickly grew beyond that temple and he became a representative of Jews throughout the area.
