= George Jacobs (Salem witch trials) =

English Colonist during the Salem Witch Trials

George Jacobs Sr.
- Born: February 13, 1609; Bishop's Stortford, Hertfordshire, England
- Died: August 19, 1692 (aged 83); Salem, Massachusetts Bay Colony
- Cause of death: Hanging
- Children: George Jacobs Jr.
- Parent(s): George and Priscilla Jacob

George Jacobs Sr. (1609–1692) was an English colonist in the Massachusetts Bay Colony who was accused of witchcraft in 1692 during the Salem witch trials in Salem Village, Massachusetts. He was convicted and hanged on August 19, 1692. His son, George Jr., was also accused but evaded arrest. Jacobs' accusers included his daughter-in-law and granddaughter, Margaret.

Jacobs was believed to be the George Jacob baptized 13 February 1608/09 at St. Dunstan in the West, London, son of barber-surgeon George Jacob and wife Priscilla of Bishop's Stortford, Hertfordshire.

== Burial ==
Jacobs' body was buried near where he was hanged. Tradition stated that he was buried on his farm and the location was forgotten when the farm was abandoned. In the 1950s, the bones were unearthed when developers began to bulldoze the former farm site. The bones were boxed up and passed through the hands of several local historical societies.

In the 1970s the bones were rediscovered, believed to belong to Jacobs. They were tested and found to have osteoarthritis. George Jacobs walked with two canes. The bones were found in a drawer at the Danvers Historical Society. At a ceremony in 1992 marking the 300th anniversary of the Salem Witch Trials, Jacobs' remains were reinterred at the Nurse Graveyard at the Rebecca Nurse Homestead, which is maintained as a historic site.

== Trial of George Jacobs ==
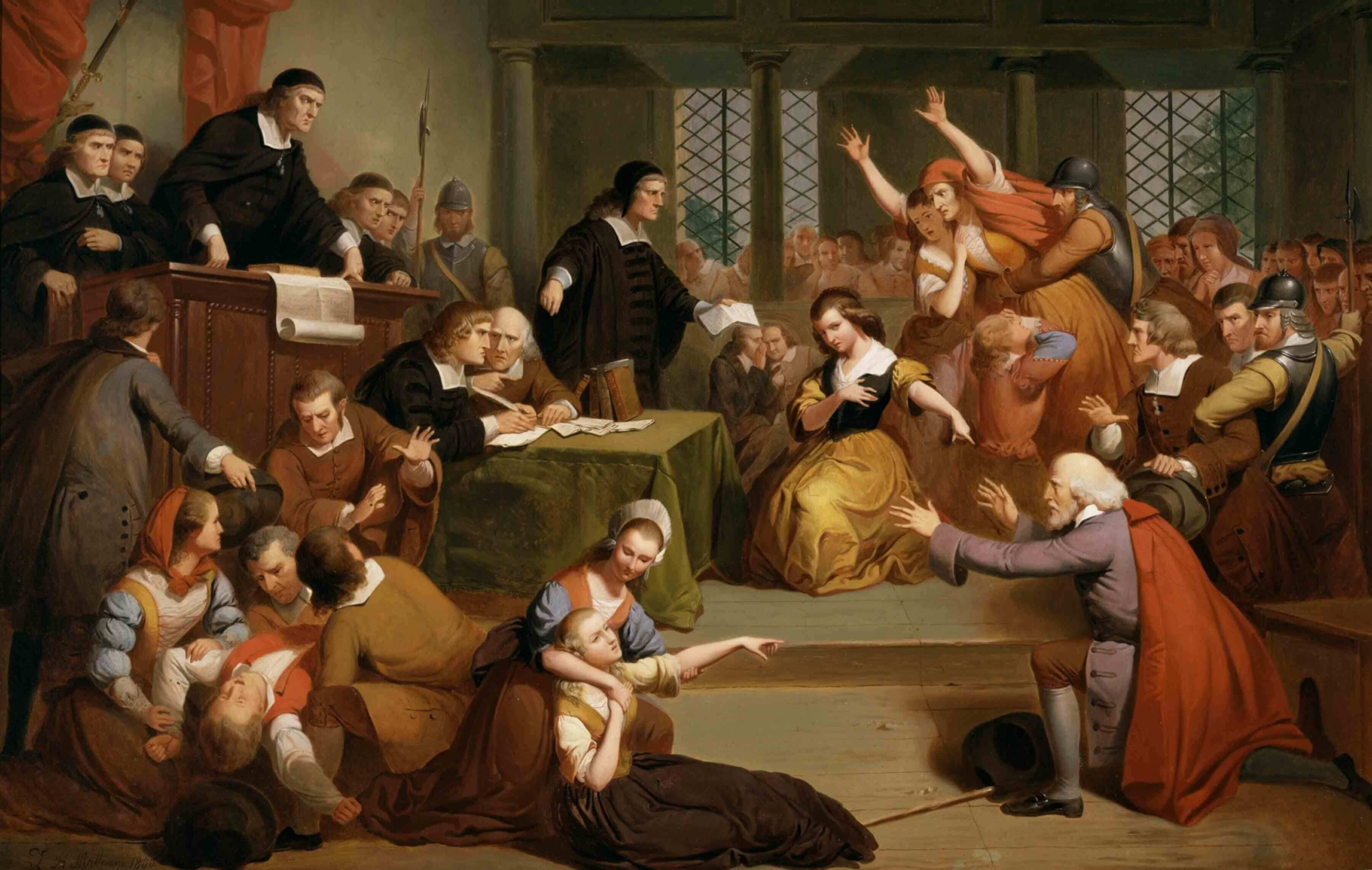
George Jacobs accused by his granddaughter - a reconstruction of his trial by Thompkins. H. Matteson

The painting Trial of George Jacobs, August 5, 1692 was created by Tompkins H. Matteson in 1855, and is based on the accounts of George Jacobs' granddaughter.

The painting depicts Jacobs, who is being consoled by his son, George. On the left of the painting is Chief Magistrate William Stoughton, who would later serve three terms as Governor of Massachusetts. Jacobs' principal accuser was his granddaughter, who implicated him in an attempt to save her own life. Jacobs' daughter-in-law is the woman standing and being held back. She was thought to be mentally ill (brain tumour). John Hathorne, the judge hearing the accusation, is thought to be an ancestor of Nathaniel Hawthorne. He holds a book and points at Jacobs' granddaughter as if challenging her to substantiate her earlier written statements. In the foreground are a girl and boy who are having fits, allegedly caused by Jacobs' wizardry. The boy is unknown but the girl may be either Jacobs' servant or accuser Ann Putnam Jr.

== Representation in other media ==
Jacobs appears as a minor character in the 1996 film The Crucible, based on Arthur Miller's 1953 play about the Salem witch trials. He was portrayed by William Preston.

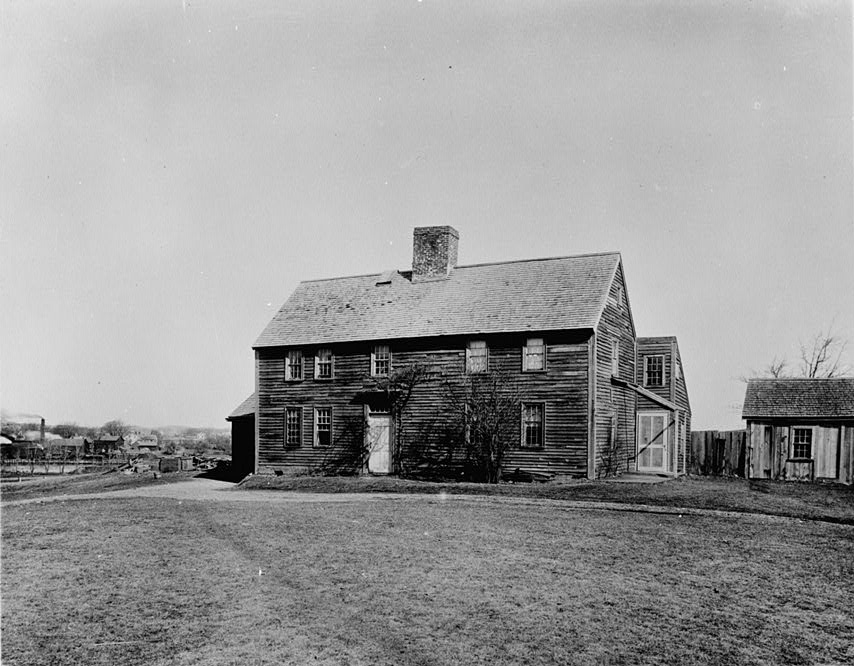
Archival photograph of George Jacobs' house taken in the later 19th century or early 20th century

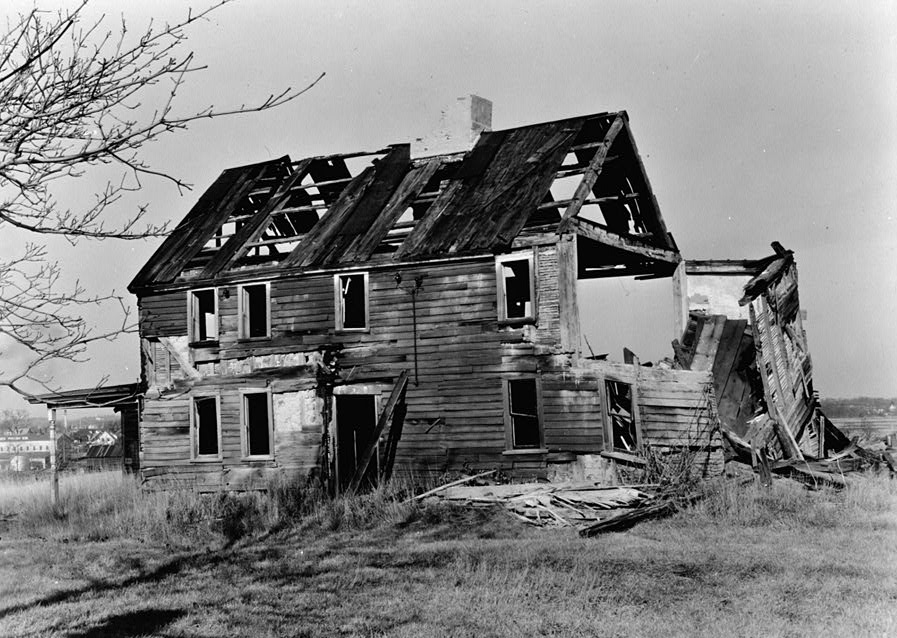
Archival photograph of the ruin of the house taken circa 1935, before it fell down entirely in 1938
