= David Jacobs (steroid dealer) =

American athlete (1973–2008)

David Jacobs (c. 1973 – June 5, 2008) was an American personal trainer.

== Background ==
Federal agents say at one point Jacobs was involved with 'one of the largest steroid rings in the United States'. Jacobs also ran a health store in Plano, Texas called Supplement Outlet funded by his $30,000-a-month illegal steroid business.

== National Football League ==
On May 1, 2008, Jacobs was sentenced to three years' probation and fined $25,000 after pleading guilty the previous year in federal court to conspiring to possess anabolic steroids with intent to distribute. He gained notoriety after choosing to cooperate with NFL officials in their investigation regarding use of steroids by players. On May 21, 2008, Jacobs met with NFL representatives and gave them a list of players he claimed had bought steroids from him. Jacobs said he sold tens of thousands of dollars' worth of performance-enhancing drugs to former Dallas Cowboys offensive lineman Matt Lehr in 2006 and 2007; Lehr denied this. '[I]f what Jacobs alleged is true,' wrote Dallas Morning News columnist Kevin Sherrington, 'the NFL has a BALCO case on its hands.'

On January 23, 2010, The Dallas Morning News reported that Jacobs told the paper he supplied steroids to NFL quarterback Michael Vick while the latter played for the Atlanta Falcons. When questioned by federal agents and prosecutors, Vick denied the allegations.

== Death ==
On June 5, 2008, police discovered Jacobs, along with his "on-again, off-again" girlfriend, prominent fitness model Amanda Earhart-Savell, both dead of multiple gunshot wounds from a .40-caliber Glock handgun. Police shortly thereafter began characterizing their investigation as consistent with a murder–suicide. Police had been alerted to possible foul play after friends of Savell had reported she had been missing for several days, and officers were sent to check on their welfare at Jacobs's house located in Plano, Texas. Also found in his house were "146 vials of steroids, 10 syringes, scales, bags with steroids and marijuana, a computer, and a .22 semi-automatic gun with ammunition." Authorities ultimately found Jacobs responsible.

== Personal life ==
Jacobs was the son of David Jacobs, a three time world champion at the Trampoline Gymnastics World Championships.
