= Ontario New Democratic Party candidates in the 1995 Ontario provincial election =

The governing New Democratic Party of Ontario ran a full slate of candidates in the 1995 Ontario provincial election, and fell to third place status with 17 of 130 seats. Many of the party's candidates have their own biography pages; information on others may be found here.

== Central Ontario ==
| Riding | Candidate's Name | Notes | Residence | Occupation | Votes | % | Rank |
|---|---|---|---|---|---|---|---|
| Dufferin—Peel | Sandra Crane | | | | 3,470 | | 3rd |
| Hastings—Peterborough | Elmer Buchanan | | | | 8,328 | 27.87 | 2nd |
| Muskoka–Georgian Bay | Dan Waters | | | | 7,742 | | 3rd |
| Northumberland | Murray Weppler | | | | 4,539 | | 3rd |
| Peterborough | Jenny Carter | | Peterborough | Teacher | 7,581 | | 1st |
| Simcoe Centre | Paul Wessenger | Member of Barrie City Council (1973–1976) | | Lawyer | 7,655 | | 3rd |
| Simcoe East | Marg Ducie | | | | 4,849 | | 3rd |
| Simcoe West | Kathy Simpson | | | | 4,937 | | 3rd |
| Victoria—Haliburton | Cathy Vainio | | | | 4,210 | | 3rd |

== Eastern Ontario/Ottawa ==
| Riding | Candidate's Name | Notes | Residence | Occupation | Votes | % | Rank |
|---|---|---|---|---|---|---|---|
| Carleton | Cathy Hallessey | | | | 4,046 | | 3rd |
| Carleton East | Fiona Faucher | | | | 4,783 | | 3rd |
| Cornwall | Syd Gardiner | | | | 1,71 | | 3rd |
| Frontenac—Addington | Fred Wilson | | | | 7,302 | | 3rd |
| Kingston and the Islands | Gary Wilson | | Kingston | Union leader (CUPE)/Librarian | 8.052 | | 3rd |
| Lanark—Renfrew | Don Page | | | | 3,455 | | 3rd |
| Leeds—Grenville | Charles Stewart | | | | 2,316 | | 3rd |
| Nepean | John Sullivan | | | Union leader (PSAC) | 3,274 | | 3rd |
| Ottawa Centre | Evelyn Gigantes | Member of Provincial Parliament for Ottawa Centre (1985–1987); Member of Provincial Parliament for Carleton East (1975–1981) | | Radio/television broadcaster | 9,438 | 33.23 | 2nd |
| Ottawa East | David Dyment | | | | 4,818 | | 3rd |
| Ottawa–Rideau | Dan McIntyre | | | | 4,138 | | 3rd |
| Ottawa South | Margaret Armstrong | | | | 4,235 | | 3rd |
| Ottawa West | Karim Ismaili | | | | 3,718 | | 3rd |
| Prince Edward—Lennox | Paul Johnson | Member of Athol Township Council (1988–1990) | | Lawyer | 5,996 | | 3rd |
| Quinte | Barb Dolan | | | | 3,743 | | 3rd |
| Renfrew North | Ish Theilheimer | | | Magazine publisher | 2,483 | | 3rd |
| Stormont—Dundas—Glengarry and East Grenville | Michael Cowley-Owen | | | | 2,285 | | 3rd |

== Greater Toronto Area ==
| Riding | Candidate's Name | Notes | Residence | Occupation | Votes | % | Rank |
|---|---|---|---|---|---|---|---|
| Beaches—Woodbine | Frances Lankin | | | | 10,862 | | 1st |
| Brampton North | John Devries | ONDP candidate for Brampton North in the 1990 provincial election | | | 5,288 | | 3rd |
| Brampton South | Paul Ledgister | | | | 5,676 | | 3rd |
| Burlington South | David Miles | | | | 3,507 | | 3rd |
| Don Mills | Janaki Bala-Krishnan | | | | 4,569 | | 3rd |
| Dovercourt | Tony Silipo | | | | 9,049 | | 1st |
| Downsview | Anthony Perruzza | | | | 8,782 | | 2nd |
| Durham Centre | Drummond White | | | | 8,120 | | 3rd |
| Durham East | Gord Mills | | | | 8,519 | | 2nd |
| Durham West | Jim Wiseman | | | | 9,444 | | 3rd |
| Durham—York | Larry O'Connor | | | Auto Worker | 8,048 | | 2nd |
| Eglinton | Adam Di Carlo | | | | 4,597 | | 3rd |
| Etobicoke–Humber | Osman Ali | | | | 3,100 | | 3rd |
| Etobicoke—Lakeshore | Ruth Grier | | | | 8,279 | | 3rd |
| Etobicoke—Rexdale | Ed Philip | | | | 8,668 | | 2nd |
| Etobicoke West | Judy Jones | ONDP candidate for Etobicoke West in the 1990 provincial election | | | 4,608 | | 3rd |
| Fort York | Rosario Marchese | | | | 10,762 | | 1st |
| Halton Centre | Richard Banigan | ONDP candidate for Halton Centre in the 1990 provincial election | | | 5,268 | | 3rd |
| Halton North | Noel Duignan | | | | 4,362 | | 3rd |
| High Park—Swansea | Elaine Ziemba | | | | 8,899 | | 2nd |
| Lawrence | Donato Santeramo | | | | 5,000 | | 3rd |
| Markham | Mike Tang | | | | 7,779 | | 3rd |
| Mississauga East | Zenia Wadhwani | | | | 5,120 | | 3rd |
| Mississauga North | Dan Shekhar | | | | 5,283 | | 3rd |
| Mississauga South | David Messenger | | | | 3,282 | | 3rd |
| Mississauga West | Paul Daniel | | | | 6,758 | | 3rd |
| Oakville South | Willie Lambert | | | | 2,973 | | 3rd |
| Oakwood | Tony Rizzo | | | | 7,624 | | 2nd |
| Oriole | David Cox | | | | 3,665 | | 3rd |
| Oshawa | Allan Pilkey | | | | 8,450 | | 2nd |
| Parkdale | Martin Silva | | | | 5,795 | | 2nd |
| Riverdale | Marilyn Churley | | | | 10,948 | | 1st |
| Scarborough—Agincourt | Christine Fei | | | | 4,112 | | 3rd |
| Scarborough Centre | Steve Owens | | | | 6,841 | | 3rd |
| Scarborough East | Bob Frankford | | | | 7,212 | | 2nd |
| Scarborough—Ellesmere | David Warner | | | Teacher | 7,906 | | 2nd |
| Scarborough North | Tarek Fatah | | | | 6,431 | | 3rd |
| Scarborough West | Anne Swarbrick | | | | 9,216 | | 2nd |
| St. Andrew—St. Patrick | David Jacobs | NDP candidate for St. Paul's in the 1993 federal election | | Lawyer | 9,231 | | 3rd |
| St. George—St. David | Brent Hawkes | | | | 9,672 | | 3rd |
| Willowdale | Julie McCrea | | | | 4,825 | | 3rd |
| Wilson Heights | Claudia White | | | | 4,612 | | 3rd |
| York Centre | Joseph Thevarkunnel | | | | 6,698 | | 3rd |
| York East | Gary Malkowski | | | | 9,526 | | 2nd |
| York—Mackenzie | | | | | | | |
| York Mills | Lesley Durham | | | | 2,930 | | 3rd |
| York South | Bob Rae | | | | 10,442 | | 1st |
| Yorkview | Giorgio Mammoliti | | | | 6,447 | | 2nd |

== Hamilton/Niagara ==
| Riding | Candidate's Name | Notes | Residence | Occupation | Votes | % | Rank |
|---|---|---|---|---|---|---|---|
| Hamilton Centre | David Christopherson | Member of Hamilton City Council (1985–1990) | Hamilton | Union leader (United Auto Workers) | 8,012 | | 1st |
| Hamilton East | Andrew Mackenzie | | | | 7,042 | | 2nd |
| Hamilton Mountain | Brian Charlton | Member of Provincial Parliament for Hamilton Mountain (1977–1995) | Hamilton | Property assessor | 9,817 | | 3rd |
| Hamilton West | Richard Allen | Member of Provincial Parliament for Hamilton West (1982–1995) | Dundas | Professor at McMaster University | 9,267 | | 2ns |
| Lincoln | Ron Hansen | | | Engineer | 5,800 | | 3rd |
| Niagara Falls | Margaret Harrington | | | | 7,034 | | 3rd |
| Niagara South | Shirley Coppen | | | Nursing assistant | 5,376 | | 3rd |
| St. Catharines | Jeff Burch | | | | 3,929 | | 3rd |
| St. Catharines—Brock | Christel Haeck | | | | 5,521 | | 3rd |
| Welland–Thorold | Peter Kormos | Member of Provincial Parliament for Welland–Thorold (1988–1999) | Welland | Lawyer | 12,848 | | 1st |
| Wentworth East | Mark Morrow | | | Lathe operator | 6,667 | | 3rd |
| Wentworth North | Don Abel | | | Union official (CUPE) | 6,474 | | 3rd |

== Northern Ontario ==
| Riding | Candidate's Name | Notes | Residence | Occupation | Votes | % | Rank |
|---|---|---|---|---|---|---|---|
| Algoma | Bud Wildman | Member of Provincial Parliament for Algoma (1975–1999) | Echo Bay | Teacher | 6,190 | | 1st |
| Algoma—Manitoulin | Lois Miller | | | | 2,991 | | 3rd |
| Cochrane North | Len Wood | | | Mechanic | 6,935 | | 1st |
| Cochrane South | Gilles Bisson | | Timmins | Union organizer | 12,114 | | 1st |
| Fort William | Greg Laws | | | | 4,561 | | 3rd |
| Kenora | Mike Clancy | | | | 2,788 | | 3rd |
| Lake Nipigon | Gilles Pouliot | Member of Provincial Parliament for Lake Nipigon (1985–1999); Mayor of Manitouwadge | Manitouwadge | Miner | 5,079 | | 1st |
| Nickel Belt | Floyd Laughren | Member of Provincial Parliament for Nickel Belt (1971–1998) | Sudbury | Professor at Cambrian College | 8,007 | | 1st |
| Nipissing | Doug Bennett | | | | 4,350 | | 3rd |
| Parry Sound | Dan Reed | | | | 3,367 | | 3rd |
| Port Arthur | Shelley Wark-Martyn | | | Nurse | 7,490 | | 2nd |
| Rainy River | Howard Hampton | Member of Provincial Parliament for Rainy River (1987–1999) | | Lawyer | 4,912 | | 1st |
| Sault Ste. Marie | Tony Martin | | | | 15,392 | | 1st |
| Sudbury | Sharon Murdock | | | Lawyer | 8,698 | | 2nd |
| Sudbury East | Shelley Martel | Member of Provincial Parliament for Sudbury East (1987–1999) | | Insurance professional | 11,236 | | 1st |
| Timiskaming | Ambrose Raftis | | | | 2,962 | | 2nd |

== Southwestern Ontario ==
| Riding | Candidate's Name | Notes | Residence | Occupation | Votes | % | Rank |
|---|---|---|---|---|---|---|---|
| Brantford | Brad Ward | Member of Provincial Parliament for Brantford (1990–1995) | | | 8,165 | | 3rd |
| Brant–Haldimand | Willem Hanrath | | | | 3,030 | | 3rd |
| Bruce | Robert Emerson | | | | 4,269 | | 3rd |
| Cambridge | Mike Farnan | Member of Provincial Parliament for Cambridge (1987–1995) | | | 11,797 | | 1st |
| Chatham—Kent | Randy Hope | Member of Provincial Parliament for Chatham—Kent (1990–1995) | | | 7,444 | | 3rd |
| Elgin | Hugh MacGinnis | | | | 3,445 | | 3rd |
| Essex–Kent | Pat Hayes | | | | 7,837 | | 3rd |
| Essex South | Dave Maris | | | | 4,348 | | 3rd |
| Grey—Owen Sound | Greg Cooper | | | | 3,413 | | 3rd |
| Guelph | Derek Fletcher | Member of Provincial Parliament for Guelph (1990–1995) | | | 10,278 | | 3rd |
| Huron | Paul Klopp | Member of Provincial Parliament for Huron (1990–1995) | | | 6,927 | | 3rd |
| Kitchener | Sandi Ellis | | | | 6,998 | | 3rd |
| Kitchener—Wilmot | Mike Cooper | Member of Provincial Parliament for Kitchener—Wilmot (1990–1995) | | | 8,146 | | 3rd |
| Lambton | Dona Stewardson | | | | 5,055 | | 3rd |
| London Centre | Marion Boyd | Member of Provincial Parliament for London Centre (1990–1999) | | | 11,096 | | 1st |
| London North | Carolyn Davies | ONDP candidate for London North in the 1990 provincial election | | | 8,167 | | 3rd |
| London South | David Winninger | Member of Provincial Parliament for London South (1990–1995) | | | 10,729 | | 2nd |
| Middlesex | Irene Mathyssen | Member of Provincial Parliament for Middlesex (1990–1995) | | | 8,799 | | 2nd |
| Norfolk | Norm Jamison | Member of Provincial Parliament for Norfolk (1990–1995) | | | 7,893 | | 3rd |
| Oxford | Kimble Sutherland | Member of Provincial Parliament for Oxford (1990–1995) | | | 9,501 | | 2nd |
| Perth | Karen Haslam | Member of Provincial Parliament for Perth (1990–1995) | | | 8,445 | | 2nd |
| Sarnia | Bob Huget | Member of Provincial Parliament for Sarnia (1990–1995) | | | 7,487 | | 3rd |
| Waterloo North | Hugh Miller | ONDP candidate for Waterloo North in the 1990 provincial election | | | 6,869 | | 3rd |
| Wellington | Elaine Rogala | | | | 4,104 | | 3rd |
| Windsor—Riverside | Dave Cooke | Member of Provincial Parliament for Windsor—Riverside (1977–1997) | | | 12,347 | | 1st |
| Windsor—Sandwich | Arlene Rousseau | Candidate for Ward 2 in the 1991 Windsor municipal election | | | 6,414 | | 2nd |
| Windsor—Walkerville | Wayne Lessard | | | | 9,901 | | 2nd |
