= Andy Jacobs =

British sports radio personality

Andrew Ian Jacobs (born 26 November 1952) is a British sports radio personality who presents the Hawksbee and Jacobs show alongside Paul Hawksbee on Talksport in the UK, on Mondays, Tuesdays and Fridays live from 13:00-16:00. He also writes and presents 'The Birthday Spread' feature on Thursdays at 15:30.

They have been presenters on talkSPORT since the station's inception in 2000; having worked for the station when it was known as Talk Radio in 1999.

Jacobs was the founding editor of FHM magazine, and the head of development at Avalon Television, producing series Fantasy Football League for BBC2, and Fantasy World Cup for ITV.

== Personal life ==
Jacobs is a fan of Chelsea FC. The singer, entertainer and broadcaster Sam Costa was his great-uncle.
