= Paul Jacobs (Flemish writer) =

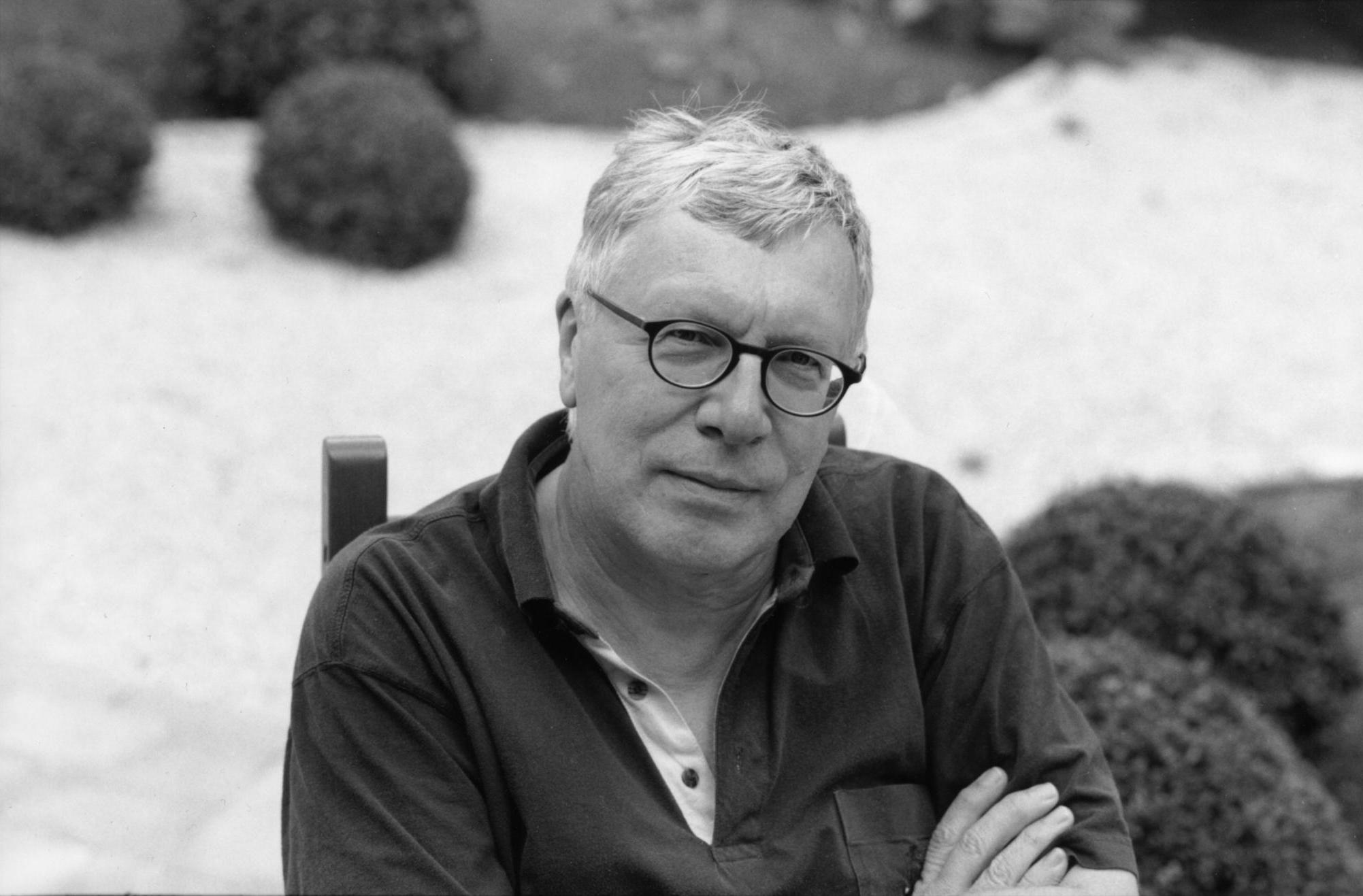
- Paul Jacobs (Flemish writer)
- Born: 24 January 1949 (age 77); Mortsel
- Occupations: Writer; radio and television producer

Paul Jacobs (born in Mortsel, near Antwerp, 24 January 1949) is a Flemish radio and television producer and writer.

== Education ==
Jacobs briefly attended the Hogeschool van Audiovisuele Communicatie, RITCS, in Brussels, but never finished his studies.

== Radio and television ==
Jacobs started his career when he was 22, as a writer and reporter with the BRT 1 radio programme Dagboek, produced by Jan Geysen. The programme was controversial and ran for only a year, but Geysen's name opened doors. For the next ten years Jacobs was able to freelance as a writing journalist and reporter for several radio programmes with BRT 2 Omroep Antwerpen.

In 1981 he became a producer with Radio 1. Until his retirement in 2005 he created several radio shows, e.g. Het Vermoeden, De Taalstrijd and Vriend & Vijand, in which he interviewed 200 celebrities in Belgium and the Netherlands.

For VRT television he developed the quizzes Jij of Wij, De IQ-Kwis (with Herman Van Molle), Kennis van Zaken and De Tekstbaronnen. His De Rechtvaardige Rechters was a panel game show that ran for almost ten years.

== Writing ==
As a young man, Jacobs wrote stories for magazines and translated novels.

Jacobs has written a crime fiction series in which the hero is Thomas Breens:

- De rode badkuip (Houtekiet, 2008)
- Een ijskoud gerecht (Houtekiet, 2009)
- De laatste grap (Houtekiet, 2010)
- Het droomdagboek van Lavoisier (Houtekiet, 2011)
- Dood van een egoïst (Houtekiet, 2013)
- Franse zonden (Houtekiet, 2015)
- Tien grote talenten (Houtekiet, 2016)
- De moordenaarsclub (Houtekiet, 2017)
- Driemaal moordwaarde (Houtekiet, 2018)
- Een hoogst verleidelijk man (Houtekiet, 2019)
- De Exenkring (Houtekiet, 2020)
- De Agatha Christie-kenner (Houtekiet 2021)
- Marijkes wraak (Parador, 2023)
- Een afschuwelijke vergissing (Parador, 2024)
- De bodem van de Loire (Parador, 2026)

He has written one novel for children, Het raadsel van Rose Cottage, three short story collections, a selection of his columns, and two collections of interviews. He wrote three scenarios for the television drama series Made in Vlaanderen: De man die niet van gedichten hield (1981), Het landhuis (1989) and the thriller Moordterras (1991, director Roland Verhavert). For the BRT and IKON television series Oog in Oog he wrote the monologue De oude bibliotheek (1992).

In 1997 the Arca theatre in Ghent commissioned Jacobs to write the comedy Komt u hier dikwijls? The play was awarded the Drama Prize of the province of Antwerp. Three of his radio programmes were awarded the Gouden Klokke Roeland by the Flemish radio and television journalists.
