= Pete Jacobs (musician) =

American jazz musician

Pete Edward Jacobs (May 7, 1899 in Asbury Park, New Jersey – c. 1952) was an American jazz drummer.

Jacobs played in the Musical Aces, then joined the band of Claude Hopkins from 1926 to 1928. He left Hopkins to play with Charlie Skeete in 1928, then returned to play with Hopkins from 1928 until 1938. During this ten-year tenure in Hopkins's orchestra, Jacobs recorded extensively with the group on Brunswick Records, particularly during the period 1932 to 1927. Additionally, he appeared with the band in the short films Barbershop Blues (1933) and By Request (1936).

Jacobs fell ill in 1938 and had to quit the group, and never returned to active performance.
