= Benjamin Jacobs (dentist) =

Holocaust survivor, memoirist, and dentist (1919-2004)

Dr Benjamin Jacobs
- Born: Berek or Bronek Jakubowicz; 18 November 1919; Poland
- Died: 30 January 2004 (aged 84)
- Medical career
- Profession: Dentist
- Notable works: The Dentist of Auschwitz: A Memoir

Benjamin Jacobs, born Bronek Jakubowicz or Berek Jakubowicz, was a dentist who in 1941, was deported from his Polish village and remained a Nazi prisoner until the final days of the Second World War. He survived Auschwitz and the death march to the Baltic, with the help of his dental tools. In 1945, he then survived the Royal Air Force attack on the ocean liners turned into prison camps in the Bay of Lubeck. After the war, he settled in Boston, USA, worked as a dentist and toured to give interviews about his wartime experiences. In 1995, he published his memoirs, The Dentist of Auschwitz: A Memoir, recounting his experiences and revulsion at having to strip gold from prisoners at Auschwitz in exchange for extra provisions for his family.

In 2004, with co-author Eugene Pool, he recounted the Bay of Lubeck incident in a book entitled The 100-Year Secret: Britain's Hidden WWII Massacre.

== Life ==
Bronek Jaciebowicz also spelled Berek Jakubowicz, and later known as Benjamin Jacobs, was born in 1919. In June 1941, he was a first year dental student and one of 160 men aged between 16 and 60 that were taken from the small town of Dobra in western Poland by the occupying Nazis and sent on a journey through a series of labour and concentration camps.

On the advice of his mother, he carried his dental tools and despite being limited as to which procedures he could perform, he became known as "the dentist" and was sought after for his treatments. He performed simple dental procedures including draining a fistula and cleaning gums with iodine. His bright red box, containing his dental tools, became "his passport to survival".

At Buchenwald and Mittelbau-Dora concentration camps, he was involved in building V-1 flying bombs and V-2 rockets.

Once at Auschwitz with his father and brother (Josek), he was appointed to the dental station to treat SS men and was also given the job of extracting gold from the corpses of people murdered by the Nazis. It was hard to do and he recounted "I heard the voices of broken hearts and crushed souls". He also witnessed the selection processes and labouring in the mines. Despite saving extra rations for his family, his father died. At Auschwitz, he also crossed paths with Adolf Eichmann. Jacobs has been recalled in the memoirs of Sam Pivnik, another Holocaust survivor who described his experiences at Fürstengrube subcamp.

He survived the Royal Air Force attack on the ocean liners turned into prison camps, the SS Cap Arcona, SS Thielbek and the SS Deutschland in the Bay of Lubeck in 1945.

After the Second World War was over, Jacobs toured the United States and other places to share his experiences and speak of the people he had tried to help, but did not write his memoirs until he was in his eighties. At the time, he was suffering from cancer of the throat.

== The Dentist of Auschwitz: A Memoir ==
Jacobs wrote his memoirs which were published by the University Press of Kentucky in 1995. The Dentist of Auschwitz: A Memoir recounts his experiences and revulsion at having to strip gold from prisoners at Auschwitz in exchange for extra provisions for his family.

The book has been acknowledged as a unique witness account of the "perverted way of life" at Auschwitz and has been used as a case study to examine the traumas and ethical dilemmas faced by Jews who held "privileged" positions in the ghettos and concentration camps.

He writes in the book that "Jews were verbally abused and often beaten in broad daylight". It has been described as a "hard read", but a valuable first-hand testimony of dentistry in Auschwitz. Defined as having "Wieselian darkness", it has been compared to Night, a novella by Elie Wiesel.

== The 100-Year Secret: Britain's Hidden WWII massacre ==
Jacobs and Eugene Pool authored The 100-Year Secret : Britain's Hidden WWII Massacre, published by The Lyons Press in 2004, in which Jacobs gives a first hand account of the Cap Arcona disaster, one of a few known memoirs of the incident.

He was rescued by a motorized fishing boat.

== Death ==
Jacobs died on 30 January 2004.

== Publications ==
- The Dentist of Auschwitz: A Memoir. University Press of Kentucky, 1995. ISBN 0813118735
- The 100-year secret : Britain's hidden WWII massacre, The Lyons Press (2004), ISBN 9781592285327.

== See also ==
- Martin Hellinger
