= Steven Jacobs (footballer) =

Belgian footballer

Personal information
- Date of birth: 6 June 1987 (age 39)
- Place of birth: Jette, Belgium
- Height: 1.84 m (6 ft 0 in)
- Position: Midfielder

Youth career
- ?–2004: R.S.C. Anderlecht
- 2004–2005: Borussia Mönchengladbach

Senior career*
| Years | Team | Apps | (Gls) |
| 2005–2008 | Borussia M'gladbach II | 18 | (0) |
| 2008–2009 | FCV Dender EH | 20 | (1) |
| 2009–2010 | KSK Beveren | 32 | (2) |
| 2010–2011 | Waasland-Beveren | 31 | (1) |
| 2011–2012 | FCV Dender EH | 22 | (0) |
| 2012–2013 | TK Meldert | | |
| 2013-2014 | Olsa Brakel | | |
| 2014-2015 | Denderzonen Pamel | | |
- * Club domestic league appearances and goals as of 6 December 2015

Steven Jacobs (born 6 June 1987) is a Belgian former footballer who played for clubs including FCV Dender EH.
