= David Jacobs (sociologist) =

American sociologist

- Education: University of Georgia (B.A., 1968), Vanderbilt University (M.A., 1972; Ph.D., 1975)
- Scientific career
- Fields: Political sociology
- Workplaces: Ohio State University
- Thesis: Economic inequality, state policies, and crime rates (1975)

David Jacobs is an American sociologist and professor emeritus of sociology at Ohio State University. He is known for his work in political sociology and political economy, which has included research on issues such as labor relations, policing, and capital punishment. For example, his research has found that death sentences are most common in U.S. states where lynchings were formerly the most frequent, and that black death row inmates convicted of killing whites are more likely to be executed than whites convicted of killing blacks. Jacobs also noted that U.S. states with the largest African American minorities were more likely to maintain the death penalty.
