= Mike Jacobs =

Mike Jacobs may refer to:

== Sports ==
- Mike Jacobs (first baseman) (born 1980), American baseball player; first North American in professional sports to be tested positive for HGH
- Mike Jacobs (shortstop) (1877–1949), played for the Chicago Cubs
- Mike Jacobs (American football) (born c. 1978), American football coach
- Mike Jacobs (boxing) (1880–1953), American boxing promoter and member of the International Boxing Hall of Fame

== Politics ==
- Mike Jacobs (Georgia politician), representing District 80 in the Georgia House of Representatives
- Mike Jacobs (Illinois politician) (born 1960), Illinois State Senator
- Mike Jacobs (Maryland politician), member of the Maryland House of Delegates

== Others ==
- Mike Jacobs, guitarist and songwriter for bands including The Pasties and Evil Jake
- Mike Jacobs, former news anchor for WTMJ-TV in Milwaukee from 1977 to 2015

== See also ==
- Michael Jacobs (disambiguation)
- Michael Jacob (born 1980), Irish hurling player
