= Harold R. Jacobs =

American author

Harold R. Jacobs (born 1939), who authored three mathematics books, both taught the subject and taught those who teach it. Since retiring he has continued writing articles, and as of 2012 had lectured "at more than 200" math conferences.

His books have been used by some homeschoolers and has inspired followup works.

== Biography ==
Jacobs was born in North Hollywood and while in high school "realized that he wanted to become a teacher." The 1939-born educator began "in the late 1960s" what became his first book, originally published in 1970, as an attempt to address the needs of "those students who had not done well in mathematics." His works helped inspire other educators to extend areas such as "inquiry-based learning." He chaired a high school math department in California for 12 years.

== Works ==
- (1970): Mathematics: A Human Endeavor (revised 1982, 1994)
  - A student workbook for this was subsequently written by Susan Knueven Wong.
  - The 1994 edition was (re)titled as Mathematics, a Human Endeavor: A Textbook for Those Who Think They Don't Like the Subject. Jacobs' approach, described as ahead of its time, was to introduce concepts in an entertaining yet practical way. Jacobs' description of the mathematics of billiards inspired a teacher to write a simulation in the Logo educational computer programming language to help improve both his understanding and his teaching.
- (1974): Geometry: Seeing, Doing, Understanding (revised 1987, 2003). The 2003 edition makes reference to computer software such as The Geometer's Sketchpad. Even before this edition, the Teacher's notes for Geometry was used for developing new ways of teaching. One instructor credited the book's success to being "mathematically very sound" yet using a "little by little" approach.
- (1979): Elementary Algebra (revised 2016) The style of gently introducing new topics ahead of time, with details in a subsequent chapter, while accepted in homeschooling, has those who disagree for its use in classrooms.
- several articles for Encyclopædia Britannica and The Mathematics Teacher.

The three books were published by W. H. Freeman and Company, and "overhead transparencies for" classroom use were subsequently developed. The Elementary Algebra text has attracted interest by homeschoolers, particularly when used in conjunction with an independently produced set of DVDs offering 36 hours of educational instruction.
