= George Jacobs (basketball) =

American basketball player-coach (1900–1968)

Biographical details
- Born: February 23, 1900; Hudson, Massachusetts, U.S.
- Died: May 19, 1969 (aged 69); Winooski, Vermont, U.S.

Playing career

Football
- 1924–1926: Villanova

Basketball
- 1923–1926: Villanova

Baseball
- c. 1925: Villanova

Coaching career (HC unless noted)

Football
- 1929: Villanova (assistant)
- 1947–1953: Saint Michael's

Basketball
- 1929–1936: Villanova
- 1947–1948: Saint Michael's
- 1952–1964: Saint Michael's

Baseball
- 1933–1943: Villanova
- 1948–1956: Saint Michael's

Administrative career (AD unless noted)
- 1947–1968: Saint Michael's

Head coaching record
- Overall: 28–8–2 (football); 220–164 (basketball); 139–95–1

George W. "Doc" Jacobs (February 23, 1900 – May 19, 1968) was an American coach and athletic director. He served as the third head men's basketball coach at Villanova University from 1929 to 1936. A three-sport star in football, basketball and baseball at Villanova in the mid-1920s, Jacobs later became the school's baseball coach from 1933 to 1943, with a Villanova won-loss record of 106–37.

After World War II in 1947, Jacobs moved to the Burlington, Vermont suburb of Winooski, where he became the athletic director at Saint Michael's College, serving in that and other athletic capacities until his death in 1968. Jacobs served as the school's baseball coach from 1948 through 1956, but it was as the school's basketball coach in the 1950s and early 1960s that he established St. Michael's NCAA Division II program, winning 159 games over a 12-year span and going to the NCAA National Division II tournament in Evansville, Indiana for three straight seasons, 1958 to 1960. He also served as the school's football coach. His 1951 "Purple Knights" went 6–0 and were declared "New England Champions".

Jacobs died of a heart attack on May 19, 1968, at the age of 68, at his home in Winooski, Vermont.

St. Michael's honors the memory of "Doc" annually, with their basketball season-opening tournament called "The Doc Jacobs Classic" and their athletic fields are named "Doc" Jacobs Field. Jacobs is considered "the father of modern day St. Michael's College Athletics".

In 2014, Jacobs was posthumously inducted into the Vermont Sports Hall of Fame.
