= Michael Jacobs (art and travel writer) =

Italian writer (1952–2014)

Michael Jacobs (15 October 1952 – 11 January 2014) was a writer of Irish and Italian ancestry, born in Genoa, with particular interest in travel, the history of art, Spain, which he cultivated in his time at Westminster School, Latin America and gastronomy. His most successful popular work in both English and Spanish has been The Factory of Light: Tales from my Andalucian Village (2004), a true story but with a flavour of the magical realism of Gabriel García Márquez.

== Writing ==
Jacobs' writing initially specialised in introducing Fine Art to the general reader. He continued with these works but latterly produced books which capture the day-to-day life especially of Latin countries and relate that to an historical and political context. He wrote The Factory of Light which is close to the popular current genre of the English emigre setting up home in Southern Europe. His other books such as Between Hopes and Memories provide a snapshot of Spain in the post-transition economic boom of the 1990s. His classic travel writing include the semi-autobiographical Ghost Train Through the Andes and The Andes.

== Publications ==
- Mythological Painting (1979)
- Nude Painting in the History of Art (1979)
- Guide to European Painting (1980)
- Companion to Art and Artists in the British Isles (1980)
- The Knopf Traveler's Guides to Art: France (1984)
- Traveller's Guide to Art: Great Britain and Ireland Mitchell Beazley Traveller's Guides to Art (1984)
- Good and Simple Life: Artist Colonies in Europe and America (1985)
- A Guide to Provence (1988)
- A Guide to Andalucia (1990)
- The Road to Santiago de Compostela Architectural Guides for Travellers (1991)
- Barcelona Blue Guide (1992)
- Czechoslovakia Blue Guide (1992)
- The Most Beautiful Villages of Provence (1994)
- Madrid: Architecture, History, Art (Philip's City Guide (1992)
- Between Hopes and Memories: Spanish Journey (1994)
- The Painted Voyage: Art, Travel and Exploration, 1564-1875 (1995)
- Andalucia Pallas Guide (2003)
- In The Glow Of The Phantom Palace (2003)
- Madrid for Pleasure (2003)
- The Factory of Light: Tales From My Andalucian Village (2004)
- Alhambra (2005)
- Ghost Train Through the Andes: On My Grandfather's Trail in Chile and Bolivia (2006)
- The Andes (2010)
- The Robber of Memories: A River Journey Through Colombia (2012)
- Everything is Happening: Journey Into a Painting (posthumously, with an introduction and code by Ed Vulliamy) (2015)

== Translations ==
- The Jewess of Toledo (La judía de Toledo), Lope de Vega (2001)
- The Innocent Child of La Guardia (El niño inocente de La Guardia, Lope de Vega (2001)
- The Labyrinth of Desire (La prueba de los ingenios), Lope de Vega (2001)
