= Art Jacobs =

American baseball player (1902–1967)

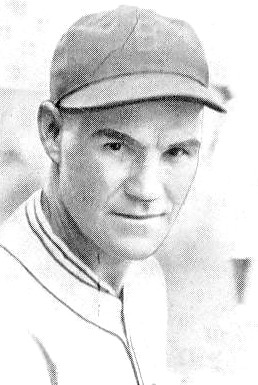
- Jacobs in 1940
- Pitcher
- Born: August 28, 1902; Luckey, Ohio, U.S.
- Died: June 8, 1967 (aged 64); Inglewood, California, U.S.
- Batted: Left Threw: Left

MLB debut
- June 18, 1939, for the Cincinnati Reds

Last MLB appearance
- June 18, 1939, for the Cincinnati Reds

MLB statistics
- Games pitched: 1
- Innings pitched: 1
- Win–loss record: 0–0
- Earned run average: 9.00
- Strikeouts: 0
- Stats at Baseball Reference

Teams
- Cincinnati Reds (1939)

Arthur Evan Jacobs (August 28, 1902 – June 8, 1967) was an American pitcher in Major League Baseball. He played for the Cincinnati Reds in 1939. He is the oldest player who played in only one Major League Baseball game. Although not recognized as an official statistic until after his death, he is credited with a save for his 1-inning MLB career.
