= Bruce Jacobs (radio host) =

American sports talk radio show host

Bruce Jacobs (born 1964), is an American sports talk radio show host. Since September 23, 2019, Jacobs co-hosts the 'Bruce Jacobs and Helly Show' with Dale Hellestrae on KQFN 1580 The Fanatic in Phoenix, Arizona from 5:30 a.m. to 9 a.m. on weekdays.

== On-air career ==
Jacobs' career began on Long Island at WNYG 1440 AM in Babylon, New York, where he did drive-time sports, as well as hosting the "Sunday Night Sports-Wrap" program.

He then moved to Phoenix where he co-hosted a local sports talk show with Mike Golic, now of ESPN Radio fame, on KFYI's sister station. Jacobs was also a cohost of the alternative lifestyle driven Mens Room radio program on One on One Sports. While Jacobs was usually on during the weekends he occasionally filled in for Ben Maller when Maller was on vacation or filling in for other hosts on the network.

Topics on The Bruce Jacobs Show, which almost always were colored by Jacobs' unique brand of comedy, usually consisted of local politics and news stories, and occasionally sports. He often co-hosted his show with producer Karilyn "with a K" Frazier, with input from the show's technical director and Cardinal fan Andrew Babinski.

Jacobs was a host on "NewsTalk 550" KFYI in Phoenix, Arizona. His show aired Monday through Friday from 5 to 8 a.m. Additionally, Jacobs hosted an afternoon sports talk show on KFYI's sister station XTRA Sports 910 (KGME) with Vince Marotta and a syndicated weekend sports talk show on Fox Sports Radio.

Jacobs is a diehard Mets and Jets fan, and calls himself "the world's biggest Dolphin and Yankee hater." He is also not shy in expressing his opinion of the Arizona Cardinals, a topic that came up often on his sports show. For this reason he is often labeled as a Cardinals hater.

In June 2009, the Phoenix Police Department boycotted Jacobs advertisers after he said on-air that a police officer who was murdered on the job would be "ashamed" of his wife for her immigration activism. Jacobs mutually parted ways with KFYI on June 9, 2009. Karilyn "with a K" Frazier left on the same day.

Jacobs was on Sporting News Radio in the evening. However, he was released by the network December 2010.

For nearly two years, Jacobs hosted Game On with Bruce Jacobs from 4 to 7 p.m. on WTMM-FM ESPN Radio 104.5 The Team, in New York's Capital Region. His first show aired on September 20, 2011, and his final show was on September 6, 2013, after his contract was not renewed.

In December 2011, Jacobs came under heat for anti-gay comments he made on the air when talking about the Los Angeles Sparks and Phoenix Mercury, referring to them as the Los Angeles Lesbians and Phoenix Dyke-ury. Jacobs later apologized after facing pressure from gay rights groups and the media.

In August 2013, Albany, New York station WTMM (104.5 FM) announced that Jacobs's contract would not be renewed. Jacobs said of the station's decision, "If there's no broadcasting involved (in the future), then that's the way it goes. I would hope I can do other things."

In January 2014, Jacobs restarted Game On with Bruce Jacobs in a live-stream weekly format hosted by the Rockford Register Star.

Jacobs' return to the Phoenix airwaves occurred on September 23, 2019, when he and Hellestrae took the morning window on KQFN. Jacobs was called an “icon in the Valley sports arena who still has a lot of fans” as KQFN looked to chip away at market share typically dominated by KMVP-FM Arizona Sports. Jacobs and Hellestrae host a daily segment with Mark Asher, a former co-host with John Gambadoro on KMVP. The duo also talks weekly with the head coach of the Grand Canyon Antelopes men's basketball program.
