= Danie Jacobs =

South African middle-distance runner

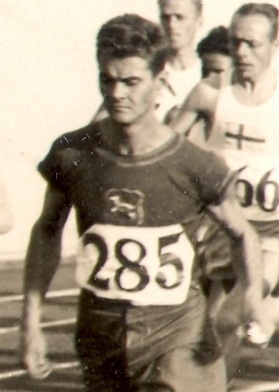
- Danie Jacobs in 1928

Personal information
- Nationality: South African
- Born: 10 April 1904 Kuruman, Cape Colony
- Died: 21 June 1999 (aged 95)

Sport
- Sport: Middle-distance running
- Event: 1500 metres

Danie Jacobs (10 April 1904 – 21 June 1999) was a South African middle-distance runner. He competed in the men's 1500 metres at the 1928 Summer Olympics.
