= Andrew Jacobs (journalist) =

American journalist

- Born: Newark, New Jersey, U.S.
- Education: New York University
- Occupation: Journalist
- Employer: The New York Times
- Known for: Directed and produced Four Seasons Lodge (2008), a documentary
- Awards: Part of team of reporters that won Pulitzer Prize for Public Service for coverage of the September 11 attack in Manhattan (2002); Part of team of reporters that won Pulitzer Prize for Breaking News Reporting (2009); "Honorable mention" by The Society of Publishers in Asia for coverage of the government's crackdown on dissent during the Beijing Olympics (2009); "Honorable mention" by The Society of Publishers in Asia for Uneasy Engagement, with several other New York Times writers (2010)

Andrew Jacobs is an American correspondent for The New York Times. He has been based in Beijing, China, since April 2008, covering the country for The New York Times. He is also the director and producer of a 2008 documentary, Four Seasons Lodge.

== Early life ==
Jacobs, who is Jewish and one of three children, was born in Newark, New Jersey, to Martin G. Jacobs, a nephrologist, and Barbara Jacobs. His sisters are Wendy, a county commissioner in Durham, North Carolina, and Ellen, a psychotherapist in Manhattan, New York City. He grew up in South Orange, New Jersey. He graduated from Columbia High School, and from New York University, where he studied architecture and urban design.

In 1989, Jacobs was an English teacher at Hubei University in Wuhan, China. He served as press secretary for Tom Duane during his successful run for the New York City Council in 1991.

== Journalism career ==
Jacobs contributed to the Associated Press, The Village Voice, and New York Newsday during the 1989 Tiananmen Square protests and massacre. Later, he served as editor of Manhattan Spirit and Our Town, founded and was news editor of QW magazine, and edited a number of New York City newsweeklies, including The Brooklyn Phoenix and The Villager.

He began writing for The New York Times in 1995. He has reported for various New York Times desks, including National, Business, Culture, and Styles. In April 2008, he served as a New York Times correspondent in Beijing, China. His writing focuses on Chinese politics, including Uighur-Han Chinese relations, Chen Guangcheng's escape, and the loss of power of Bo Xilai. He returned to the US in 2016 and now covers international health issues for the organization.

=== Awards ===
In 2002, he was part of a team of reporters who won a Pulitzer Prize for Public Service for coverage of the September 11 attacks in Manhattan. In 2009, Jacobs was part of a team of reporters that won the Pulitzer Prize for Breaking News Reporting related to the Eliot Spitzer prostitution scandal.

In 2009, the Society of Publishers in Asia (SOPA) acknowledged his coverage of the government's crackdown on dissent during the Beijing Olympics entitled "In the Shadow of the Olympics" with an honorable mention in the category Excellence in Human Rights Reporting. In 2010, SOPA acknowledged him and several other New York Times writers with the Award for Excellence in the category Excellence in Feature Writing for Uneasy Engagement, a 10-part series that explored China's growing influence in the world. In 2011, he and a group of New York Times reporters were finalists for a Gerald Loeb Award, for their reporting on Google's clash with the Chinese government over censorship issues.

== Film career ==
Jacobs directed and produced Four Seasons Lodge, a feature-length 2008 documentary shot two years prior. It is about a group of elderly Jewish Holocaust survivors spending the summer at a 44-acre (180,000 m^{2}) vacation bungalow colony in Ellenville in the Catskills in upstate New York prior to the property being sold. The documentary is based on material he wrote for a series in the New York Times "Metro" section.

Rather than interviewing the participants, Jacobs filmed them interacting with one another. Academy Award-nominated Albert Maysles was one of four cinematographers who worked on the film. They shot 250 hours of film to create the 97-minute documentary.

The film opened at the Hamptons International Film Festival in October 2008. It won the Audience Award for Best Documentary at the Miami Jewish Film Festival.
