= Dan Jacobs (trumpeter) =

American jazz musician (born 1942)

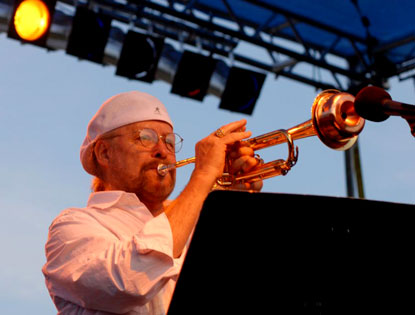

Background information
- Born: Daniel Wright Jacobs; May 20, 1942 (age 84); Bellaire, Michigan, U.S.
- Genres: Jazz
- Instruments: Trumpet, flugelhorn
- Years active: 1966–present
- Label: Metro Jazz Records
- Website: www.danjacobsmusic.com

Daniel Wright Jacobs (born May 20, 1942) is an American jazz trumpeter and flugelhorn player.

== Career ==
Jacobs has performed in concert with public touring acts such as Bob James, John Pizzarelli, Maria Schneider, Woody Herman, Mel Tormé, Wayne Newton, Linda Ronstadt, Aaron Neville, Gladys Knight, Frank Sinatra, Jr., The Four Tops, Johnny Mathis, Bobby Vinton, Al Green, The Lawrence Welk Orchestra, The Gene Krupa Orchestra, Kenny Rogers, Billy Dean, The Lettermen, Allen Vizzutti, the U.S. Navy Band, and others. He performed in over 500 shows with the touring production of Jesus Christ Superstar. Jacobs and his brother Chuck Jacobs own an independent record label, Simplicity Records, for which they have produced over 30 CDs. Jacobs latest CD, "Play Song" hit No. 34 on JazzWeek Charts.

== Selected discography ==
- Play Song Dan Jacobs Quartet (2011), (Dan Jacobs, tpt, Gerard Hagen, pno, Peter Pfiefer, dms, Ernie Nunez, bs)
- Singin' & Swingin' by vocalist Ellen Murry (2008)
- Eileen by vocalist Eileen Bertsch (2005)
- Blue After Hours Dan Jacobs Quartet (2005), (Dan Jacobs, Chuck Jacobs, Rod Jacobs, Randy Dorman)
- Aventurière Accidentelle by vocalist, songwriter Danielle Hébert (2003)
- Jazz Standard Time The Jacobs Brothers (2003), (Dan Jacobs, tp; Chuck Jacobs, bs; Rod Jacobs, dms; Randy Dorman, gt)
- Future Memories Dan, pno, flute, comp. and Chuck Jacobs, bs, pno, comp. (1992)
- Dream Sketches Dan, pno, flute, comp. and Chuck Jacobs, bs, pno, comp. (1991)
- Big Band Super Charles Rutherford Big Band (1988)
- The Brothers Jacobs (1985) Dan Jacobs, tpt, Chuck Jacobs, bs, John Novello, pno, Tom Brechlein, dms
- The Sound Gathering (1968) Kenny Gordon, vocals, Dan Jacobs, tp, flute, Greg Hopkins, tp, arr., Jeff Kressler, tb, Rod Jacobs, dms, Denis Solee, sax, flute, vocals, Chuck Jacobs, bs
