= Gary Jacobs (solicitor) =

Gary Jacobs (1946–2 July 2002) was a British solicitor best known for his media appearances and columns, in which he gave "no-nonsense" advice.

He owned Gary Jacobs Mehta & Co, a solicitors firm in Newbury Park.

He had a column in the Daily Mirror called "Justice with Jacobs" and then one in the Daily Express called "New Crusader". He appeared on various TV shows and worked on Talk Radio UK with his own legal hour and took part in some shows with the football agent Eric Hall and Caesar the Geezer.

Jacobs died of a heart attack after surgery at the age of 56.
