= Harold M. Jacobs =

American Jewish and civic leader

Harold Milton Jacobs (October 25, 1912 – May 18, 1995) was a Jewish and civic leader who headed a number of American Jewish organizations and institutions, and also played a significant role in New York City educational affairs.

== Personal life ==
=== Childhood and education ===
Jacobs was born in the Williamsburg section of Brooklyn, the second of four children of Max Jacobs (1883–1978), an immigrant from Austro-Hungary, and his American-born wife, Kate (Kayla) Fried Jacobs (1890–1982). Max and his siblings were the founders and proprietors of Detecto Scales, which supplied scales and knives to local butchers.

Max and Kate became active in Jewish community affairs, helping to found a synagogue, Young Israel of Eastern Parkway, and the first mikveh (ritualarium) in Crown Heights, the Brooklyn neighborhood to which the Jacobs family relocated in the early 1930s.

For elementary school, Jacobs attended Torah Vodaas, the first all-day Orthodox Jewish school in the neighborhood. For his high school education, Harold, like most of his peers, attended Boys High School, supplemented by private tutoring in Judaic subjects.

In the autumn of 1929, Jacobs enrolled in the business program at St. John's College, attending classes at night while working during the day at a butcher supplies store that his father opened in Crown Heights. Jacobs's education was interrupted by complications from a sports-related injury to his leg, which resulted in hospitalization for nearly a year and multiple surgeries. After finishing his B.A., he went to graduate school at Columbia University, earning a master's degree in economics.

=== Marriage and early career ===
In 1932, Jacobs met Pearl Schraub (1912–1993), a secretary in his father's company who likewise was the daughter of an Austrian immigrant and his American-born wife. They were married in 1935, settled in Crown Heights, and had three children, Vivian (1939 -), Joseph (1943-), and Paul (1945 -).

With a loan from his father, Jacobs transformed the butcher supplies store into Precision Metal Products, a manufacturer first of frying pans and then airplane parts. Entering the field just as the United States Postal Service was beginning to use airplanes and commercial airplane companies were expanding, Precision proved to be a huge success. During World War II — Jacobs was exempt from service because of his leg injury — Precision supplied airplane parts to the U.S. military.

After the war, he sold the company and launched Precisionware, a manufacturer of wooden kitchen cabinets, which were in great demand during the postwar surge of suburban home construction. With factories in Pennsylvania and Florida, Precisionware blossomed into the second-largest cabinet manufacturer in the United States. By 1961, it was listed on the American Stock Exchange.

== Civic leader ==
=== Brooklyn Jewish communal life ===
Jacobs was deeply devoted to the importance preserving Orthodox Jewish life in the face of pressures to assimilate. He was committed to the principle that it was possible to simultaneously maintain a religious observant lifestyle and participate in American society. This was no easy task in an era when Blue Laws discouraged Saturday Sabbath observance, few kosher products were available in supermarkets, and kosher restaurants were a rarity, especially outside New York City.

Jacobs served in leadership roles in an array of Orthodox institutions. He was president of Young Israel of Eastern Parkway from 1949 to 1953, president of the Crown Heights Yeshiva from 1953 to 1968, and even helped lead a local Sabbath-observant boy scout troop. He became an officer, and eventually president, of the Brooklyn Jewish Community Council. He also served on the board of directors of the Torah Vodaas and Chaim Berlin day schools, chaired the annual dinners of the local Lubavitcher and Bobover yeshivas and the Brooklyn Joint Passover Committee, and served as vice-president of the Yeshiva of Eastern Parkway.

The Jewish Press, a Brooklyn-based Jewish weekly newspaper, remarked in 1966 that Jacobs was "active in every major and minor Jewish organization in Brooklyn." Jacobs's involvement in Brooklyn Jewish communal life was so extensive that he was widely known as "the mayor of Crown Heights."

Beginning in 1952, Jacobs assumed a leading role in the Orthodox community's campaign for the abolition of New York State's Blue Law, which mandated the closing of businesses on Sundays. As chairman of the Joint Committee for a Fair Sabbath Law, Jacobs led delegations of Jewish leaders to Albany to lobby legislators on the issue, and worked hard to mobilize Christian support for abolition of the law. Jacobs utilized his contacts in the Madison Club, the key local Democratic Party branch in Brooklyn, to advance the Sabbath Law effort. The campaign represented one of the earliest organized forays by Orthodox Jews into the world of American political lobbying. They achieved a partial victory in 1963, when the state legislature agreed to permit businesses in New York City to open on Sundays. Two years later, the rule was extended to the rest of the state.

=== New leadership roles ===
In 1964, with Precisionware at the peak of its success, Jacobs sold the company to a large conglomerate, Triangle-Pacific Forest Products. Stepping away from the daily grind of managing company affairs, Jacobs turned his attention to a series of a new projects. He assumed a leadership role in “Commerce, Labor, Industry Corporation of Kings County,” or CLICK, a group of local businessmen working to revitalize the Brooklyn Navy Yard; he was appointed, by New York Governor Nelson Rockefeller, to the Advisory Committee of the New York State Small Business Administration (1965); and he was named, by Mayor John Lindsay, to the New York City Youth Board (1970).

At the same time, Jacobs became increasingly active in a national Jewish organization, the Union of Orthodox Jewish Congregations of America (OU), which is the umbrella group for modern Orthodox synagogues and also functions as the largest supervisor of kosher food products in the United States.

As the voice of Orthodox Judaism in such national Jewish forums as the Conference of Presidents of Major American Jewish Organizations, the National Jewish Community Relations Advisory Council, and the Synagogue Council of America, the OU took the Orthodox viewpoint out of the narrow confines of Brooklyn and brought it into the halls of political power, both within and beyond the Jewish community. Jacobs was invited to join the OU board of directors in 1958, soon afterwards was elevated to the post of vice president, and would, in 1967, become chairman of its board, the second most powerful position in the organization.

=== National Jewish leadership ===
Meanwhile, Jacobs assumed an increasingly prominent role in the work of the Orthodox Union. His first major success was in compelling Jewish funeral homes to agree to a set of uniform standards that helped ensure less expensive burials and stricter adherence to Jewish religious laws pertaining to the deceased. In 1972, Jacobs was elected president of the OU.

Jacobs inherited an organization in difficult financial straits, and devoted much of his early presidential tenure to fundraising. As the OU returned to financial health, he was able to focus on his educational and programming agenda, at the top of which was the goal of expanding outreach to young American Jews with little or no background in Judaism.

This was at a time when outreach efforts by groups such as Chabad and Aish HaTorah were still in their infancy. The OU's National Conference of Synagogue Youth (NCSY) set up chapters around the country, run primarily by the teenagers themselves, which offered educational activities and, in particular, Shabbatons. These weekend experiences, with their strong combination of religious and social appeal, proved extremely successful and helped groom numerous future Jewish community activists, educators, and leaders. Many senior officials of the OU itself started out as NCSY participants.

Jacobs regarded NCSY as a critical component in the process of both preserving and expanding Orthodox Judaism in America. During the years of his precedence, he presided over what one of his colleagues characterized as “the largest growth and expansion of NCSY in its history.” He also participated in many NCSY gatherings around the country, in order to establish a personal rapport with attendees.

During the Jacobs presidency, the OU Center was opened in Israel, and the Zula project was begun to open a drop-in center in Jerusalem for troubled or socially disadvantaged teens.

=== Struggle over the Synagogue Council of America ===
Jacobs's rise in the OU leadership coincided with a growing conflict over the organization's membership in the Synagogue Council of America. The council had been established in 1925 as a means for the Reform, Conservative, and Orthodox movements to present a united Jewish position to the outside world. In the 1950s the make-up of the American Orthodox community began to change, due to an influx of postwar European immigrants who identified with the more insular, or haredi, sector of the community. As a result, a growing number of Orthodox Jews began urging the OU to withdraw from the council, lest its participation be seen as granting de facto religious legitimacy to the non-Orthodox movements. Manhattanites and out-of-towners tended to favor continuing cooperation with the non-Orthodox groups, while Brooklynites, who were more deferential to haredi rabbinical leaders, tended to favor withdrawing from the council.

Jacobs sympathized with the advocates of withdrawal but in his role as president of an organization with a large anti-withdrawal faction, refrained from openly campaigning to pull out of the council. A resolution at the 1966 OU national convention asking for withdrawal from the council was defeated, 74 to 16. By early 1974, however, opposition to the council reached the point that the OU's board of directors voted to suspend the organization's participation in the council until a full debate and vote were held at the next convention. Jacobs' personal papers state that the withdrawal, albeit short term, was "over the debate surrounding 'Who is a Jew?'".

At the November 1974 assembly, following what the New York Times called "a stormy debate," Jacobs brokered a compromise whereby the delegates voted to create a 40-man commission to study the issue further. They ultimately recommended staying in the council, and in March 1975, an expanded meeting of the OU board of directors voted 68 to 56 to resume the organization's participation in the Synagogue Council.

=== Jews and the Democratic Party ===
Jacobs became involved in American politics through the Madison Club, a Democratic Party machine in Brooklyn that addressed local needs while grooming future city and state political leaders. He became close to future New York City mayor Abraham Beame and future New York State Assembly leader Stanley Steingut, among others. Jacobs himself briefly was a candidate for the New York State Senate in 1958.

The relationship between New York City's Jewish community and the Democratic Party became strained in the 1960s and early 1970s as many Jews began to perceive the Democratic leadership as weak in response to black militants, campus unrest, and crime. When the staunchly liberal George McGovern won the Democratic presidential nomination in 1972, many Jews, apparently including Jacobs, voted for a Republican for president for the first time in their lives.

U.S.-Israel relations soon became another flashpoint for tensions between the Jewish community and the Democrats. In early 1976, the New York division of the Women's International League for Peace and Freedom, an overwhelmingly Democratic advocacy group, contacted a number of U.S. senators to protest their pro-Israel stance. Jacobs led a counter-protest effort, personally persuading Senator McGovern's wife, Eleanor, to resign from the group. These pressures persuaded the national League leadership to disavow the New York branch's actions.

Jacobs also repeatedly protested President Jimmy Carter's policies toward Israel. In 1978, the OU attempted, unsuccessfully, to mobilize enough members of Congress to block Carter's sale of advanced jet fighters to Arab states. Jacobs strongly defended the positions of Israeli Prime Minister Menachem Begin and challenged American Jewish critics of Begin for undermining the Israeli government. He was also outspoken in support of the right of Jews to reside in the West Bank. “How in the name of human rights can we entertain the idea of prohibiting the people of the Bible from living in peaceably anywhere in the Land of the Bible?," he asked in one address.

=== Leader of Young Israel ===
After his final term as president of the OU in late 1978, Jacobs became active in another national Orthodox Jewish organization, the National Council of Young Israel, and was elected president in June 1981. Although smaller than the OU, the NCYI enabled Jacobs to maintain a position of influence in the American Orthodox leadership and made it possible for him to continue serving as a delegate to meetings of the Jerusalem-based Agency Executive, where funding and policy decisions often impacted issues of concern to Orthodox Jewry. As president of Young Israel, Jacobs initiated broader outreach efforts to Jews on college campuses and continued to speak out against U.S. pressure on Israel.

=== Board of Higher Education ===
In 1970, Jacobs was one of the founders of Medgar Evers College, a new branch of the City University of New York that would primarily serve African-American students in Brooklyn. In 1974, he was appointed by his friend, the newly elected Mayor Abraham Beame, to serve on the Board of Higher Education of the City of New York, also known as the Board of Trustees of the City University of New York; two years later, he became chairman of the board.

Jacobs advocated charging tuition for City University, "which began in 1975."

In August 1991, Prof. Leonard Jeffries, chairman of the African-American Studies department of the City College of New York publicly accused Jews of conspiring to bring about "the destruction of black people," When the 1991–1992 academic year ended the following June, the Board voted unanimously to replace Jeffries as chairman of the department, although that did not affect his position as a faculty members. Jeffries then sued the board, demanding reinstatement and $25-million in damages. The board members argued in court that they acted against Jeffries not because of his opinions but because of evidence of his incompetence as department chair. In May 1993, a jury found that Jacobs and five other board members guilty of depriving Jeffries of his right to free speech; they were singled out because in board meetings, they were the strongest advocates for taking action against Jeffries. The jury also awarded Jeffries $400,000 in punitive damages. In 1994–1995, however, appeals courts nullified the monetary award and overturned the conviction, vindicating the Board of Higher Education members. The final ruling was handed down just weeks before Jacobs died at age 83.

== Book and Personal Papers ==
A book about Jacobs' life was co-authored by his son Paul and American historian Rafael Medoff. Published in 2015, "Building Orthodox Judaism in America: The Life and Legacy of Harold M. Jacobs" covers details "the seven American generations in the 140 years since" Paul's "great-great-grandparents landed in New York." It covers many behind-the-scenes details affecting interactions among several Jewish organizations and how he helped grow internal units such as NCSY.

Jacob's Personal Papers reside at Yeshiva University Archives.

== Sources ==
- Harold M. Jacobs Papers, Yeshiva University Archives, New York City. (Harold Milton Jacobs)
- Rafael Medoff, "The Life and Legacy of Harold M. Jacobs" (Toronto: CreateSpace, 2015).
