= Michael J. Jacobs =

English photojournalist and director

- Born: 25 May 1952 (age 72); London, England
- Occupation(s): Photojournalist, film director, educator, writer, fine artist
- Spouse: Ruby Handler Jacobs
- Children: Daughter Georgiana Rose Jacobs
- Awards: International Family Film Festival - winner: Director's Gold Award.
- Website: http://www.mjphoto.com

Michael J. Jacobs (born 25 May 1952 in London, England) is an English photojournalist turned feature film director and motion picture studio owner.

Michael Jacobs has over four decades of professional experience as a photojournalist. Assignments have taken him to nearly 70 countries, in every continent. During the Vietnam War, Michael spent two years as a photojournalist and aircrewman in the U.S. Navy's elite Combat Camera Group. He later documented the opening of the new South Pole Station. With over thirty years photographing the entertainment industry, he has worked on more than 200 film, television, video and music productions. His photographic collection contains nearly two million images. Of these, more than 10,000 images and 500 articles have been published.

In 2004, along with his wife Ruby Handler Jacobs, they relocated to Albuquerque, New Mexico to assist in growing the fledgling film business. In 2005, he made his debut at the helm of award-winning Crab Orchard (now titled Sheeba) starring Edward Asner, Judge Reinhold and Ruby Handler Jacobs.
