= George Jacobs (inventor) =

American inventor

George Jacobs

George Jacobs (1877 – 1945) was an American inventor, who invented enamel insulation for magnet wire. He founded Dudlo Manufacturing, which became part of General Cable Corporation, and Inca Manufacturing, which became Phelps-Dodge Magnet Wire.

In 1901, George Jacobs was working as a chemist working in the General Electric factory in Fort Wayne, Indiana, where he met co-worker Ethel Mossman. In 1905, he moved to Cleveland, Ohio to take a position with Sherwin-Williams, and continued to work in his own time on an enamel insulation for magnet wire. In 1907, he perfected his formula, and asked Ethel to marry him, and join him in Cleveland, where he went into business in 1911 as Dudlo Manufacturing. The name came from Dudley. Massachusetts, where Jacobs was born, and Ohio.

Undercapitalized, and without business experience, Dudlo initially did not thrive. William Mossman, his father-in-law, came from a monied background. James Mossman had been the court jeweler for the Scottish king James VII, and William was owner of Mossman Yarnell hardware wholesalers. A lonely widower, he offered to back Jacobs in his venture, but demanded that they move back to Fort Wayne. With the help of William Mossman and Ethel's brother B. Paul Mossman, Dudlo built a factory on Wall Street in Fort Wayne, and opened their doors with a dozen employees in 1912.

Previously, magnet wire was insulated with cloth. Jacob's enamel insulation did not wear like cloth did, was less bulky, and more economical to produce. The enamel insulation was especially valuable for producing very thin wire. The company found a market eager for the product - especially the automotive industry, which found the wire indispensable for economical reliable ignition coils. The company's timing could hardly have been better, with the Model-T Ford coming out in 1910. In 1917, the company started drawing its own wire, and by 1922, was the largest manufacturer of magnet wire in the world.

In 1927, the General Cable Corporation was being formed, and fearing that the roaring 20s economy was a bubble that would soon burst, the Mossmans sold the company. Victor Rea, who had been with Dudlo almost from the start, became president of Dudlo in 1928 when Jacobs left the company to start a new business: INCA manufacturing.

Phelps Dodge bought INCA in 1930. Jacobs remained with Phelps Dodge for several more years, then moved to California with his wife, who was in ill health. He died in 1945.

General Cable closed the Fort Wayne offices of Dudlo in 1930 and moved the remainder of their Fort Wayne operations to Rome, New York in 1933. Essex Wire was formed and set up operations in the former Dudlo factory. Victor Rea joined with three co-workers to form Rea Magnet Wire.

In October, 2005, Rea Magnet Wire announced agreement had been reached to buy Phelps Dodge Magnet Wire.

The three Fort Wayne companies, Rea, Phelps Dodge Magnet Wire, and Essex account for 2/3 of the world's production of magnet wire (enamelled wire).
