= 2015 Il Lombardia =

2015 UCI World Tour, race 28 of 28
- Official event poster

Race details
- Dates: 4 October 2015
- Stages: 1
- Distance: 245 km (152.2 mi)
- Winning time: 6h 16' 28"

Results
	Winner	Vincenzo Nibali (ITA)	(Astana)
	Second	Daniel Moreno (ESP)	(Team Katusha)
	Third	Thibaut Pinot (FRA)	(FDJ)

The 2015 Il Lombardia (also known as the Giro di Lombardia or the Tour of Lombardy) was a one-day cycling classic that took place around Lake Como in Lombardy in northern Italy on 4 October 2015. It was the 109th edition of the Il Lombardia one-day cycling race and was the final cycling monument of the 2015 season, as well as being the final race of the 2015 UCI World Tour. The race was organised by RCS Sport, who also organise the Giro d'Italia.

The course was difficult, taking in several hard climbs over the 245-kilometre (152 mi) route, including the famous Madonna del Ghisallo climb. It started in Bergamo and reached the coast of Lake Como about halfway through the race. The final 75 kilometres (47 mi) contained most of the climbing, with the final climb coming in the last 10 kilometres (6.2 mi). This was followed by a descent to the finish line in Como itself.

Profile of the route

There was aggressive racing from the climb of the Madonna del Ghisallo and the very difficult Muro di Sormano that followed it. A small group came to the final climbs together. Vincenzo Nibali (Astana), who had targeted the race following his expulsion from the Vuelta a España, attacked on the penultimate descent. Despite losing some time to the chasers on the final climb, he came to the finish line alone to take his first ever Monument victory. Daniel Moreno (Team Katusha) was second, with Thibaut Pinot (FDJ) third.

== Background ==
Il Lombardia was the final race in the 2015 UCI World Tour. This was a change from recent years, when the Tour of Beijing was the final race. The individual victory in the World Tour had already been won by Alejandro Valverde (Movistar Team). Valverde had won two of the one-day classics that took place early in the season (La Flèche Wallonne and Liège–Bastogne–Liège) and took top ten places in both the Tour de France and the Vuelta a España. Team Katusha were leading the team rankings ahead of Movistar and Team Sky, while Spain were leading the country rankings ahead of Colombia and Great Britain.

Il Lombardia was also the last of a series of Italian classics. The most important of these came in two groups of three. The first three races formed the Trittico Lombardo: these were the Coppa Ugo Agostoni, the Coppa Bernocchi and the Tre Valli Varesine. Vincenzo Nibali (Astana) came second to Davide Rebellin (CCC–Sprandi–Polkowice) in the Coppa Ugo Agostoni, then won the remaining two races. The second group was the Trittico di Autunno: these were the Milano–Torino, the Gran Piemonte and Il Lombardia itself, which was the only one of the races to be part of the World Tour. Diego Rosa, Nibali's teammate, won the Milano–Torino.

== Teams ==
The seventeen UCI WorldTeams were automatically invited and obliged to attend the race. The race organisers, RCS Sport, also invited eight UCI Professional Continental teams to take part as wildcard entries. These included the five wildcard teams from the Giro d'Italia, four of which were Italian-based. UnitedHealthcare and Colombia received entries after being rejected for the Giro, with Bora–Argon 18 receiving the final place. Each team was expected to enter eight riders. Two riders failed to start the race, so the peloton initially comprised 198 riders. 99 riders finished the race.

The teams entering the race were:

World Tour teams

- AG2R La Mondiale
- Astana
- BMC Racing Team
- Cannondale–Garmin
- Etixx–Quick-Step
- FDJ
- Team Giant–Alpecin
- IAM Cycling
- Team Katusha
- Lampre–Merida
- LottoNL–Jumbo
- Lotto–Soudal
- Movistar Team
- Orica–GreenEDGE
- Team Sky
- Tinkoff–Saxo
- Trek Factory Racing

Professional Continental teams

- Southeast Pro Cycling
- Bardiani–CSF
- Nippo–Vini Fantini
- CCC–Sprandi–Polkowice
- UnitedHealthcare
- Colombia
- Bora–Argon 18
- Androni Giocattoli–Sidermec

== Route ==
The route for the 2015 Il Lombardia was announced on 11 September 2015, a little over three weeks before the race took place, with numerous changes from the previous year's route. The race took place in Lombardy in northern Italy on 4 October over a course that was 245 kilometres (152 mi) in length, with most of the difficult hills coming in the second half.

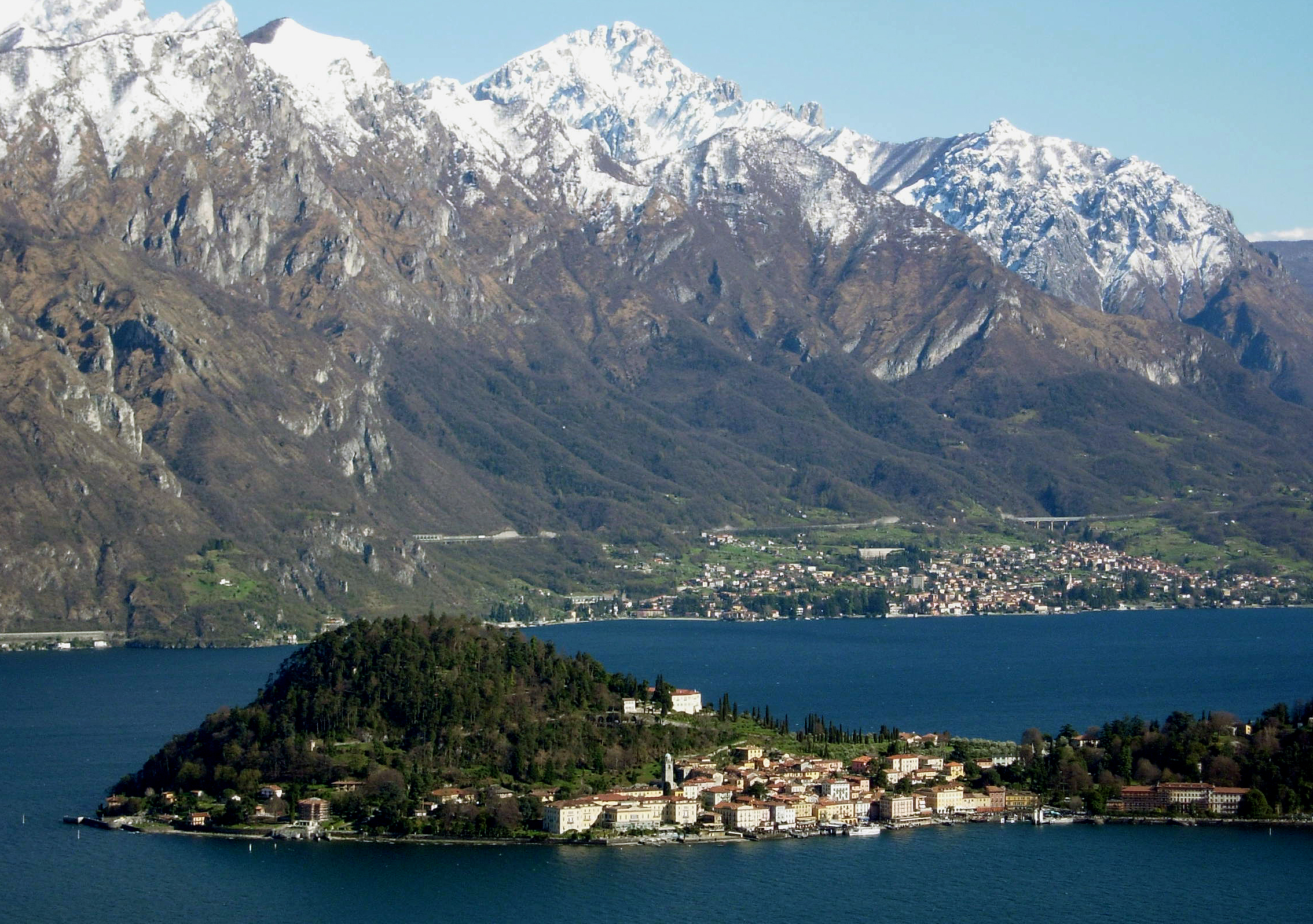
Bellagio on the shore of Lake Como

The route began in Bergamo, where the 2014 race had finished, on the Viale Papa Giovanni XXIII. There was a neutral zone that took the riders south and out of the city, before the racing started on the Via San Bernardino. After first heading south, the route turned to the east and then to the north. After 43.6 kilometres (27.1 mi) the riders reached Entratico, where they joined the main valley road heading north-east. The roads up to this point were almost entirely flat. 6 kilometres (3.7 mi) after joining the valley road, however, the route turned to the west to cross the first climb of the day, the Colle Gallo (7.4 kilometres (4.6 mi) at an average gradient of 6%). After the descent from the climb, the route continued west and returned to the outskirts of Bergamo. By this point the riders had completed 79 kilometres (49 mi) of racing.

The route left Bergamo again, this time to the north-west, and went past Valbrembo. After this the course turned west to come to the second climb of the day, the Colle Brianza. This was a moderate climb (approximately 3.9 kilometres (2.4 mi) at 4%) and the descent was followed by more flat roads that took the riders north towards Pescate, where they came to the shore of Lake Como for the first time. Here the course turned gradually back to the south, to pass along the eastern coast of the Lago di Annone and around its southern tip. This was approximately the half-way point in the race. The roads travelled north again, through Onno and to Bellagio, again riding along the coast of Lake Como. By this point the riders had covered 172 kilometres (107 mi). The remaining 73 kilometres (45 mi) were by far the hilliest and most difficult of the race.

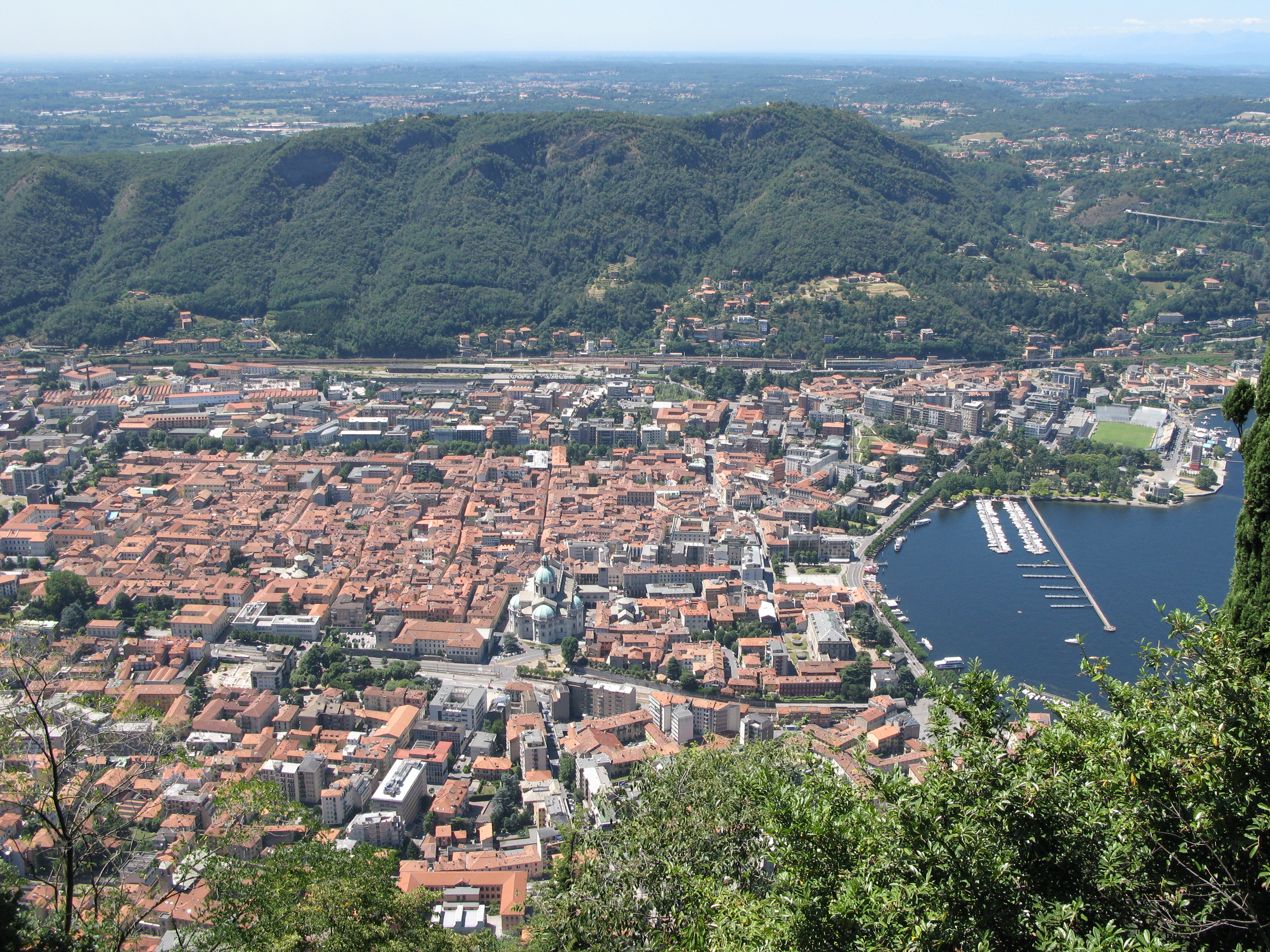
The view over Como from the top of the penultimate climb, the Civiglio. The final climb is in the background, while the finish line is on the shore of the lake.

The first climb was the Madonna del Ghisallo. This is an 8.6-kilometre (5.3 mi) climb, with an average gradient of 6.2%. The middle 3 kilometres (1.9 mi) of the climb are flat, however, so the remaining 5.6 kilometres (3.5 mi) had an average gradient of over 9% and sections as steep as 14%. Immediately after the descent, the riders faced the Colma di Sormano. The first 5 kilometres (3.1 mi) of the climb had an average gradient of 6.6%. After this came the Muro di Sormano (the "wall of Sormano"), which was a 1.9-kilometre (1.2 mi) section of road with an average gradient of 15.8% and sections of almost 30%. At the top of the climb there were 50.4 kilometres (31.3 mi) to the finish line.

After the descent back to the shores of Lake Como, there were around 16 kilometres (9.9 mi) of flat roads that took the riders south-west into Como itself. The riders only got as far as the eastern outskirts, however, before they turned to the east for the day's penultimate climb. This was the Civiglio (4.2 kilometres (2.6 mi) at 9.7%), the summit of which came with 16.6 kilometres (10.3 mi) to the finish. The riders then descended back into Como, which they reached with 10 kilometres (6.2 mi) remaining. The route left the town to the west and climbed the San Fermo della Battaglia (2.7 kilometres (1.7 mi) at 7.2%). The summit came with 5.3 kilometres (3.3 mi) remaining. There was then a descent back into town. The descent ended as the riders went under the flamme rouge with 1 kilometre (0.62 mi) remaining. There was a final corner with 600 metres (1,970 ft) to the finish line, which was on the Lungo Lario Trento on the shore of the lake.

== Pre-race favourites ==
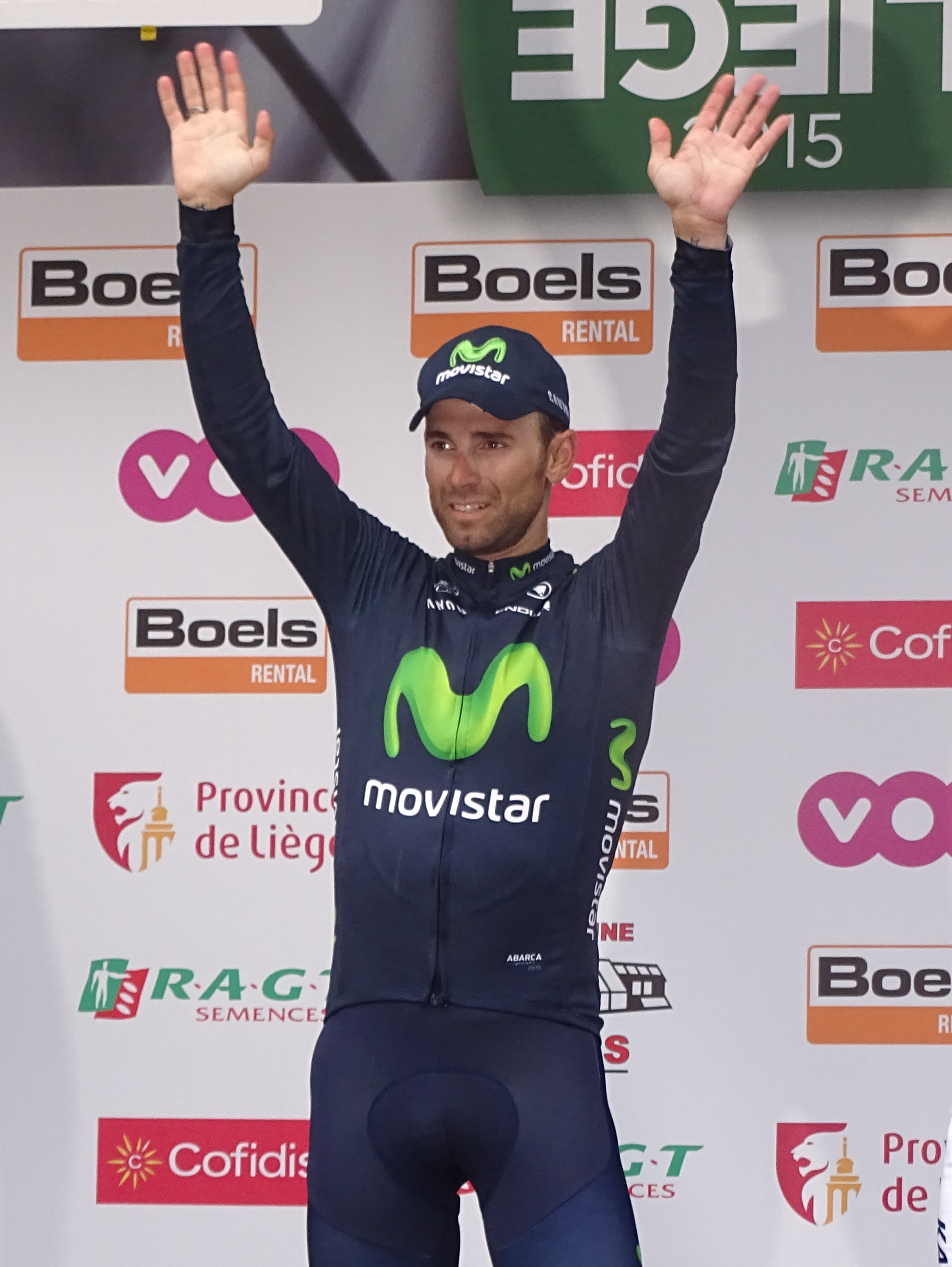
Alejandro Valverde (Movistar Team), photographed celebrating his victory in the 2015 Liège–Bastogne–Liège, was the favourite for victory in Il Lombardia.

The defending champion in the race was Dan Martin (Cannondale–Garmin), who won the 2014 edition with a late attack. He had crashed during the Vuelta a España, however, and had been forced to retire from the race due to injury. After recovering from the injury, he had raced just once since the crash: he finished in 14th place in Milano–Torino. His form before the race was therefore unclear, especially as Il Lombardia is both longer and more difficult than Milano–Torino. Il Lombardia was the final race of Martin's season and also his final race for the Cannondale-Garmin team.

With Martin's form uncertain, the favourite for the race was Alejandro Valverde. As well as performing strongly in the early-season hilly classics in the 2015 season, he had been close to success in Il Lombardia in the past: he finished second in both 2013 and 2014. Max Sciandri, a directeur sportif for the BMC Racing Team, said that the increased difficulty of the 2015 edition suited Valverde: "now it suits the climbers and good descenders rather the Classics riders ... [Valverde] can climb, can descend and is even fast in a sprint finish." Cycling Weekly suggested that Valverde's ability to recover from the Vuelta in time for Il Lombardia would work in his favour. Joaquim Rodríguez (Team Katusha) would also have been a strong favourite for the race: he won the 2012 and 2013 editions and had come second in the Vuelta. However, he injured his knee when he hit a sign post while training and was forced to withdraw from the race.

Vincenzo Nibali was also cited as a potential winner of the race, following a difficult season. He had struggled during the Tour de France and was subsequently thrown out of the Vuelta for holding on to a team car. He had therefore made Il Lombardia a significant target. Nibali had performed strongly in the other late-season Italian classics, while his team had shown its strength in supporting Diego Rosa to victory in Milano–Torino. Fabio Aru, who had won the Vuelta, was not present: he was riding the Tour of Almaty instead.

With Rodríguez absent, two other former champions started the race: these were Philippe Gilbert (BMC), the winner in 2009 and 2010, and Damiano Cunego (Nippo–Vini Fantini), who won in 2007 and 2008. Gilbert in particular was considered a potential winner of the race. Other favourites for the race victory included Thibaut Pinot (FDJ), Rui Costa and Diego Ulissi (Lampre-Merida), Simon Gerrans (Orica–GreenEDGE), Rafał Majka (Tinkoff–Saxo), Robert Gesink (LottoNL–Jumbo), Warren Barguil (Team Giant–Alpecin), Domenico Pozzovivo and Romain Bardet (AG2R La Mondiale), Michał Kwiatkowski (Etixx–Quick-Step) and Tim Wellens (Lotto–Soudal).

== Race report ==
The race began in Bergamo with grey skies and rain falling. The race began with a succession of attacks; eventually an eleven-rider group escaped to form the day's principal breakaway. These were Stefan Schumacher (CCC–Sprandi–Polkowice), Enrico Barbin (Bardiani–CSF), Jan Polanc (Lampre-Merida), Matteo Busato (Southeast Pro Cycling), Dennis van Winden (LottoNL-Jumbo), Simon Geschke (Giant-Alpecin), Pierpaolo De Negri (Nippo-Vini Fantini), Marco Canola (UnitedHealthcare), Cesare Benedetti (Bora-Argon 18), Jérôme Coppel (IAM Cycling) and Oscar Gatto (Androni Giocattoli–Sidermec). The break had a lead that extended to over eight minutes after the Colle Brianza, while the peloton was controlled principally by Astana, with some assistance from Movistar and Team Sky. By the foot of the Madonna del Ghisallo, the lead had been cut to just two and a half minutes.

The Madonna del Ghisallo was the location for several attacks. In the breakaway, Benedetti, Canola, van Winden and Barbin broke away from the other riders. Michał Kwiatkowski was the first to attack from the peloton: he was then joined by Matteo Trentin, Carlos Verona, Łukasz Wiśniowski (all Etixx-Quick Step), Tom-Jelte Slagter (Cannondale-Garmin), Jon Izagirre (Movistar), Robert Gesink, Timo Roosen (Lotto NL-Jumbo), Giacomo Nizzolo (Trek Factory Racing) and Tim Wellens. After this climb came the Muro di Sormano. Benedetti and Canola led at the beginning of the climb, but they were soon passed by Kwiatkowski and Wellens. Wellens had to struggle to keep up with Kwiatkowski. Meanwhile, Astana rode hard in the main peloton, reducing it to around 20 riders. Philippe Gilbert and Dan Martin were among the riders unable to stay with the group and, despite Gilbert's efforts, they were unable to regain contact.

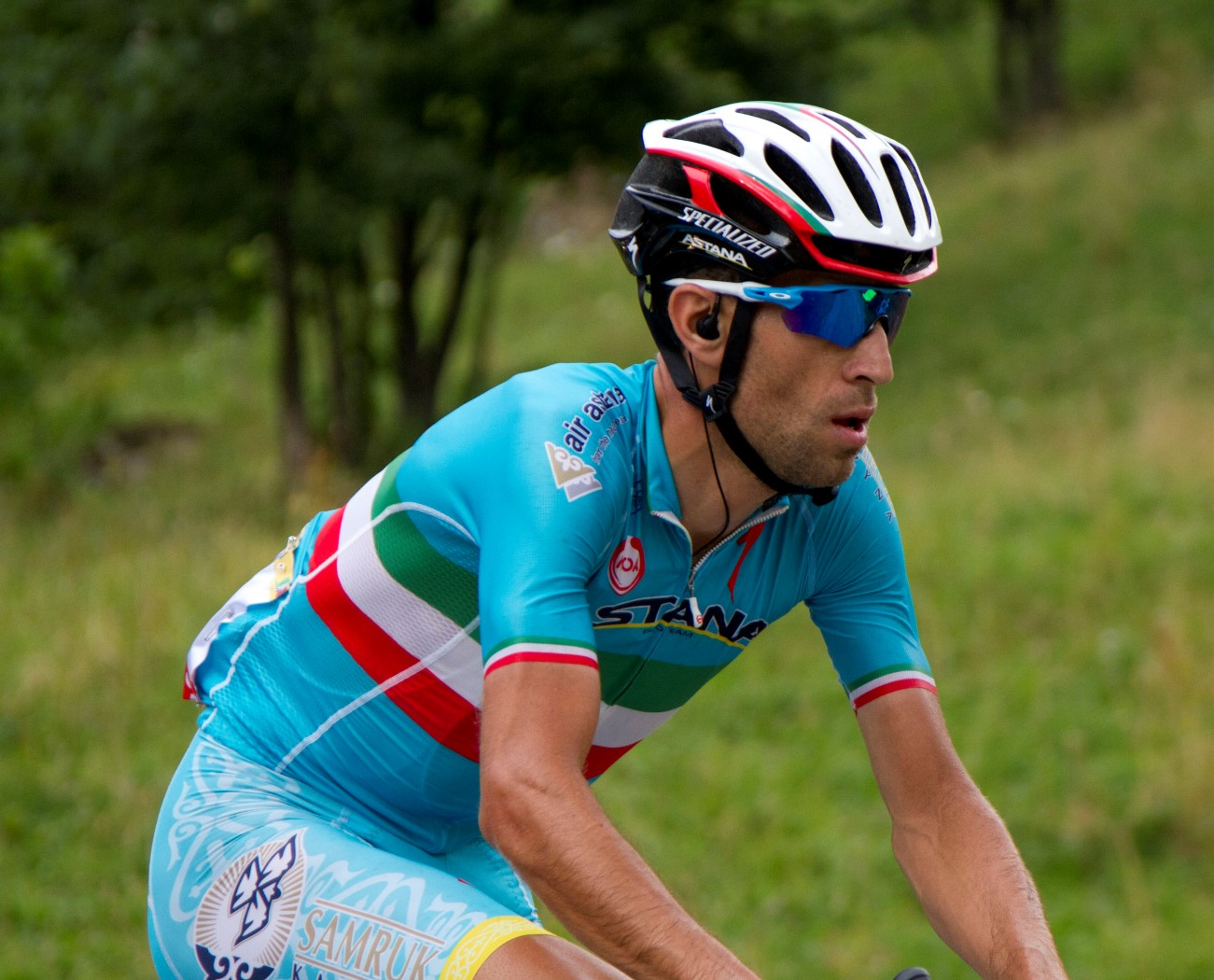
Vincenzo Nibali (Astana), photographed during the 2015 Tour de France, attacked on the penultimate descent and won his first Monument.

On the descent from the Sormano, Kwiatkowski and Wellens led, while Diego Rosa led the peloton on behalf of Nibali. The leading pair's advantage was reduced on the descent and then further on the flat section leading towards Como. As the climb of the Civiglio started with approximately 20 kilometres (12 mi) remaining, Kwiatkowski attacked alone; he was caught, however, by the peloton just 0.5 kilometres (0 mi) later. Astana continued to lead the peloton; their pace reduced the front group to just seven riders. Rosa was among the riders to be dropped, but he worked with Sergio Henao (Sky) to return to the group. He was then one of several riders to attack towards the top of the Civiglio, along with Mikel Nieve (Sky), Nibali and Pinot. None of the attacks were successful, as Daniel Moreno (Katusha) brought the other riders back to the leaders, and the group came to the top of the climb together.

Nibali attacked again just after the summit and rode alone down the descent. Despite almost colliding with a race motorbike at one point, he used his strong descending skills to gain an advantage over the rest of the group. He used the whole width of the road and coming very close to the crash barriers at various moments. Rosa, meanwhile, came to the head of the group in an attempt to slow the chase down. Nibali's lead at the foot of the descent was around 40 seconds.

As the final climb began with 7.5 kilometres (4.7 mi) remaining, Nibali was still over 40 seconds ahead of the group behind. Pinot attacked but was soon caught and passed by Moreno, who set off alone in pursuit of Nibali. Moreno made up some time during the ascent, but was unable to catch him. On the descent towards the finish line in Como, Nibali's superior skill at descending allowed him to stay ahead of Moreno and he reached the finish line alone to take the victory. Moreno finished 21 seconds later, with Pinot a further 11 seconds behind. Valverde won the sprint for fourth ahead of Rosa and Nieve.

== Result ==
Result (1-10)
Rank	Rider	Team	Time
1	Vincenzo Nibali (ITA)	Astana	6hr 16' 28"
2	Daniel Moreno (ESP)	Team Katusha	+ 21"
3	Thibaut Pinot (FRA)	FDJ	+ 32"
4	Alejandro Valverde (ESP)	Movistar Team	+ 46"
5	Diego Rosa (ITA)	Astana	+ 46"
6	Mikel Nieve (ESP)	Team Sky	+ 46"
7	Tony Gallopin (FRA)	Lotto–Soudal	+ 56"
8	Esteban Chaves (COL)	Orica–GreenEDGE	+ 56"
9	Sergio Henao (COL)	Team Sky	+ 56"
10	Gianluca Brambilla (ITA)	Etixx–Quick-Step	+ 1' 10"
Source: ProCyclingStats

== Post-race analysis ==
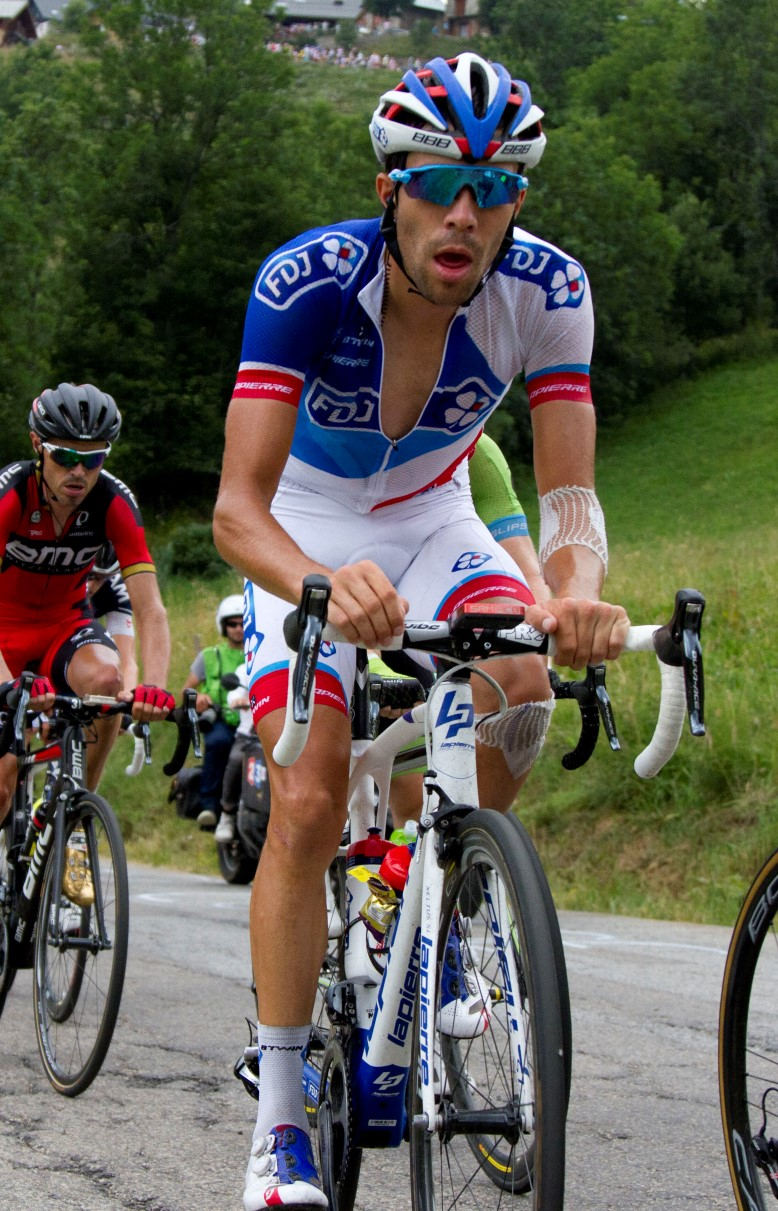
Thibaut Pinot (FDJ), photographed during the 2015 Tour de France, finished third, securing his first top ten placing in a monument.

=== Reactions ===
Nibali said after the race that his victory in Il Lombardia made his expulsion from the Vuelta a "good thing" as it helped him find some anger. He went on to say that his success had got his season back on track, particularly as he was the first Italian to win one of the Monuments in a long time. The last Italian to win any of the cycling Monuments was Damiano Cunego in the 2008 Giro di Lombardia. Nibali described the victory as being as good as a win in Liège–Bastogne–Liège; he said also that, despite the risks he took on the descent from the Civiglio, Peter Sagan was "crazier" than him when descending.

Pinot described himself as "proud" at the end of the race, as Il Lombardia had been a major goal for him. He described Nibali as "the strongest, the smartest and the sneakiest" rider in the race. It was the first time Pinot had finished in the top ten of a Monument. Dan Martin, who had been unable to follow the leading riders on the Muro di Sormano, finished the race in order to repay his team's faith in him following his injury earlier in the season. He finished 52nd, nearly ten minutes behind Nibali, and said that he had not been strong enough to follow the attacks on the climb.

=== UCI World Tour rankings ===
Despite the points won by Moreno's second-place finish, Katusha were not able to win enough points to win the UCI World Tour rankings. The 60 points that Valverde won were enough to secure the overall victory in the team's competition, as well as increasing his own margin of victory in the individual classification. Pinot's third-place finish earned him 70 points and moved him up to tenth place in the World Tour rankings, while the success of the Italian riders moved Italy ahead of both Colombia and Great Britain to finish second behind Spain in the national rankings.
