= Le Cornelle =

Zoo in Lombardy, Italy

Coordinates: 45.7159°N 9.5983°E

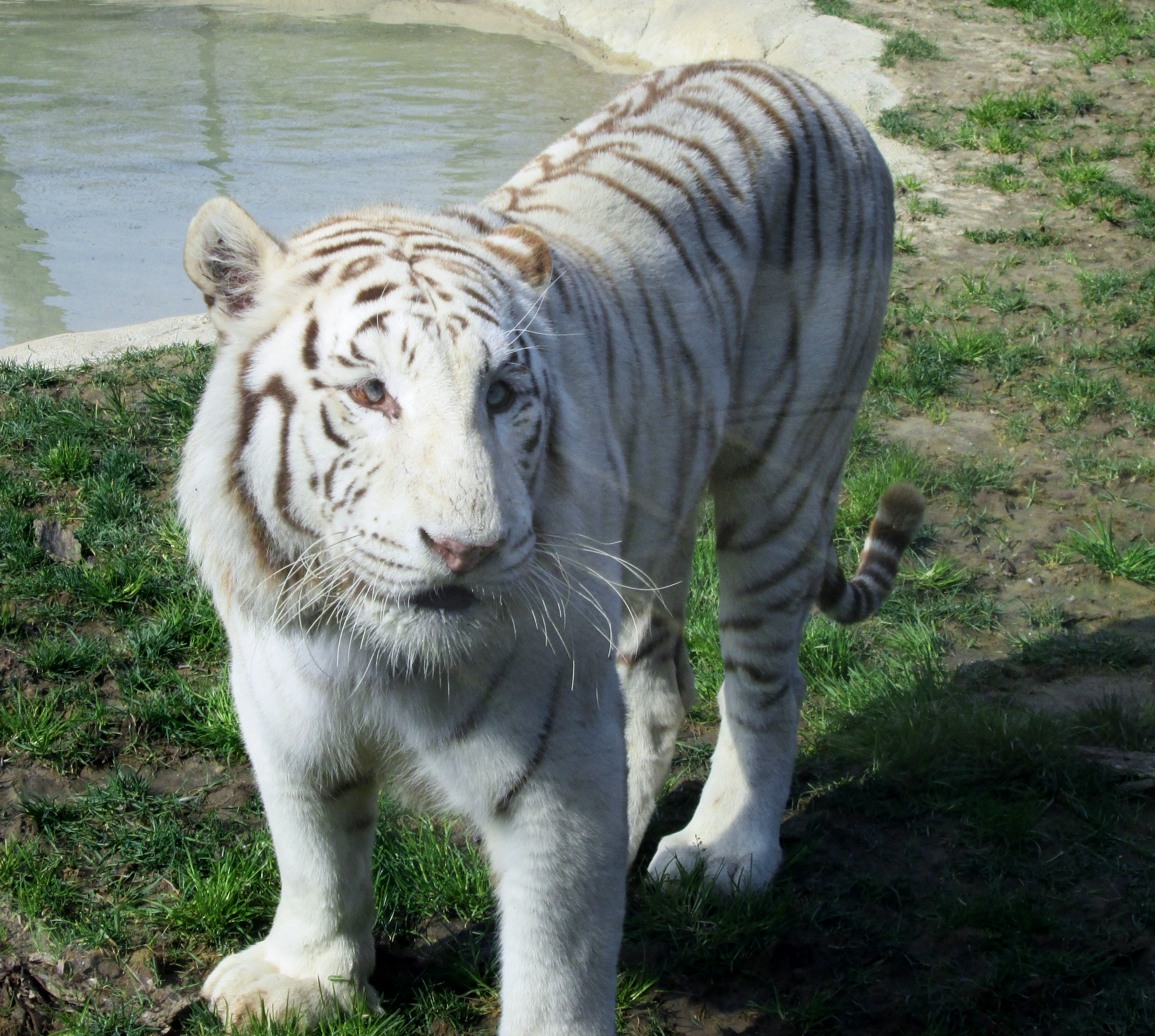
- White tiger
- Interactive map of Le Cornelle
- Type: Zoo, Amusement park
- Location: Valbrembo, Italy
- Area: 100.000 m2
- Created: 1981
- Status: Opened all year

Le Cornelle is a zoo and amusement park in Valbrembo, in the Lombardy province, northern Italy, created by Angelo Ferruccio Benedetti in 1981; extending over an area of 100,000 square metres.

== Description ==
The purpose of the park is to preserve wildlife in captivity, according to the project EEP (European Endangered Species Programme), to which the park has adopted from the foundation. The animals live in enclosures that reconstruct the environment of origin, and reproduce themselves: the puppies are reintroduced in the original places of origin, according to the guidelines of the project. The park is the home of 1,000 animals belonging to 120 different species, including mammals, birds and reptiles. Le Cornelles has besides the largest aviary in Italy, called "Selva Tropicale", it's an area of 7,000 m2, closed by a grid placed on high poles to prevent the flight of birds, which live in a state of semi-freedom.

== Mammals ==
- Red-necked wallaby
- Red kangaroo
- Flying fox
- Mara
- Meerkat
- Puma
- South African cheetah
- Leopard
- Snow leopard
- Bengal tiger
- Siberian tiger
- Golden tiger
- Lion
- Striped hyena
- Raccoon
- Brown bear
- Harbour seal
- Black-and-white ruffed lemur
- Ring-tailed lemur
- Cotton-top tamarin
- Squirrel monkey
- Barbary macaque
- Lar gibbon
- Siamang
- Asian elephant
- Southern white rhinoceros
- Lowland tapir
- Pony
- Mule
- Grant's zebra
- Hippopotamus
- Alpaca
- Llama
- Dromedary camel
- Bactrian camel
- South African giraffe
- Reeve's muntjac
- Axis deer
- Reindeer
- Watusi cattle
- Cameroon (sheep)
- Domestic goat
- Common eland
- Bongo
- Sitatunga
- Scimitar-horned oryx
- Southern lechwe
- Nile lechwe
- Blackbuck
- Red panda

== Birds ==
- Victoria crowned-pigeon
- Common raven
- Indian peafowl
- Baikal teal
- Mallard
- Mandarin duck
- Wood duck
- Ruddy shelduck
- Swan goose
- Egyptian goose
- White-faced whistling-duck
- Mute swan
- Black-necked swan
- Black swan
- Laughing kookaburra
- Great white pelican
- African sacred ibis
- Scarlet ibis
- White stork
- Black stork
- Saddlebill
- Marabou stork
- Lesser flamingo
- Greater flamingo
- American flamingo
- Chilean flamingo
- Sarus crane
- Red-crowned crane
- White-naped crane
- Demoiselle crane
- Grey crowned-crane
- Galah
- Sulphur-crested cockatoo
- Salmon-crested cockatoo
- Lovebird
- Monk parakeet
- Eclectus parrot
- Grey parrot
- Military macaw
- Scarlet macaw
- Blue and yellow macaw
- Hyacinth macaw
- Steppe eagle
- White-tailed sea eagle
- Turkey vulture
- Himalayan griffon
- Eurasian eagle-owl
- Spotted eagle-owl
- Snowy owl
- Greater rhea
- Emu
- Common ostrich
- Humboldt penguin

== Reptiles ==
- Four-lined snake
- Corn snake
- False coral snake
- Royal python
- Boa constrictor
- Madagascar day gecko
- Central bearded dragon
- Red tegu
- American alligator
- Nile crocodile
- African spurred tortoise
- Aldabra giant tortoise

== Gallery ==
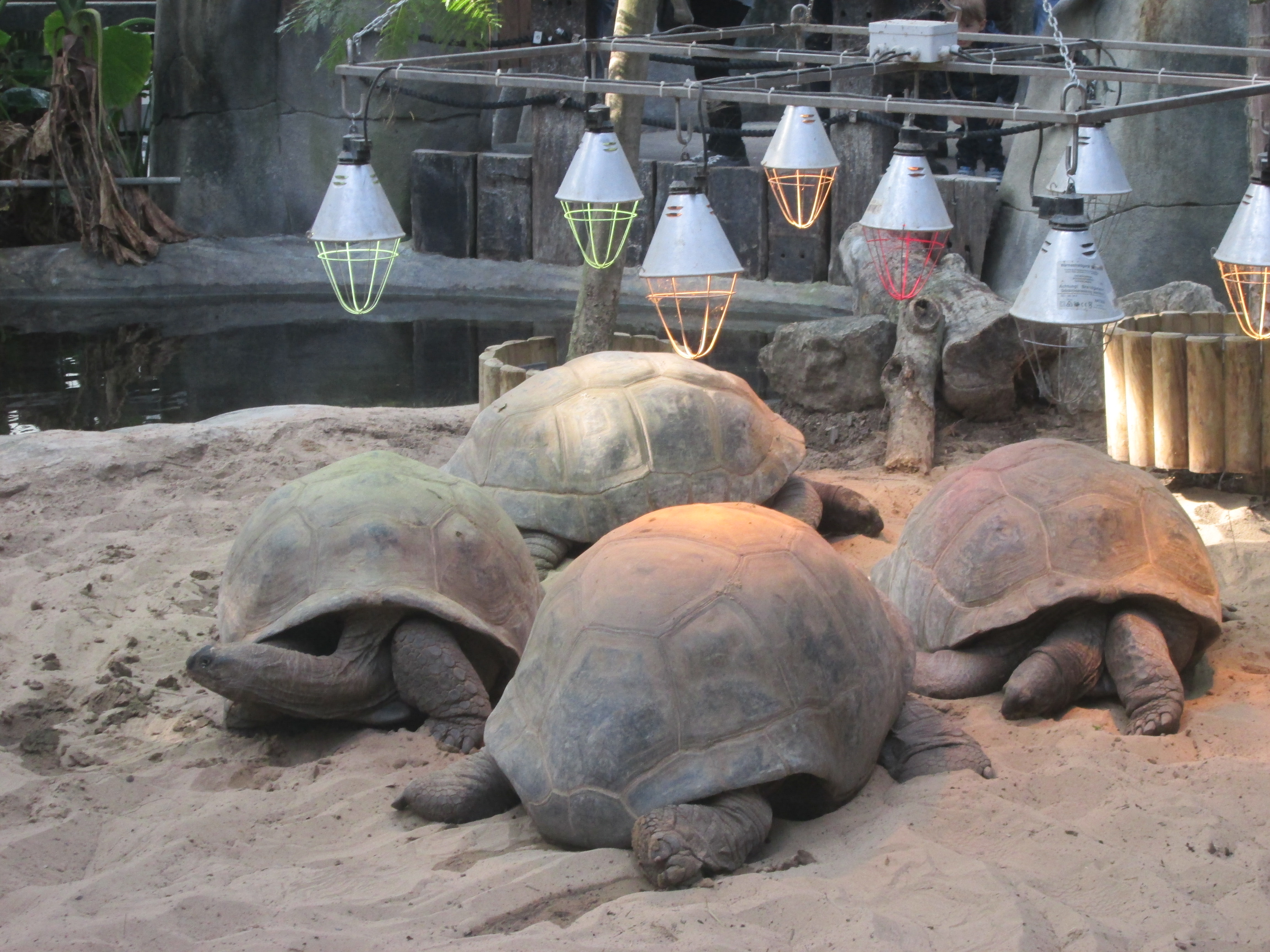
Aldabra giant tortoises

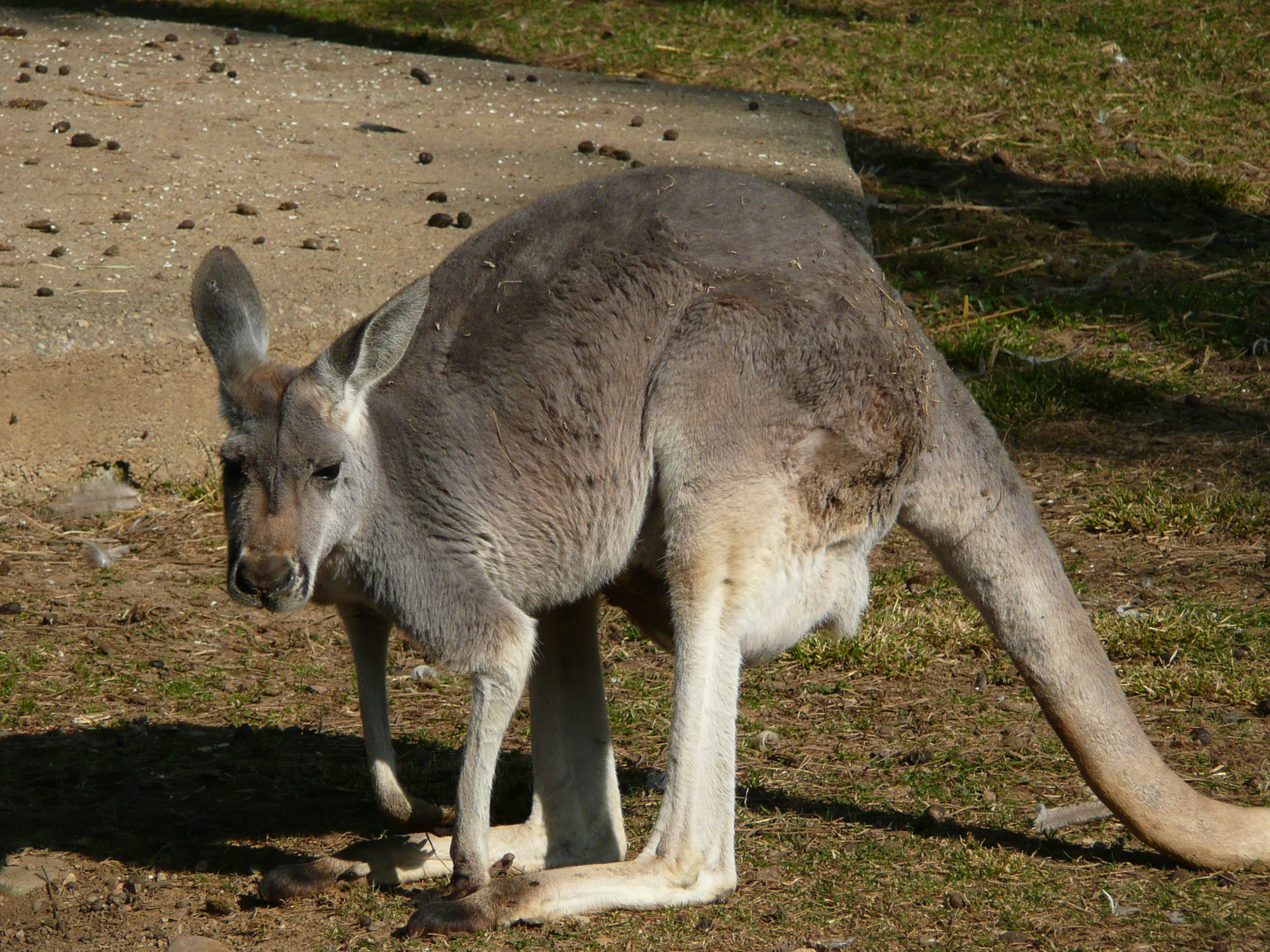
Red kangaroo

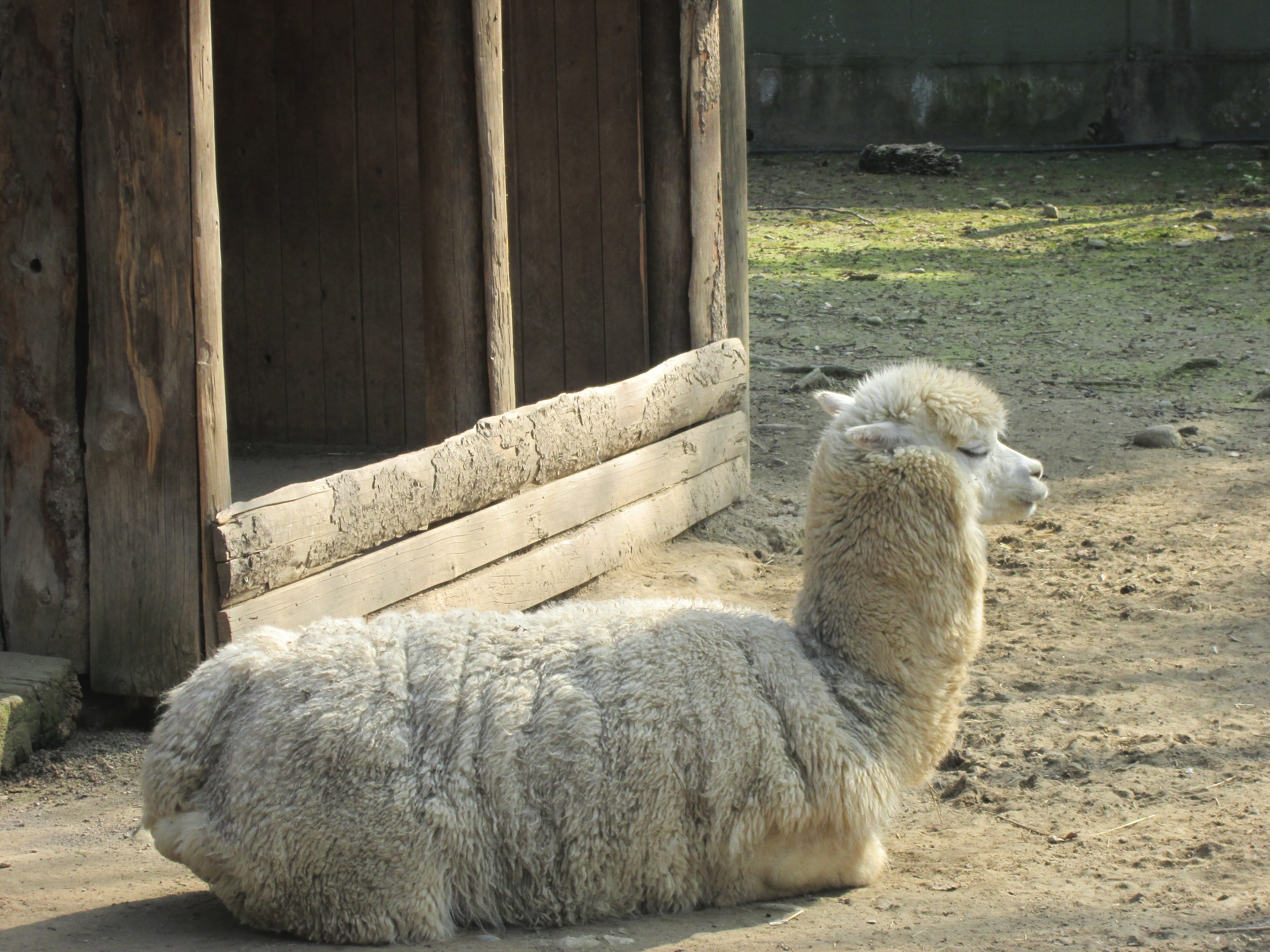
Alpaca

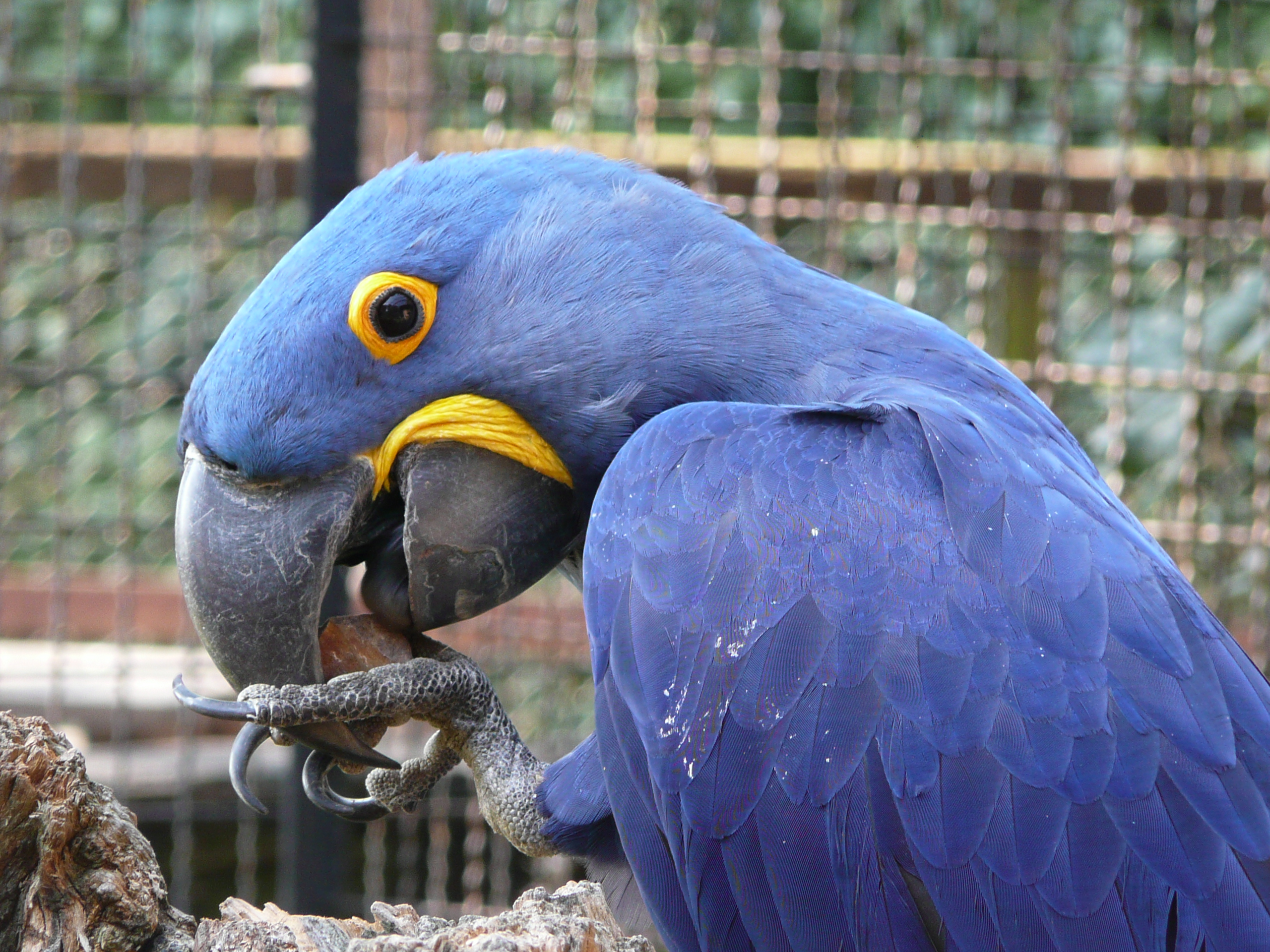
Hyacinth macaw

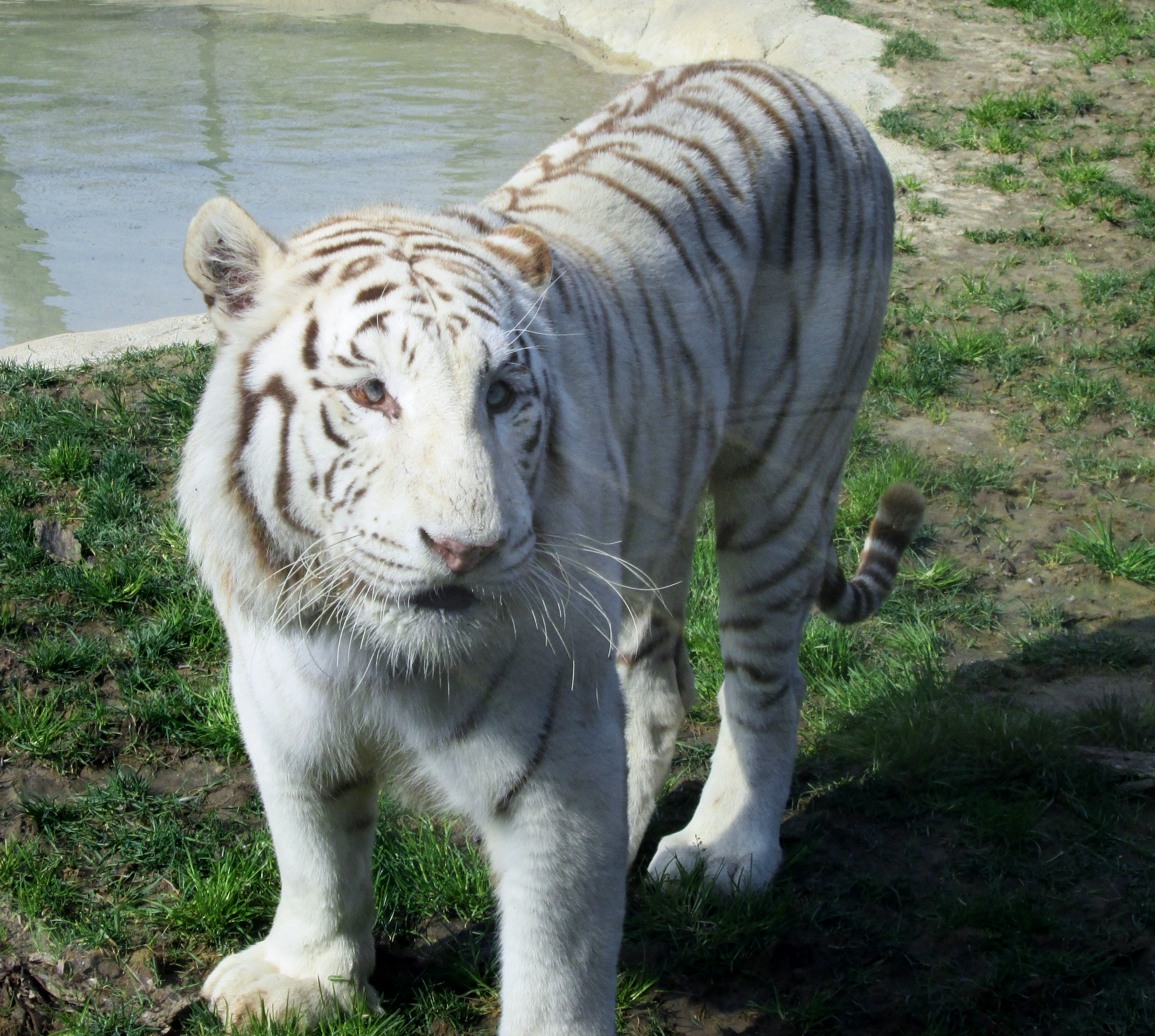
White tiger

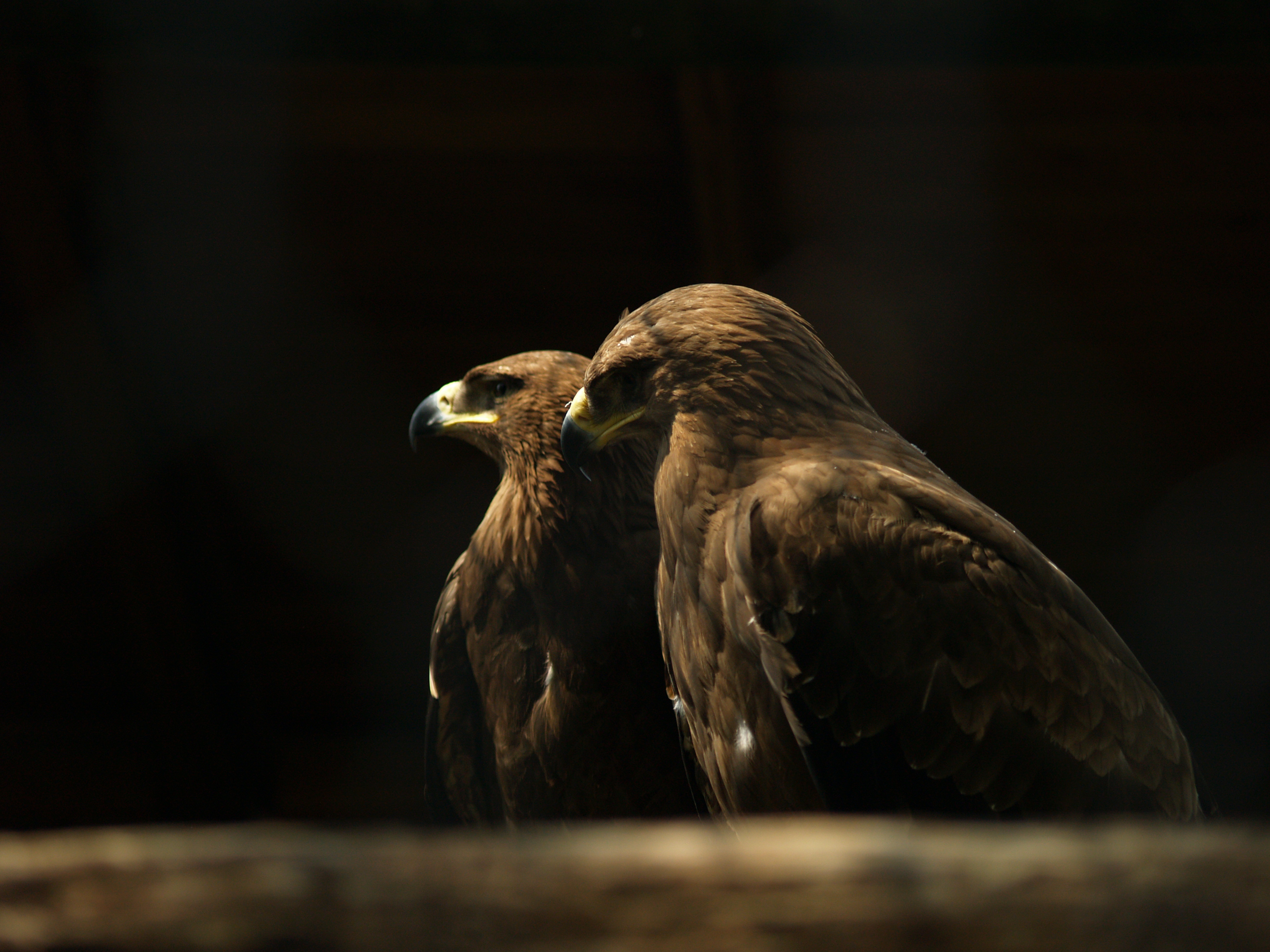
Steppe eagle

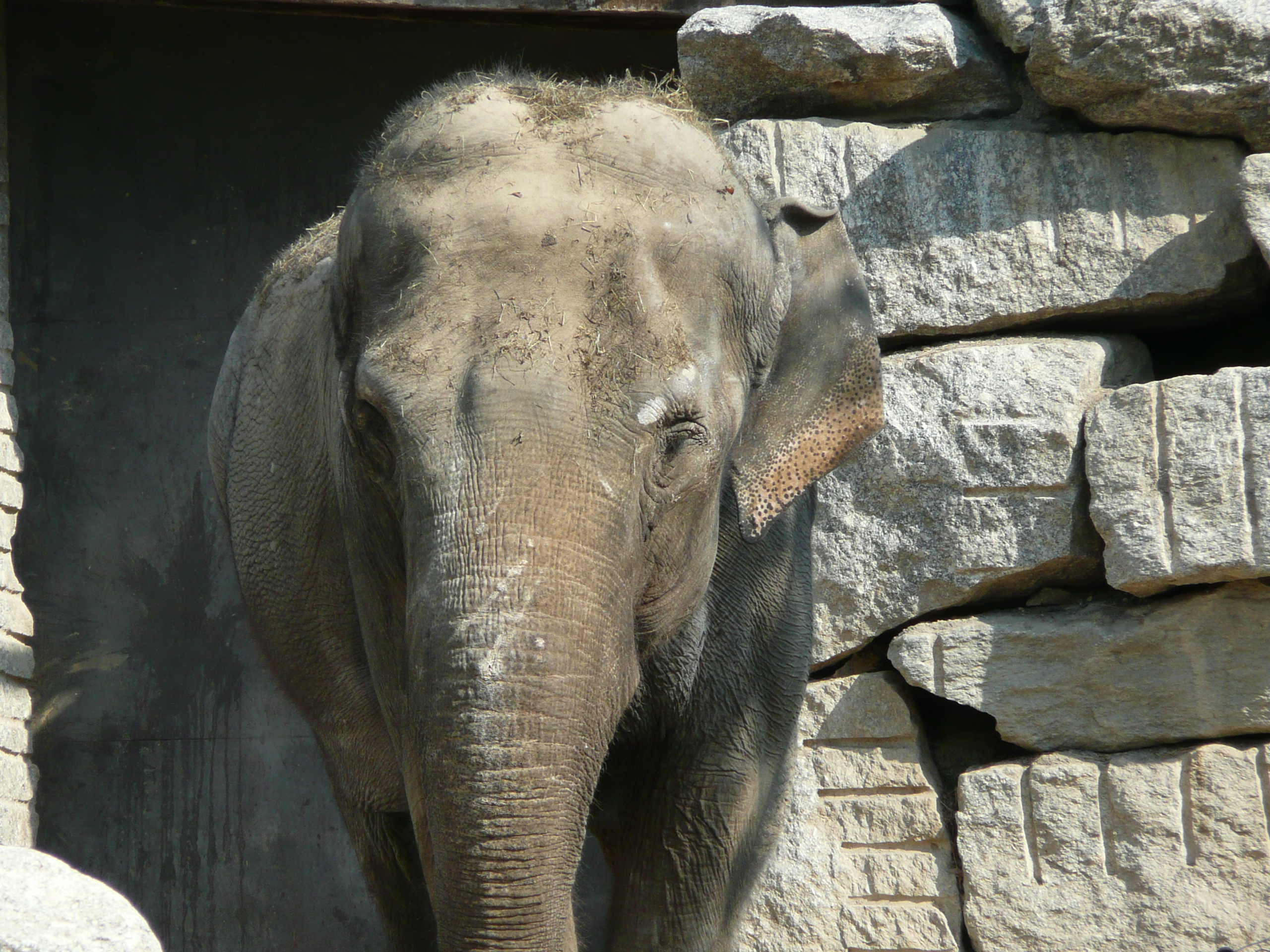
Asian elephant

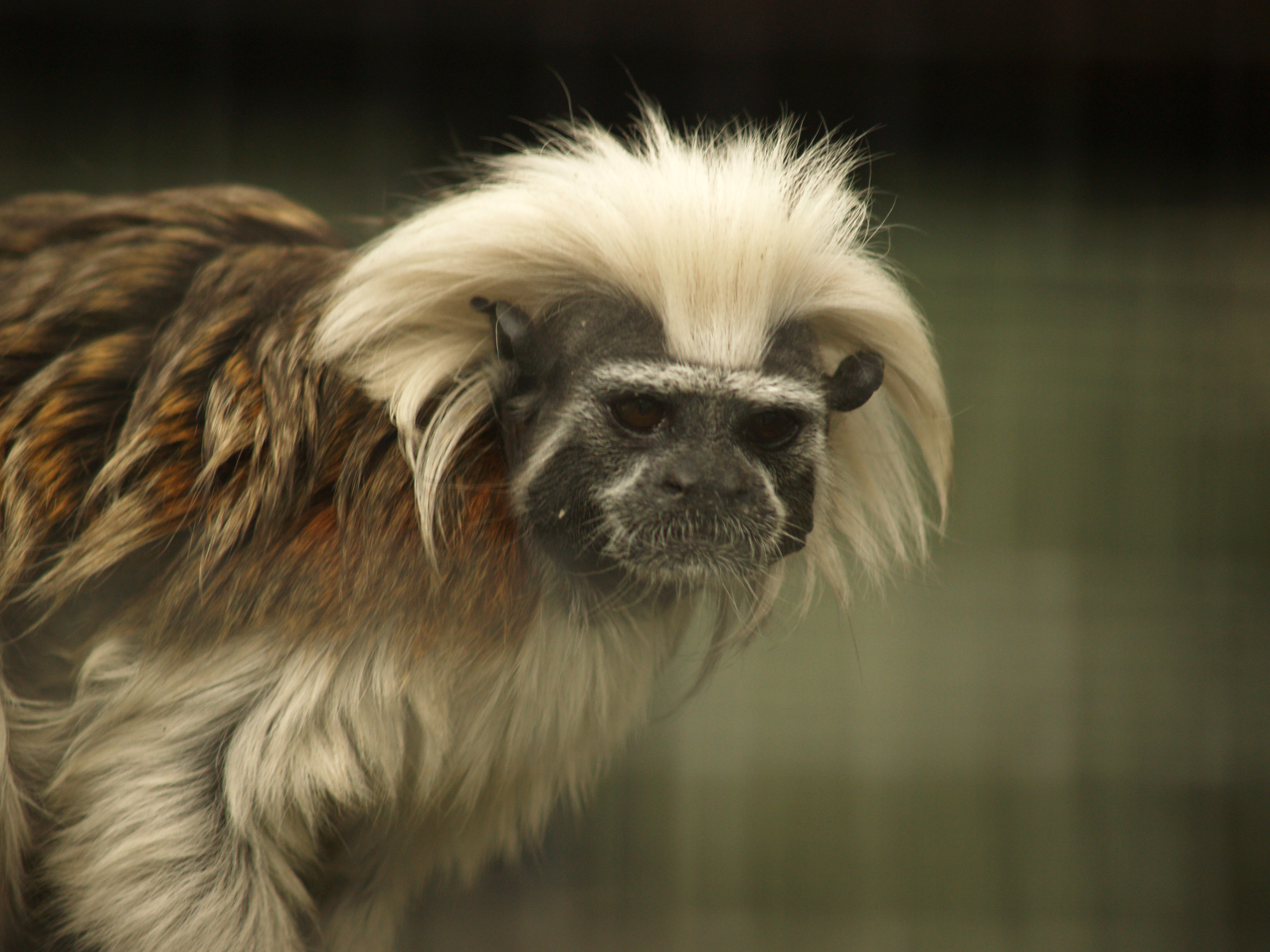
Cotton-top tamarin

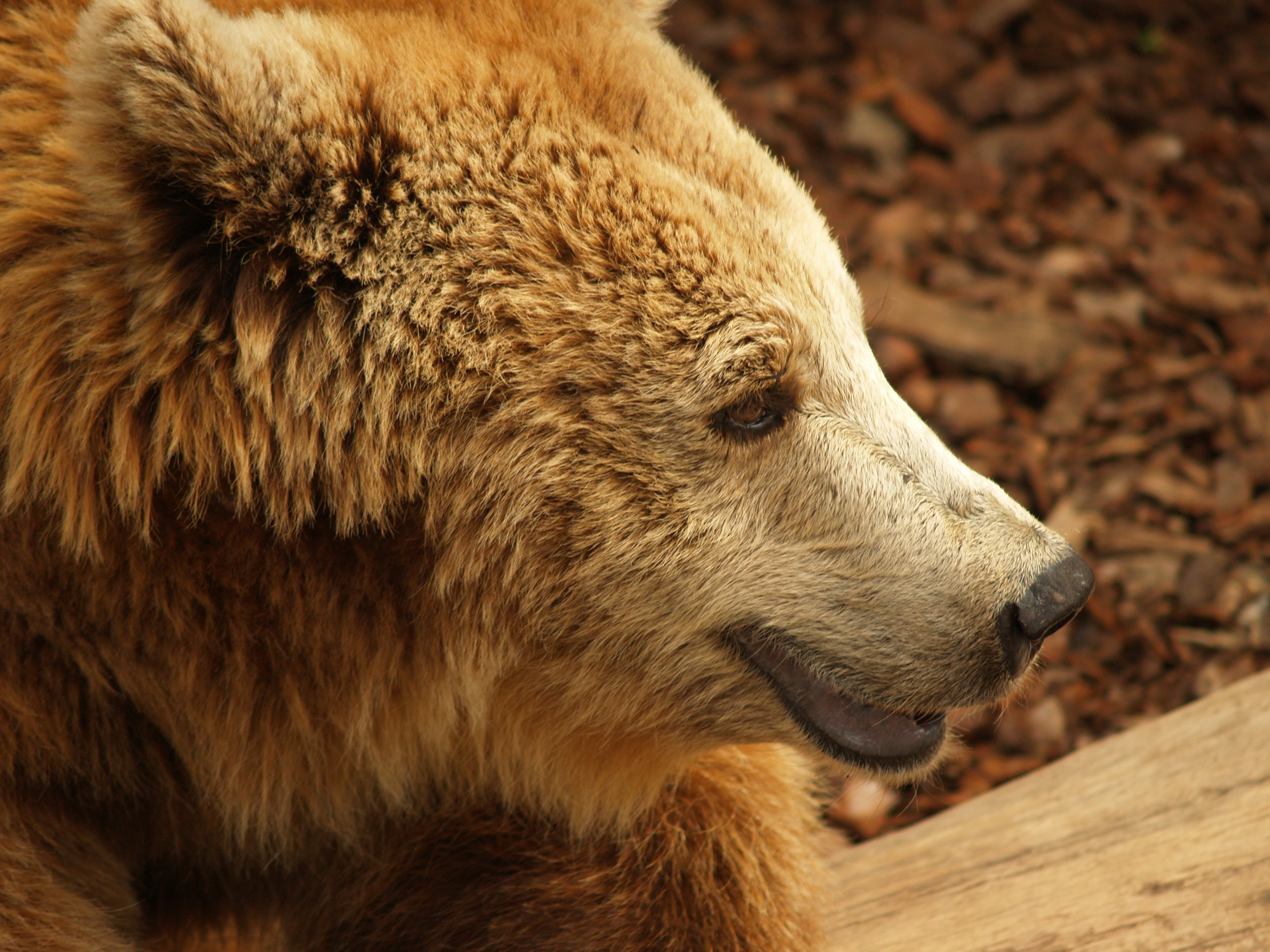
Brown bear

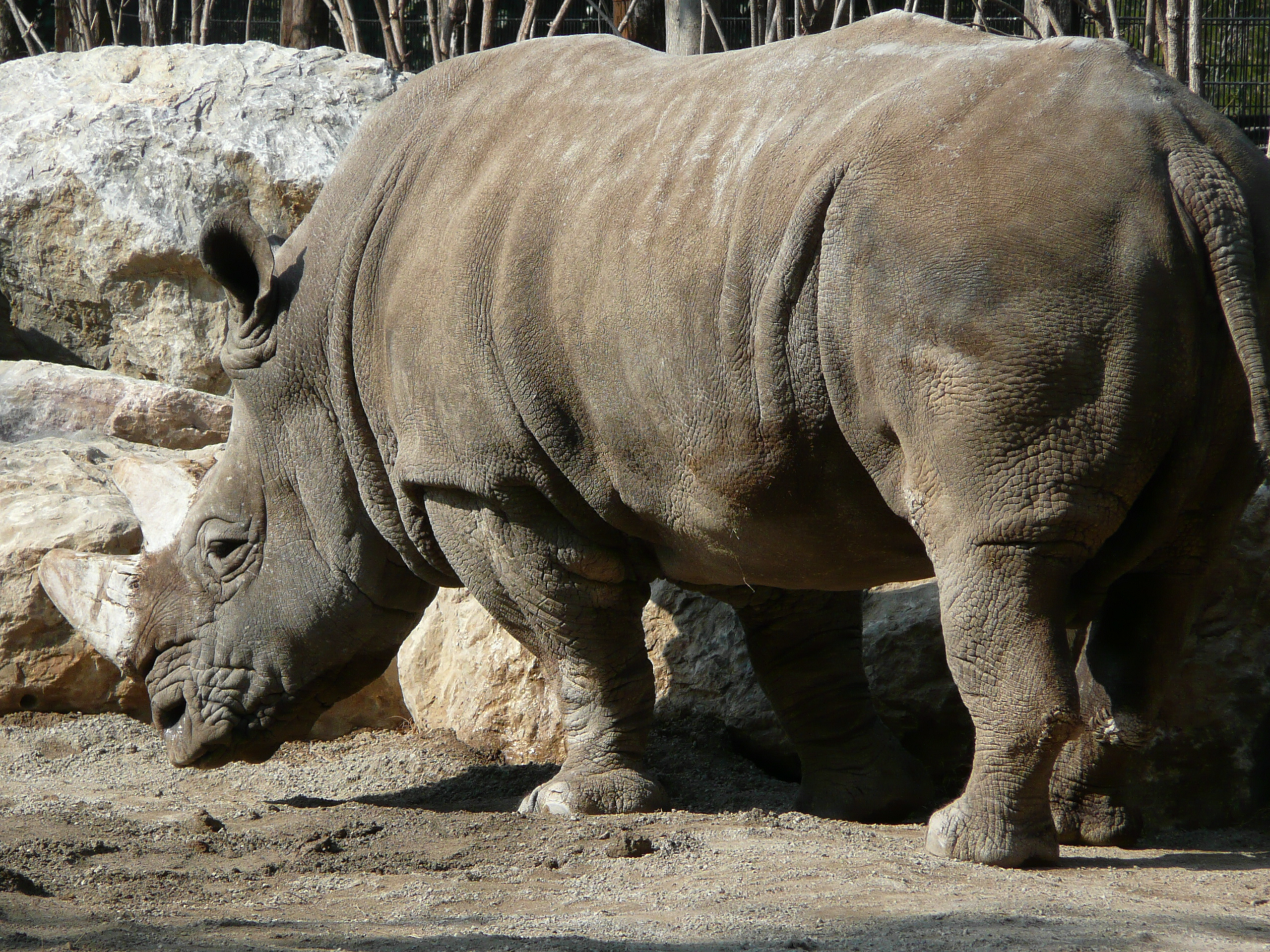
White rhino

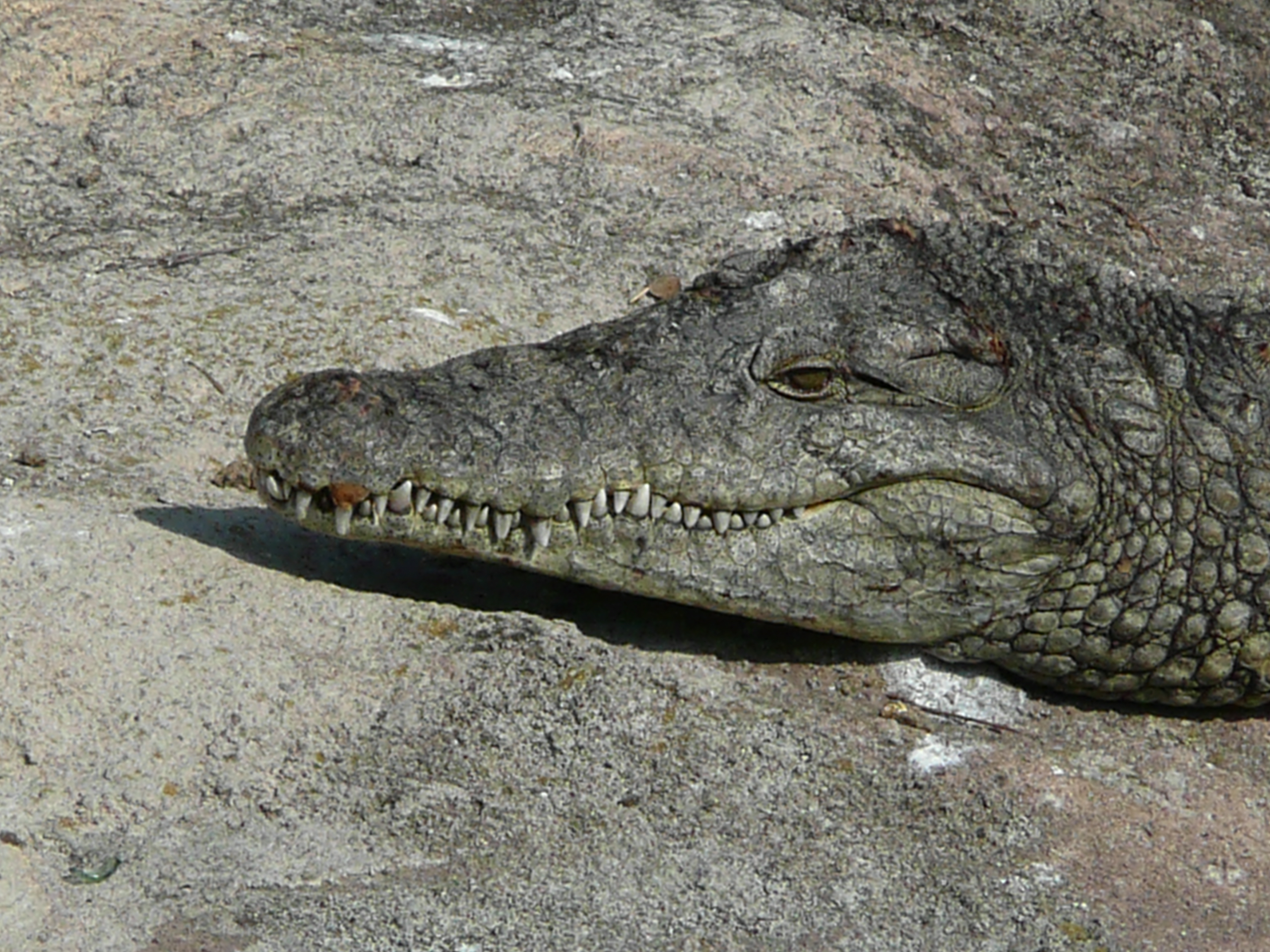
Nile crocodile

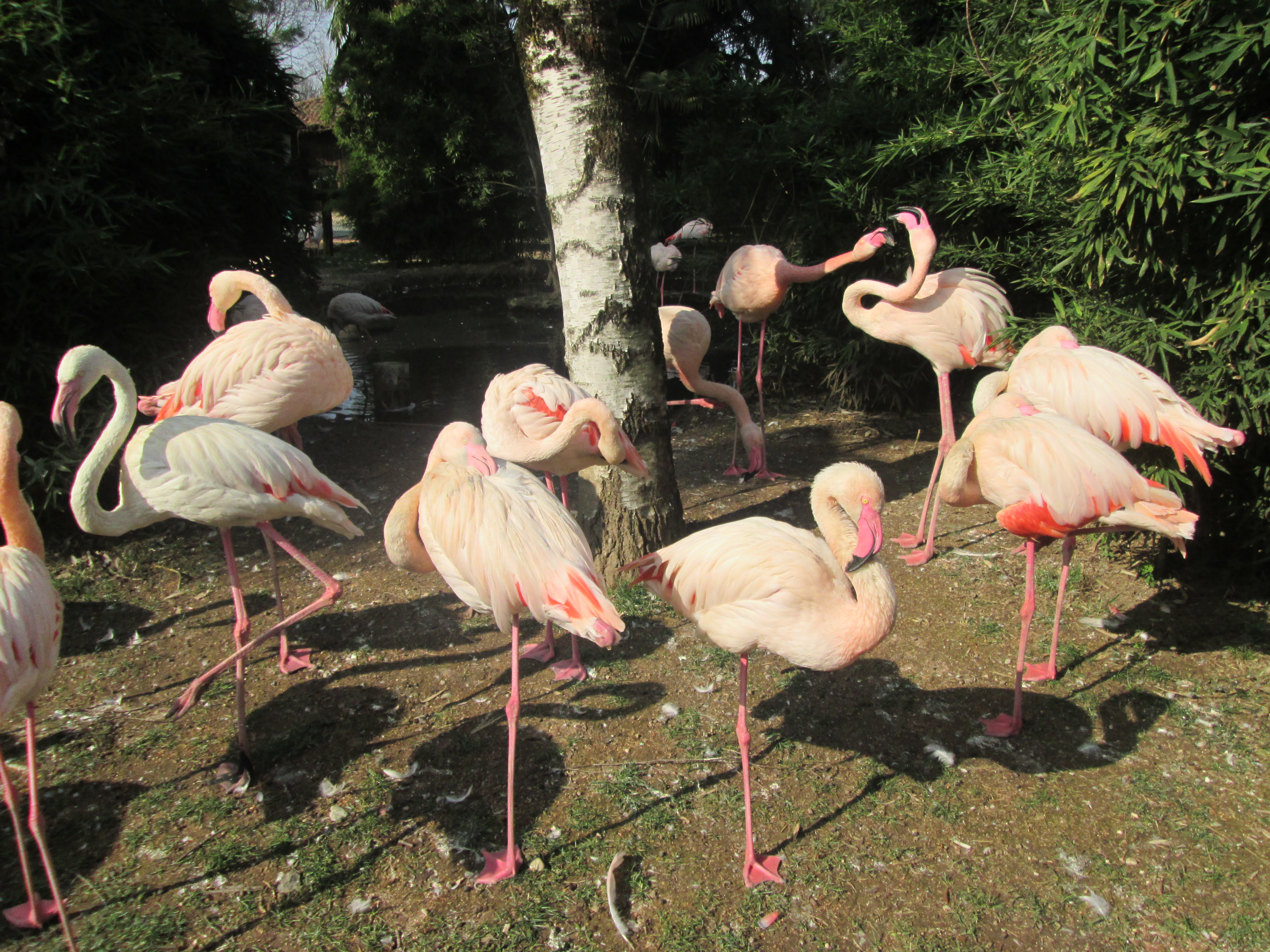
Greater flamingos

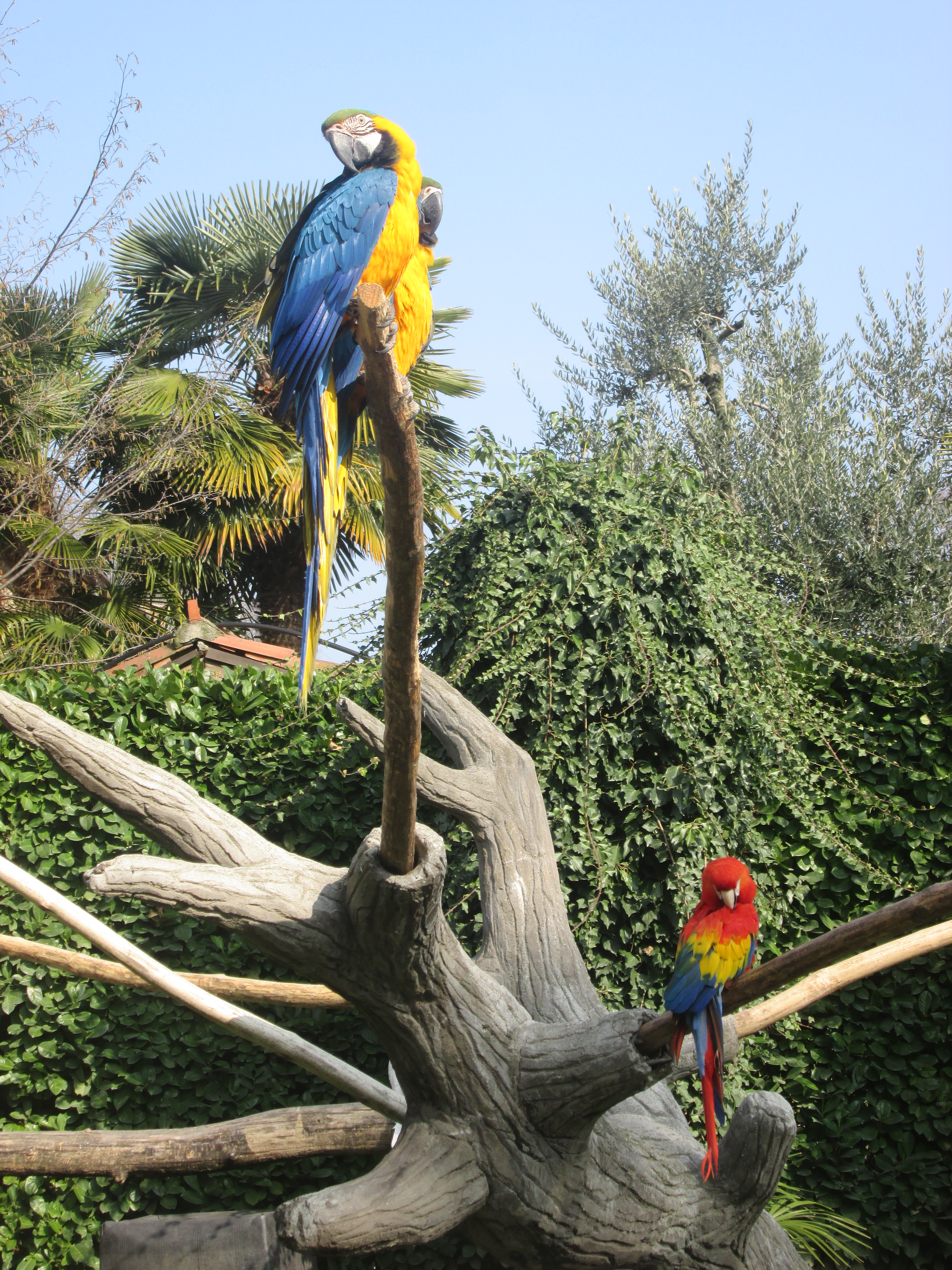
Blue-and-yellow macaw and scarlet macaw
