= Mozzo =

- Comune
- Comune di Mozzo
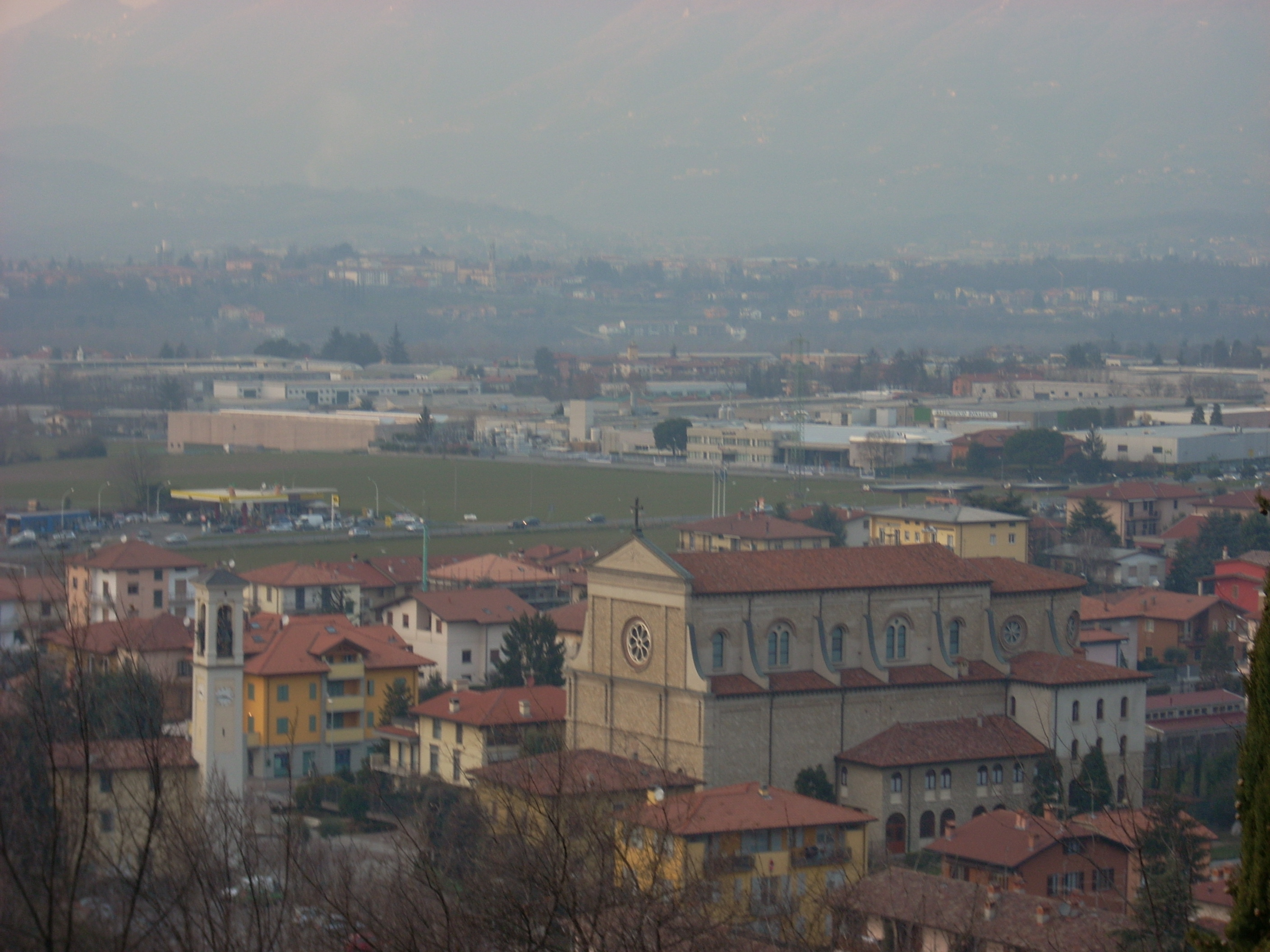
- Mozzo

- Location within Italy Location within Lombardy
- Coordinates: 45°42′N 9°36′E
- Country: Italy
- Region: Lombardy
- Province: Province of Bergamo (BG)
- Frazioni: Borghetto, Ca' del Lupo, Colombera, Crocette, Dorotina, Merena, Mozzo di Sopra, Pascoletto

Government
  - Mayor: Paolo Peliccioli

Area
  - Total: 3.6 km^{2} (1.4 sq mi)
- Elevation: 252 m (827 ft)

Population (31 May 2021)
  - Total: 7,323
  - Density: 2,000/km^{2} (5,300/sq mi)
- Demonym: Mozzesi
- Time zone: UTC+1 (CET)
  - Summer (DST): UTC+2 (CEST)
- Postal code: 24030
- Dialing code: 035
- Website: Official website

Mozzo (Bergamasque: Móss) is a comune (municipality) in the Province of Bergamo in the Italian region of Lombardy, located about 45 kilometres (28 mi) northeast of Milan and about 5 kilometres (3 mi) west of Bergamo.

The municipality of Mozzo contains the frazioni (subdivisions, mainly villages and hamlets) Borghetto, Ca' del Lupo, Colombera, Crocette, Dorotina, Merena, Mozzo di Sopra, and Pascoletto.

Mozzo borders the following municipalities: Bergamo, Curno, Ponte San Pietro, Valbrembo. Part of Mozzo's territory is part of Parco dei Colli di Bergamo.

== Economy ==
Mozzo was the birthplace for the multinational chemical company Sigma. In 1958, it produced surfactants used in the textile industry.
