= Onno =

Onno is a Dutch and East Frisian masculine given name of unclear origin. People with the name include:

- Onno Behrends (1862–1920), East Frisian tea manufacturer
- Onno Boelee (1945–2003), Dutch-born New Zealand professional wrestler, actor, and stuntman
- Onno J. Boxma (born 1952), Dutch mathematician
- Onno Elderenbosch (born ca. 1943), Dutch ambassador
- Onno Zwier van Haren (1713–1779), Dutch politician, playwright and poet
- Onno Hoes (born 1961), Dutch VVD politician
- Onno Jacobs (born 1964), Dutch businessman
- Onno Klopp (1822–1903), German historian
- Onno Meijer (1960–2008), Dutch actor
- Onno Oncken (born 1955), German geologist and recipient of the 1998 Leibniz Prize
- Onno Ruding (born 1939), Dutch banker, executive director of the IMF and Minister of Finance
- Onno van de Stolpe (born 1959), Dutch businessman
- Onno Tunç (1948–1996), Armenian-Turkish musician born Ohannes Tunçboyacıyan
- Onno Theis (born 2008), Luxembourgish Tennis Athlete
- Onno de Jong (born 1991), Software Architect

== See also ==
- Dinitrogen dioxide(ONNO)
