= Ponte San Pietro =

- Comune
- Comune di Ponte San Pietro
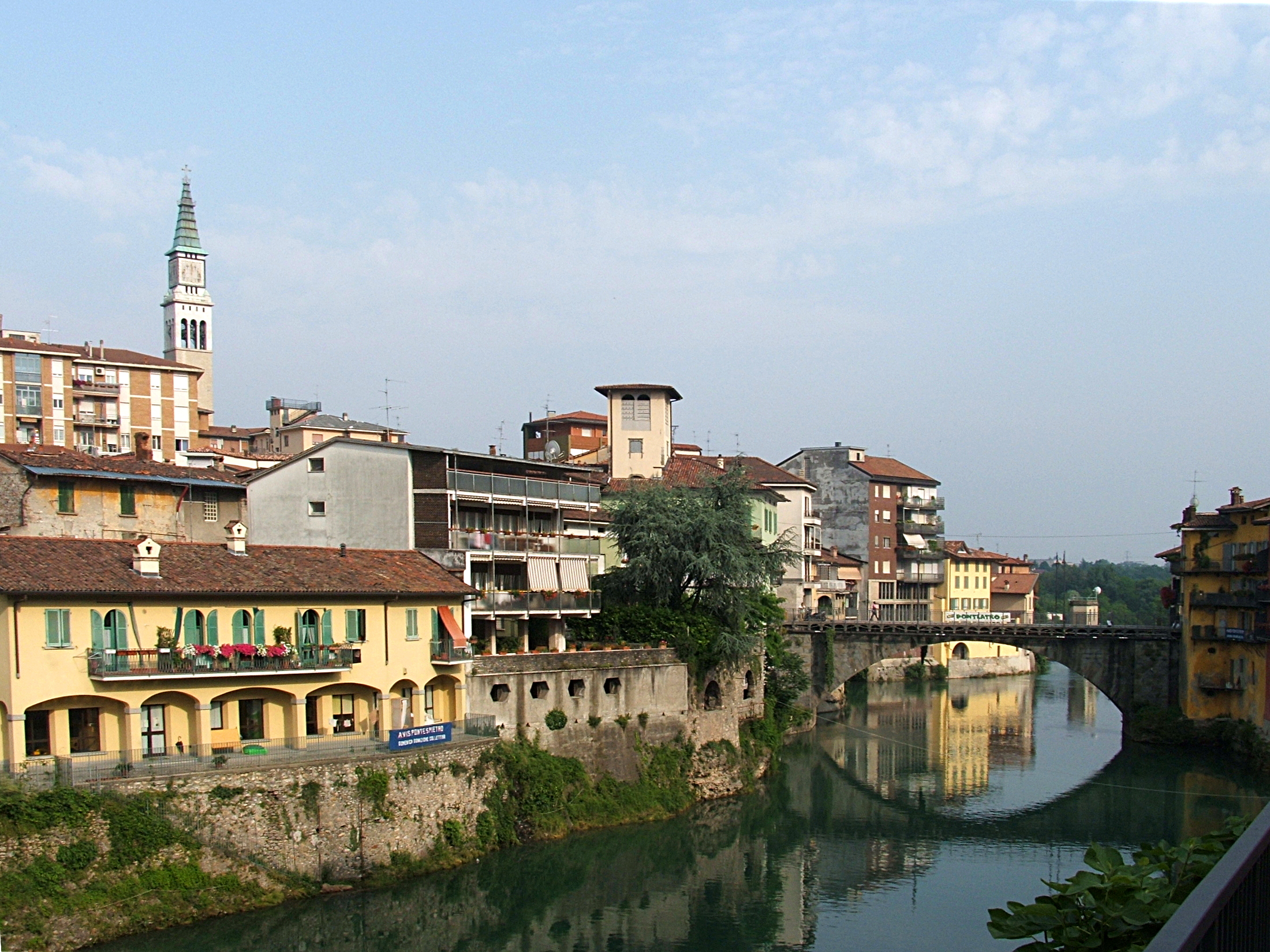
- Ponte San Pietro with the Brembo river

- Coat of arms

- Location within Italy Location within Lombardy
- Coordinates: 45°42′N 9°35′E
- Country: Italy
- Region: Lombardy
- Province: Province of Bergamo (BG)

Government
  - Mayor: Matteo Macoli (Lega)

Area
  - Total: 4.59 km^{2} (1.77 sq mi)
- Elevation: 224 m (735 ft)

Population (30 November 2019)
  - Total: 11,553
  - Density: 2,520/km^{2} (6,520/sq mi)
- Demonym: Pontesampietrini
- Time zone: UTC+1 (CET)
  - Summer (DST): UTC+2 (CEST)
- Postal code: 24036
- Dialing code: 035
- Patron saint: Sts. Peter and Paul
- Saint day: 29 June
- Website: Official website

Ponte San Pietro (Bergamasque: Pùt San Piero) is a comune in the province of Bergamo, Lombardy, northern Italy. It is about 40 kilometres (25 mi) northeast of Milan and about 7 kilometres (4 mi) west of Bergamo.

Sights include the Villa Mapelli Mozzi.

== Geography ==
Ponte San Pietro is built on the banks of the Brembo, which divides the town into two distinct areas. It is about 7 kilometers far from Bergamo, and it is considered the first town of the so-called "Isola", a geographical area that comprehend 21 municipalities, delimitated by the waters of the two main rivers, Adda and Brembo. The municipality borders on the north with Brembate di Sopra and Valbrembo, on the south with Presezzo and Bonate Sopra, on the west with Mapello and Presezzo and on the east with Curno and Mozzo.

== History ==
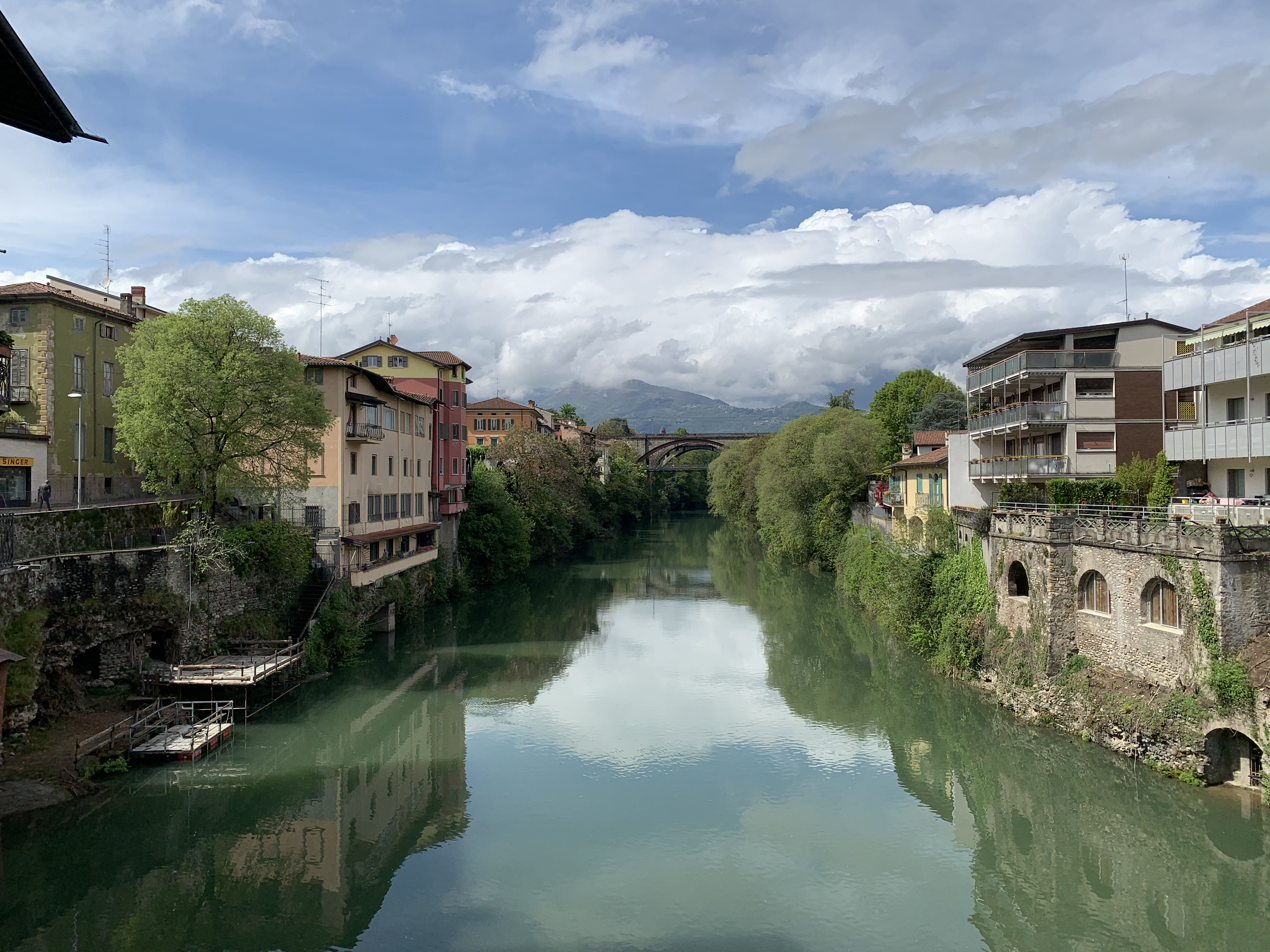
View from the bridge over the Brembo river

The name is believed to originate from the presence of a small bridge over the Brembo and the adjoining small church dedicated to Saint Peter in 881, through a notarial writing reporting “Basilica Sancti Petri sita ad pontem Brembi”. Ponte San Pietro, since its origins, remained however a passage zone in a point of the bed of the river difficult to cross by boat. Only 200 years later began the first settlements on one side of the river (in an area called S. Petri de là) to the other (S. Petri de za).

Manfredino De' Melioratis, in the last years of the 13th century, build a castle in the current historic center, a settlement then destroyed by Venetians at the beginning of the 18th century. Part of the demolished materials were reused to erect a church, dedicated to Saint Peter, in the same place of the first small country church. People will always remember it as “Old Church”. The works for its construction were approved in 1708, began in the same year and finished in 1722. The church allowed the reconstruction of some historical events of the country, having preserved some writings and burial especially in the period of the plague.

In the 18th century, in Sottoriva di Locate, was erected the neoclassical residence of Villa Mapelli Mozzi. Enlarged in its current form in 1773 by the Count Enrico Mozzi, it is very similar to the more famous Royal Villa of Monza. Inside, it is possible to admire fresco decorations by Vincenzo Angelo Orelli, such as the Homo faber suae fortunae, and Paolo Vincenzo Bonomini.

During the 19th century, some public buildings were erected. In 1809, following a royal decree issued in 1806, a public cemetery was built outside the city area (in a zone corresponding to the actual station). In 1864, following the construction of the railway, it was moved to the current location. Starting from 1825, a restoration of the city bridge was requested but only in 1834 it was approved. The works for the new bridge began in 1836 and were completed the following year.

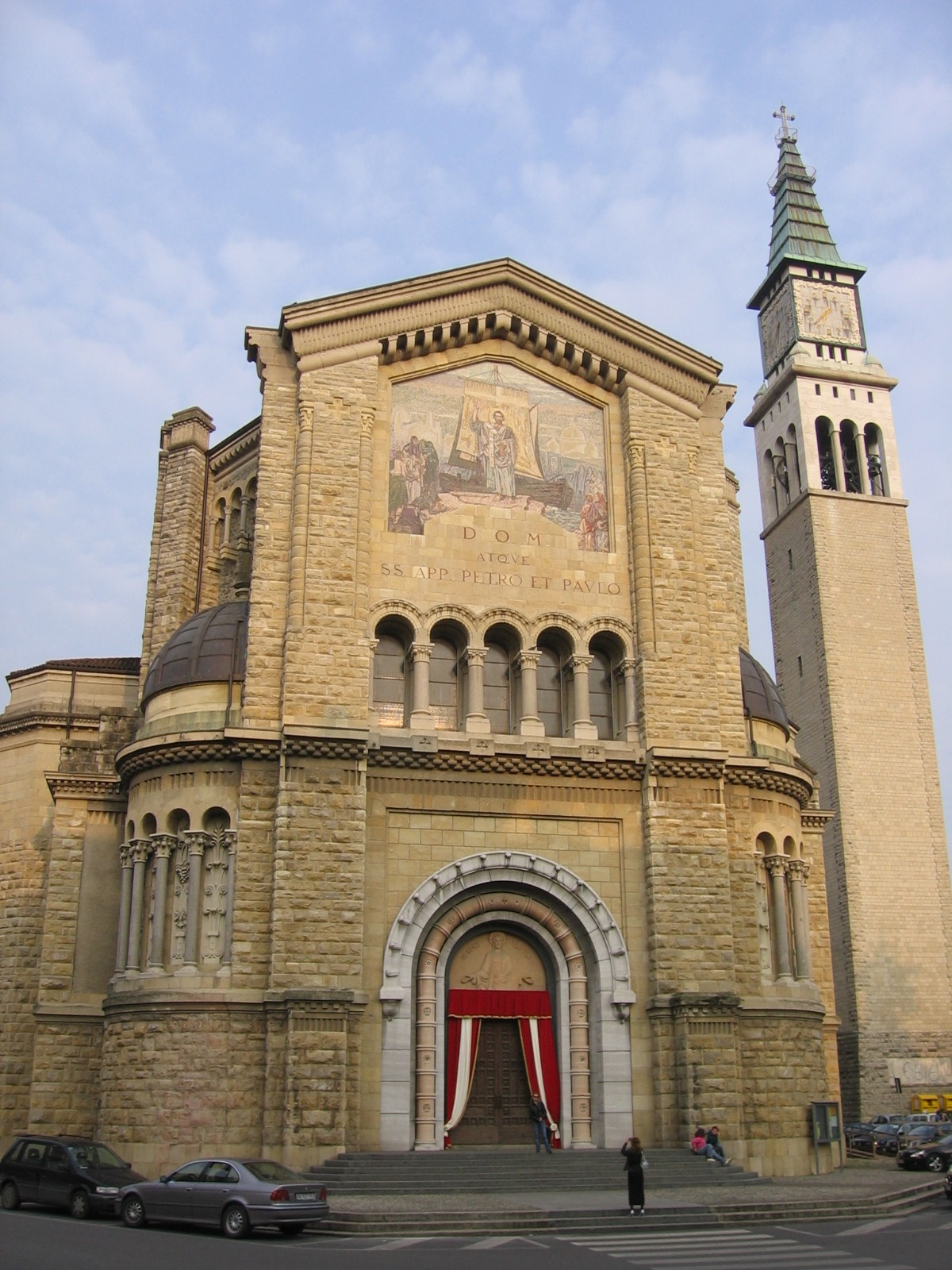
The parish church, dedicated to the Saints Peter and Paul, known as "New Church"

In 1930 were built the Remembrance Park and the so-called Famedio, the monument dedicated to the fallen of the war. In 1934, a new church dedicated to Saint Peter and Saint Paul was built in another point of the city. This church is different from the old one mainly for its size and the high bell tower (whose construction took place between 1955 and 1957). At the time it became the center of Christian meeting for both the local population and Bergamo.

Both in World War I and World War II, Ponte San Pietro was often bombed due to its bridges that allowed the supply of war material between Bergamo and Milan. The bridges were damaged by a series of raids (in November 1944 the road bridge, while on 1 January 1945, a railway bridge arch was seriously damaged) and the surrounding territory was devastated by bombs dropped from planes. From the 28 April 1916 it was the headquarters of the 1st Section of the 37th Squadron, which remained there until 25 August 1917. From 26 October 1917 until the 30 November 1918 it was the airfield of a Section of the 122nd Squadron. On 31 October 1918, the 65th Squadron born there and remained until 15 February 1919. During World War II, the first bombing occurred in July 1944 while a second, more lethal, one was in October. It destroyed a large number of city buildings. The last air raid occurred on 22 April 1945, a few days before the end of the war in Italy.

On 25 December 2009 the dam of the Brembo river was overwhelmed and destroyed by water due to a malfunction. It was later replaced by a new one with a completely different mechanism.

== Demographics ==
=== Demographic evolution ===
According to ISTAT, on 31 December 2019 there were 11,490 residents.

=== Ethnic groups ===
As of 31 December 2019, the foreign residents were 2,008. The nationalities most represented on the basis of their percentage of the total resident population were:

- Senegal 273 2,38%
- Morocco 249 2,18%
- Nigeria 202 1,76%
- China 173 1,51%
- Romania 163 1,42%
- Albania 133 1,16%

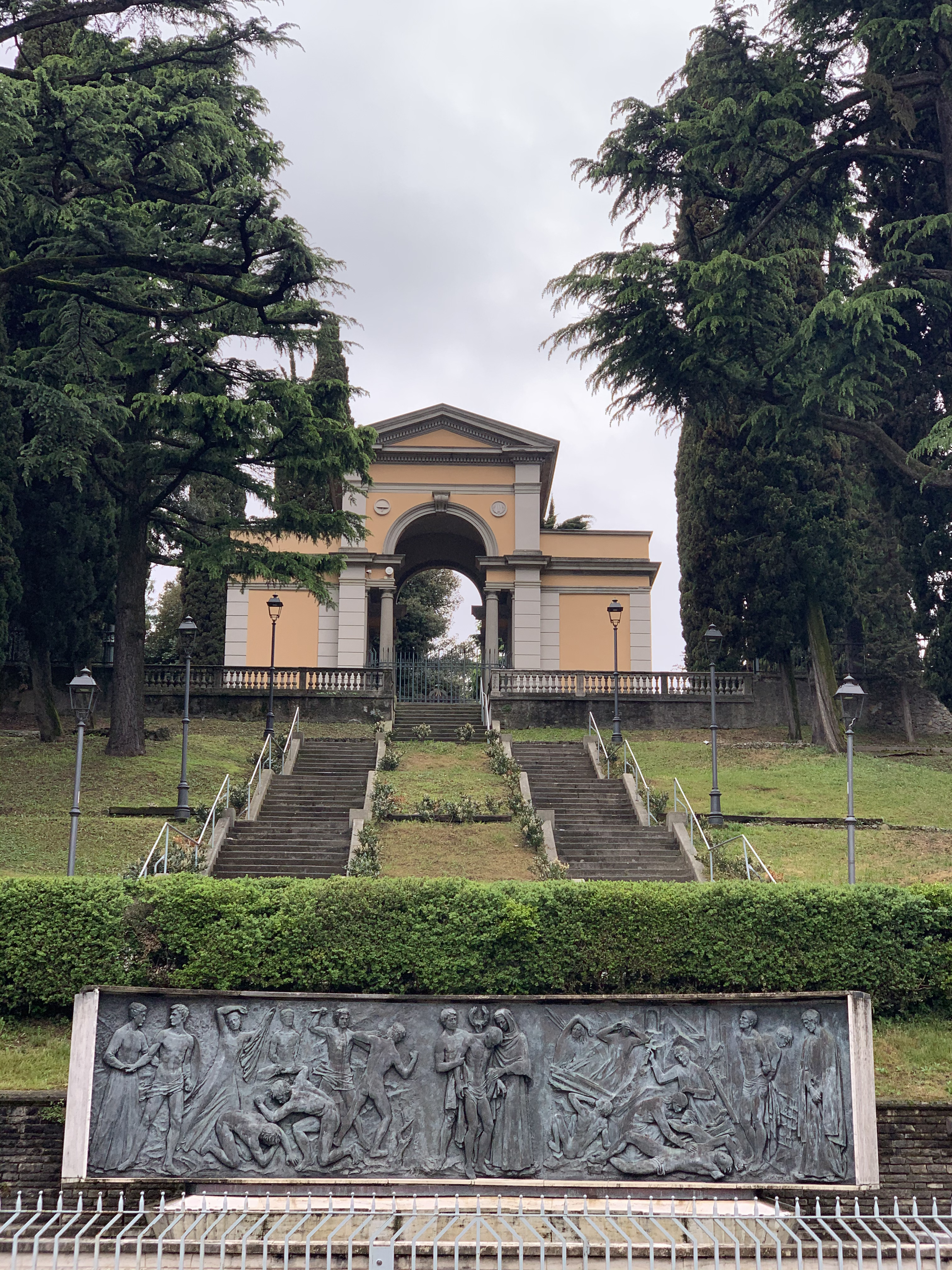
The "Famedio"

== Culture ==
The patronal festival falls on 29 June, in memory of the Saints Peter and Paul. On that occasion, there are parties and carousel in the local square and fireworks. Moreover, every 1 January the New Year arrival is celebrated with other fireworks fired directly on the "Famedio", the imposing staircase adjoining the Remembrance Park. Other minor events, for one specific district, are organised either by the Church or the oratory. During the Christmas period, Ponte San Pietro stands out for the construction of a large crib on the river bed, or for a collection of religious diorama (with nativity scenes and scenes from the life and passion of Christ) shown in the Old Church. These nativity scenes are the work of sculptors from all over the world and the occasion attracts many visitors.

== Economy ==
Due to the short distance from Bergamo, Ponte San Pietro became a transit point and a market area for trade throughout the local municipalities. Many companies have chosen to settle there since the early 20th century. In particular, it is still present but not in operation, the Legler, a textile manufacturing industry that covers several square kilometers of the city, has allowed to provide work and well-being to the people of the place (especially in the post-war period). Part of the ex-Legler complex was sold to Aruba and in the October 2017 the Global Cloud Data Center was inaugurated, becoming the group's third data center in Italy.

Other industries that have made the country vital were the aeronautical industries in the First and Second World War, including the Cantieri Aeronautici Bergamaschi (CAB) of the group Caproni (now transformed into residential neighborhoods), metallurgical industries and production of washing machines and household appliances in general.

Unlike other near towns, the local inhabitants could not afford to live on agriculture: the town, located in a natural vally of the Brembo river, did not have large plots of land for agricultural use. Therefore, the city has changed since World War II by transforming the few cultivated fields into commercial and residential areas, thanks to the services provided by Bergamo (mobility services with trains and buses, hospital and health services, various public offices).

Today the city mainly lives on trade, textile and metallurgical production and since 2017 is the headquarters of the main campus of the Italian colossus of internet services Aruba.

== Transport ==
Ponte San Pietro is located along the SS 342, known as “Briantea”, that connects the city of Bergamo with Como.

The local station, placed at the junction of the Lecco-Brescia and Seregno–Bergamo lines, is served by regional trains operated by Trenord under the service contract with the Lombardy Region.

Urban and suburban public transport is provided by a bus line operated by ATB, the transport company of Bergamo. It follows the route of the previous tramway, part of the urban network of Bergamo, activated in 1925; it remained in operation until 1958.

== Governance ==
Following the local elections of 2016 Marzio Zirafa (Lega Nord), supported by a coalition formed by Lega Nord, Forza Italia, Brothers of Italy and a civic group, was elected mayor of Ponte San Pietro.

== Events ==
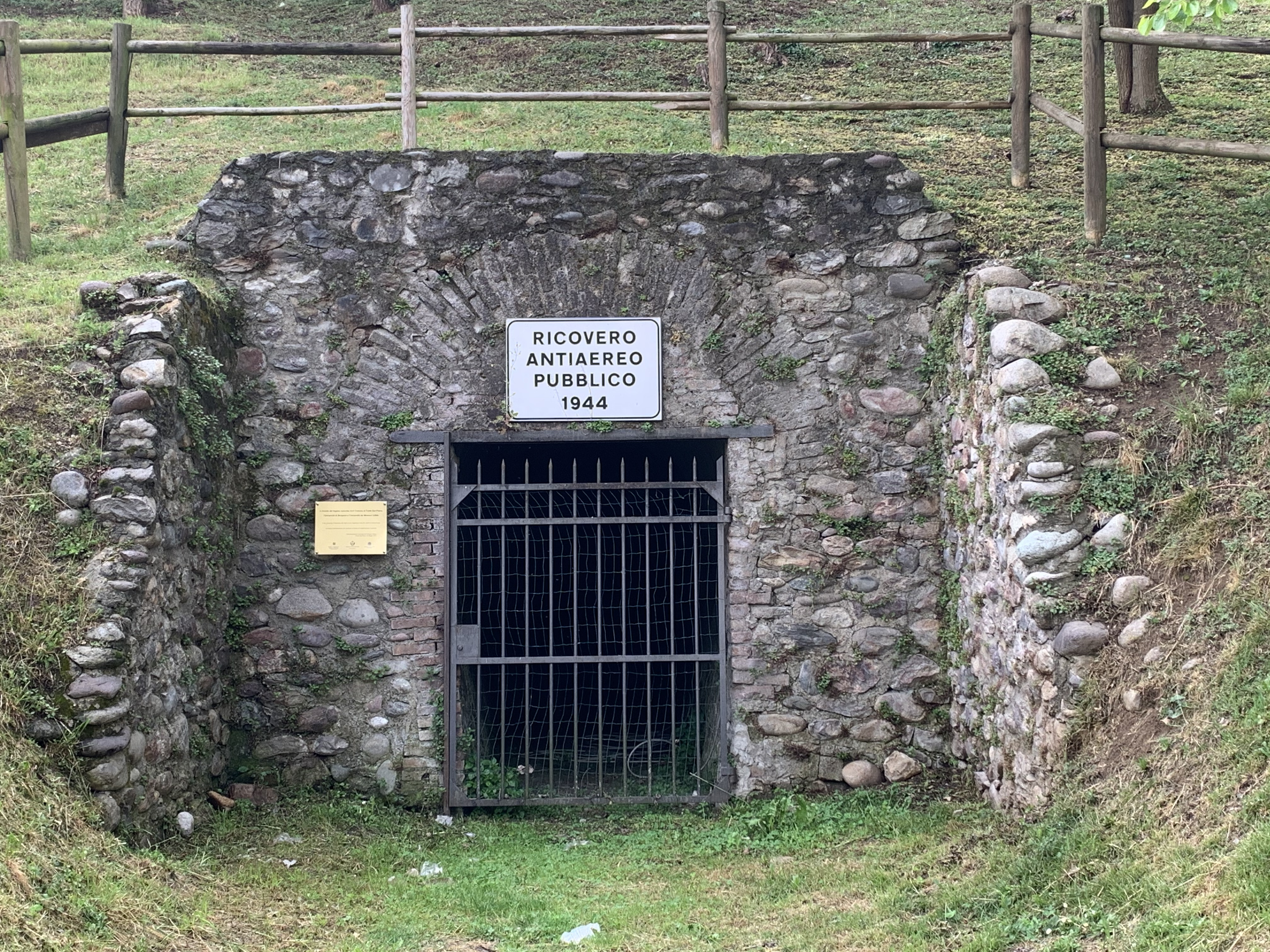
The air raid shelter in Piazza della Libertà

The patron's festival is held every 29 June. For the occasion, a fireworks display is held in the evening of the 29th and, during the last half of June, there are also rides and games prizes.

Every year, in May, the University of Missouri, USA, visits the bunker system of World War II. This events attracts hundreds of young people, professors and students from America and Italy. Since 2016, a plaque at the entrance of the air raid shelter in Piazza della Libertà recalls this partnership.

== Sport ==
The representative football team is the A.C. Ponte San Pietro Isola S.S.D. (also called Pontisola), that plays in Serie D. Also the local oratory has a football team, the U.S. Giemme (Polisportiva Ponte), and a volleyball team. There is a football team for Locate, the hamlet of the city.

== Notable people ==
- Michael Agazzi (born 3 July 1984), footballer
- Leonardo Morosini (born 13 October 1995), footballer

== Bibliography ==
- Sara Cortinovis, Una folta presenza. Artisti ticinesi attivi nelle chiesa della Beata Vergine del Giglio o "de' Rastelli" a Bergamo, in Giorgio Mollisi (a cura di), Svizzeri a Bergamo nella storia, nell'arte, nella cultura, nell'economia dal '500 ad oggi. Campionesi a Bergamo nel Medioevo, Arte&Storia, anno 10, numero 44, settembre-ottobre 2009, 147 (with a great bibliography).
- Mario Testa, Ponte S. Pietro, Brembate Sopra, Archivio storico brembatese, 1978.
