= Curno =

Municipality in Lombardy, Italy

- Comune
- Comune di Curno
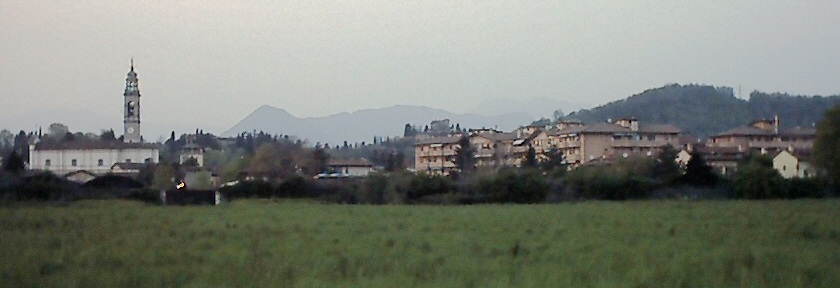
- Curno

- Location within Italy Location within Lombardy
- Coordinates: 45°41′26″N 9°36′37″E
- Country: Italy
- Region: Lombardy
- Province: Province of Bergamo (BG)
- Frazioni: Marigolda

Area
  - Total: 4.62 km^{2} (1.78 sq mi)
- Elevation: 239 m (784 ft)

Population (Dec. 2006)
  - Total: 7,590
  - Density: 1,640/km^{2} (4,250/sq mi)
- Demonym: Curnesi
- Time zone: UTC+1 (CET)
  - Summer (DST): UTC+2 (CEST)
- Postal code: 24035
- Dialing code: 035

Curno (Bergamasque: Cüren) is a municipality (Italian: comune) in the Province of Bergamo in the Italian region of Lombardy, located about 40 kilometres (25 mi) northeast of Milan and about 6 kilometres (4 mi) southwest of Bergamo. As of 31 December 2006, it had a population of 7,590 and an area of 4.62 square kilometres (1.78 mi^{2}).

The municipality of Curno contains the subdivision (frazione) status of Marigolda.

Curno borders with the following municipalities:

1. Bergamo
2. Bonate Sopra
3. Mozzo
4. Ponte San Pietro
5. Treviolo

== History ==
Before the 1960s, Curno was a village inhabited by farmers. Then, since the years of Miracolo economico, the main sector of activities has been industry. Since the first years of the 1990s, the municipality has allowed construction of many shopping malls in the area of the comune.

== Demographic evolution ==
Historical population

Year	Pop.	±%
1861	1,159	—
1871	1,139	−1.7%
1881	1,304	+14.5%
1901	1,434	+10.0%
1911	1,790	+24.8%

Year	Pop.	±%
1921	2,052	+14.6%
1931	2,418	+17.8%
1936	2,330	−3.6%
1951	2,875	+23.4%
1961	4,209	+46.4%

Year	Pop.	±%
1971	5,753	+36.7%
1981	6,466	+12.4%
1991	6,757	+4.5%
2001	7,193	+6.5%

Source: Data from ISTAT
