= Lakefront Biotherapeutics =

Belgian pharmaceutical research company

Coordinates: 51°03′19″N 4°27′08″E

- Formerly: Galapagos Genomics NV
- Type: Naamloze vennootschap
- Traded as: Euronext Amsterdam: GLPG; BEL 20 component
- ISIN: BE0003818359
- Industry: Pharmaceutical
- Founded: 1999
- Headquarters: Mechelen, Belgium
- Key people: Henry Gosebruch (CEO); Jérôme Contamine (Chairman)
- Products: Filgotinib; GLPG1205; GLPG0778
- Revenue: €288.836 million (2018)
- Net income: €-29.259 million (2018)
- Total assets: €1,439.496 million (2018)
- Total equity: €1,214.249 million (2018)
- Number of employees: 725 (2018)
- Website: lakefrontbio.com

Lakefront Biotherapeutics (formerly known as Galapagos NV and Galapagos Genomics) is a Belgian pharmaceutical research company which was founded in 1999. Its headquarters are located in Mechelen and has additional locations in Leiden, Romainville, Basel, Milan, Madrid, Boston and Zagreb.

The company develops drugs against rheumatoid arthritis, Crohn's disease, ulcerative colitis, psoriasis, systemic lupus erythematosus and cystic fibrosis.

== History ==
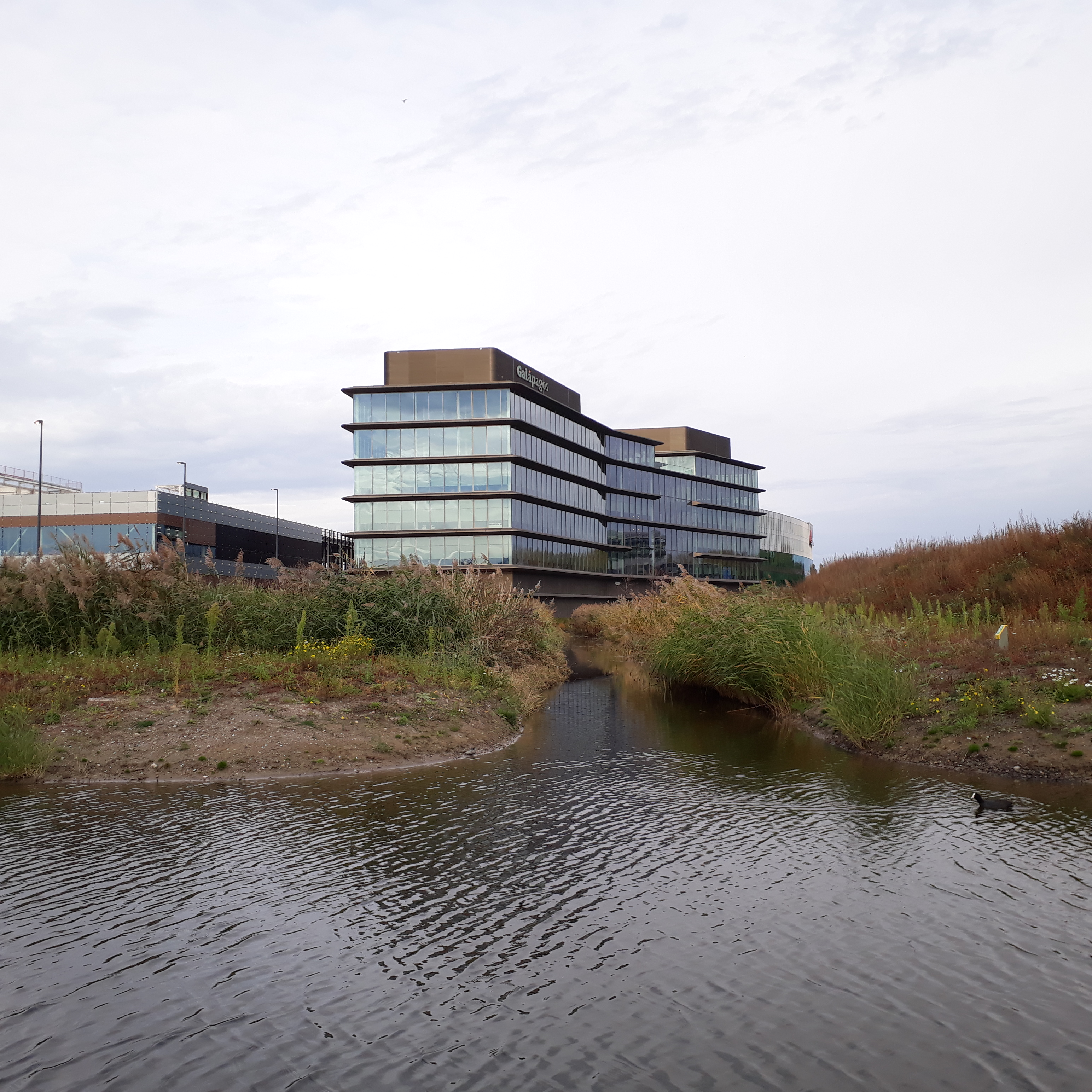
Galapagos (Leiden branch, 2022)

Galapagos Genomics NV was founded in 1999 as a joint venture between Crucell and Tibotec. The company later changed its name to Galapagos NV and completed its initial public offering on Euronext Amsterdam and Euronext Brussels in May 2005.

The company uses a technological platform for its research, which is based on adenoviruses to introduce human gene sequences into a wide variety of human cell lines to knock-in or knock-down specific proteins.

In 2019, Gilead Sciences and Galapagos entered into transformative research and development collaboration. Gilead and Galapagos have also agreed to amend certain terms around the development and commercialization of filgotinib.

In June 2022, the business announced it would acquire CellPoint for €125 million, with milestones of up to €100 million and AboundBio for $14million.

Effective April 1, 2022 Paul Stoffels replaced cofounder and CEO of 20 years Onno van de Stolpe.

In April 2026 the company was renamed to Lakefront Biotherapeutics.

== Company ==
A German company, Galapagos Biopharma Germany GmbH, was established in 2019 and is headquartered in Munich, Germany. In December 2021, the company established an Austrian subsidiary, Galapagos Biopharma Austria GmbH, headquartered in Vienna, Austria.

== Drugs ==
- Filgotinib (GLPG0634) a selective inhibitor of JAK1 (Janus kinase 1) being developed for the treatment of rheumatoid arthritis and potentially Crohn's disease.
- GLPG1205: a first-in-class GPR84-inhibitor currently under research for the treatment of inflammatory bowel disease.
