= Valbrembo =

- Comune
- Comune di Valbrembo
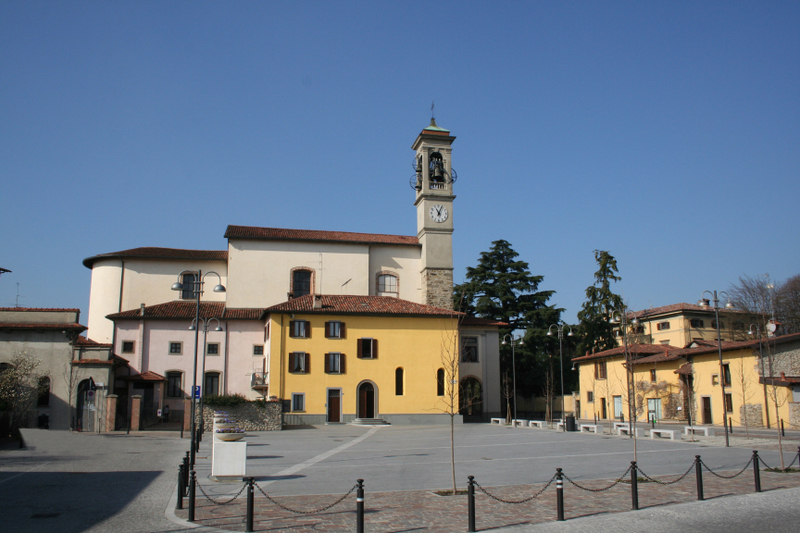
- Municipal square

- Location within Italy Location within Lombardy
- Coordinates: 45°43′N 9°37′E
- Country: Italy
- Region: Lombardy
- Province: Bergamo (BG)

Government
  - Mayor: Claudio Ferrini

Area
  - Total: 3.8 km^{2} (1.5 sq mi)
- Elevation: 261 m (856 ft)

Population (31 May 2021)
  - Total: 4,350
  - Density: 1,100/km^{2} (3,000/sq mi)
- Demonym: Valbrembesi
- Time zone: UTC+1 (CET)
  - Summer (DST): UTC+2 (CEST)
- Postal code: 24030
- Dialing code: 035
- Website: Official website

Valbrembo (Bergamasque: Albrèmb) is a comune (municipality) in the Province of Bergamo in the Italian region of Lombardy, located about 45 kilometres (28 mi) northeast of Milan and about 4 kilometres (2 mi) northwest of Bergamo.

Valbrembo borders the following municipalities: Almenno San Bartolomeo, Bergamo, Brembate di Sopra, Mozzo, Paladina, Ponte San Pietro. Part of Valbrembo's territory is part of Parco dei Colli di Bergamo.

Since 1981, it is the seat of the Faunistic Park Le Cornelle.
