= Onno van de Stolpe =

Dutch businessman

Onno van de Stolpe (born 25 October 1959, Geldrop) is a Dutch businessman and used to be CEO of Galapagos NV, a drug discovery and development company. He retired in April 2022.

== Education ==
Van de Stolpe obtained an MSc degree from the Agricultural University in Wageningen (the Netherlands).

== Career ==
Van de Stolpe began his career as Manager Business Development at MOGEN in Leiden. Afterwards, he worked for the Netherlands Foreign Investment Agency in California, where he was responsible for recruiting biotech and medical device companies to locate in the Netherlands.

When he returned to The Netherlands, Van de Stolpe founded Galapagos NV in 1999 when he was recruited by the CEO of Crucell to set up a new genomics division for the company. He launched the division in a joint venture with Tibotec.

Since its inception, Van de Stolpe has grown Galapagos NV to almost 600 employees and is one of the largest biotechs in Europe by market cap.

== Sources ==
- De Nederlandse durfal van Galapagos (in Dutch)
- Galapagos sluit overeenkomst met Eli Lilly (in Dutch)
