= Robert Ladislav Parker =

American geophysicist and mathematician

- Born: 24 February 1942
- Education: University of Cambridge, UK
- Known for: Geophysical Inverse Theory
- Spouse: Florence Monica Dirac
- Awards: John Adam Fleming Medal Gold Medal of the Royal Astronomical Society Fellow, Royal Society of London
- Scientific career
- Fields: Geophysicist and Mathematician
- Workplaces: Scripps Institution of Oceanography
- Thesis: Geophysical Studies in Electromagnetic Induction (1966)
- Doctoral advisor: Edward Bullard

Robert L. Parker is an American geophysicist and mathematician, currently holding a Professor Emeritus of Geophysics position at the Scripps Institution of Oceanography at the University of California, San Diego in La Jolla, California.

== The Institute of Geophysics and Planetary Physics in La Jolla ==
After completing a B.A. in Natural Sciences in 1963, M.A. in 1964, and Ph.D. in 1966 in Geophysics at Downing College, Cambridge in England, Parker moved to the U.S. to work at the Institute of Geophysics and Planetary Physics (IGPP). He has subsequently built on work by Freeman Gilbert and George Backus regarding inverse theory and is a world-renowned expert on the general subject of inverse theory, having written one of the authoritative books on the subject: Geophysical Inverse Theory . He is a former director of IGPP.

== Personal life ==
Parker is a bicyclist who tracks his miles. He has also written about the energy behind bicycle physics.

== Awards ==
- John Adam Fleming Medal, American Geophysical Union (2008)
- Gold Medal of the Royal Astronomical Society (1998)
- Fellow, Royal Society of London (1989)
- Fellow, American Geophysical Union (1976)
- James B. Macelwane Medal of the American Geophysical Union (1976)
- Guggenheim Fellowship (1975)
- Sloan Fellowship (1969–1971)
- Downing College Bye Fellowship (1965–1966)
- Downing College, Major Open Scholarship (1960–1963)
- State Scholarship Grant (1960–1963
