= Frank E. Snodgrass =

American physical oceanographer and electrical engineer

Frank Edwin Snodgrass
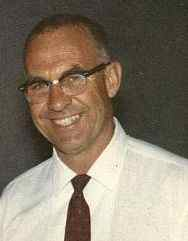
- Snodgrass in 1970
- Born: February 9, 1920; Red Lodge, Montana
- Died: June 29, 1985 (aged 65); Silverton, Oregon
- Known for: Works in fields of Oceanography, geophysics and electrical engineering.
- Awards: Marine Technology Society's first Award for Ocean Science and Engineering (1969, co-recipient with Walter Munk); Institute of Electrical and Electronics Engineers' Award (IEEE), Doctor of Science, Flinders University, Australia (1970)

Frank Edwin Snodgrass (February 9, 1920 – June 29, 1985) was a physical oceanographer and electrical engineer. He spent nearly all of his career working with Prof. Walter Munk at Scripps Institution of Oceanography (SIO). The Cecil H. and Ida M. Green branch of the University of California Systemwide Institute of Geophysics and Planetary Physics (IGPP), in La Jolla, California has been strongly linked to Scripps since the 1960s through joint faculty appointments, research interests, and shared facilities. Other IGPP branches can be found at the Los Angeles, Irvine, Santa Cruz and Riverside campuses. Snodgrass spent many years researching and measuring the ocean tides and waves. During his career he had opportunities to work with fellow scientists around the world, including collaborations through the IGPP campuses, with Woods Hole Oceanographic Institution in Massachusetts and with the National Institute of Oceanography in England.

== Early life and early career ==
Raised in Red Lodge, Montana, Frank Snodgrass joined the merchant marines as a young man, beginning what would become a lifelong connection with the sea. Trained as an electrical engineer, Snodgrass received his master's degree from the University of California, Berkeley in 1952 where he worked with other scientists in the ‘newly developing field of coastal engineering' under Joseph William Johnson.

== War years ==
Snodgrass was inducted into the Navy in 1944. He served at the Naval Training School (NTS), Great Lakes, NTS Radio Chicago and the Naval Training Center, Gulfport, Mississippi as an instructor on the radio technology program, teaching math, slide rule and radio theory. He was honorably discharged in 1946.

At the end of WWII, Snodgrass was a junior member of the group of engineers under the M. P. O'Brien, Dean of Engineering at the University of California, Berkeley. He was working with John Isaacs, Joe Johnson, and Jack Putnam on the evaluation of the amphibious DUKW vehicle when he was persuaded to join Scripps Institution of Oceanography (SIO), La Jolla, Calif., in 1953.

== Research career ==
Snodgrass joined Scripps in 1953 as an Assistant Research Engineer beginning his long association with Prof. Walter Munk. He became an Associate Research Engineer in 1961 and later a research engineer at Scripps Institution of Oceanography (SIO) and the Institute of Geophysics and Planetary Physics (IGPP) in La Jolla, California.

As a research engineer, Snodgrass' major fields of interest were oceanographic instrumentation and digital recording techniques. He was the first scientist to recall ocean instruments from the sea floor utilizing acoustic techniques,‘dropping instruments to the sea floor and recalling them some months or years later by acoustic commands.'

At IGPP Snodgrass worked alongside Prof. Walter Munk who spoke of him as ‘my partner for 23 years prior to his retirement in 1976’ – a partnership in which Munk describes Frank as ‘a superb ocean experimentalist.’ Munk and Snodgrass worked together from 1953 to 1975, co-authoring a number of papers.

Snodgrass pioneered several oceanographic techniques, including digital recording of wave pressure oscillation, the free-fall dropping of instruments to the sea floor for subsequent acoustic recall, and he was the first to design and use a portable seagoing laboratory. One of his most important contributions resulted from data collected during the early days of computers using the now antiquated system of IBM punch cards, and yet the data gathered on ocean swells was groundbreaking. It suggested that storms were being generated from very distant origins, as far as halfway around the Earth. Snodgrass installed a directional array off San Clemente Island, just off the California coast. “The results were spectacular” said Walter Munk. Data pointed to storms originating close to Antarctica and New Zealand. Subsequently, six wave stations were established to confirm this theory. Stations were established in New Zealand, Samoa, Palmyra (an uninhabited island in the Pacific), Hawaii, FLIP (an SIO special special-purpose vessel, which was moored in position for about a month), and Alaska. Snodgrass' free-fall instruments were used in each station (except FLIP) to track waves originating in the southern storm belt.

Further work using improved instruments and measuring lower frequencies led to an expedition to measure the transition of tides across the southern oceans between Australia and Antarctica. This work was eventually collated a coherent volume which earned Snodgrass the degree of Doctor of Science from Flinders University of South Australia in 1970.

Snodgrass' last instrument drops were part of the Mid-Ocean Dynamics Experiment (MODE). Combined with two other independent drops at the same location, this was “a triumph to Frank's engineering achievements.”

== Engineering achievements ==
=== Portable labs ===
Until the mid-1960s scientific gear was loaded into numerous boxes and carried on board scientific research vessels, sometimes finding that a crucial item had been left ashore. Frank Snodgrass solved this problem by designing and building a portable laboratory housing the equipment already assembled and pretested. The portable laboratory was then brought aboard, ready for action. Decks were later converted to provide bolt-downs for securing portable laboratories and this became standard practise.

=== Pressure sensors for measuring waves ===
Snodgrass adapted a "Vibrotron" transducer to measure pressure fluctuations that could be placed on the shallow seafloor in order to measure wave oscillations. Later, he found that using a quartz crystal was superior to the Vibrotron and this became the mainstay of wave measurement for many years.

=== Deep-Sea instrumented capsule ===
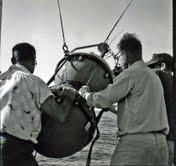
Frank E. Snodgrass and Walter H. Munk launching a Snodgrass-Designed Deep-Sea Instrumented Capsule

The deep-sea instrumented capsule was designed to transmit information to the 'mother' ship by acoustic signals. Instruments were packed into two aluminum spheres capable of withstanding pressures at a depth of three miles. Commands transmitted from the ship controlled the capsule and called it back to the surface at the end of the experiment.

Instruments attached to the capsule measured water temperature, currents, and pressure. Tidal information was obtained by measuring pressure with a sensitivity of 1/25th of an inch in three-mile depths. Nearly 50 successful drops were made with what were then state of the art deep-tide instruments.

=== Acoustic retrieval ===
Dropping instruments for later acoustic recall had its stresses: "There was a psychological block to overcome; it is not easy to let go of a line from which you have a year's budget of equipment hanging.”

== Awards ==
In 1969, Walter H. Munk and Frank Snodgrass were named co-recipients of the Marine Technology Society's first Award for Ocean Science and Engineering.

Snodgrass was later presented the Institute of Electrical and Electronic, Engineers' award for outstanding contributions to ocean engineering technology.

He was awarded a Doctor of Science degree in oceanography from Flinders University of South Australia in 1970 based on his published papers and his original contributions to oceanography as noted below.

== Published contributions ==
- Snodgrass, F. E. (1950). “Wave Recorders”, Proc. First Conference Coastal Engineering, Long Beach, Calif., Chapter 7, 69-81, 1951.
- Snodgrass, F.E. and Stiling, D.E. (1951). “Analysis of Wave Recorders”, University of California, Berkeley Institute of Engineering, Series 3, Issue 307, 13p.
- Snodgrass, F. E. (1952) “Wave measurements”, In: Conference on Oceanographic Instrumentation. Rancho Santa Fe, CA June 1952, NAS/NRC Publ. 309: 139-65.
- Snodgrass, F.E., Putz, R.R. (1954) “A direct reading wave meter”, Institute of Engineering Research, Wave Research Laboratory, Technical Report, Series 3, Issue 37.
- Snodgrass, F. E., Carrier, G. and Munk, W. H. (1956). “Edge Waves on the Continental Shelf”, Science, 123(3187):127-132.
- Snodgrass, F. E. (1956). “Mark IX Shore Wave Recorder”, In: Proc. First Conference Coastal Engineering Instruments, Chptr. 6: 61-100.
- Munk, W. H. and Snodgrass, F. E. (1957). “Measurements of southern swell at Guadalupe Island”, Deep-Sea Research, 4:272-86.
- Munk, W. H, Tucker, M. J. and Snodgrass, F. E (1957). “Remarks on the ocean wave spectrum”, In: Symposium on Naval Hydrodynamics, Publ. 515, Chptr. 3:45-60.
- Snodgrass, F. E. (1958). “Shore-based recorder of low-frequency ocean waves”, Trans. Am. Geophys. Union, 39(1):109-13.
- Snodgrass, F. E, Munk, W. H. and Tucker. M. J. (1958). “Offshore recording of low-frequency ocean waves”, Trans. Am. Geophys. Union, 39(1):114-20.
- Snodgrass, F. E. and Putz, Robert R. (1958). “A wave height and frequency meter”, In: Proc. Sixth Int’l. Conference Coastal Engineering, Chptr. 13:209-24.
- Munk, W. H., Snodgrass, F. E. and Tucker, M. J. (1959). “Spectra of low-frequency ocean waves”, Scripps Institution of Oceanography Bulletin, 7:283-362.
- Snodgrass, F. E. (1960) “Ocean waves”, McGraw-Hill Encyclopedia of Science, 1st Edition: 259-260.
- Snodgrass, F. E. (1961). “Ocean wave spectra”, In: Proc. of panel discussion NAS Conf., Easton, MD:333-45.
- Snodgrass, F. E., Munk, W. H. and Miller, G. R. (1962). “Long-period waves over California’s continental borderland. Part I. Background Spectra”, J. Mar. Res., 20(1):3-30.
- Miller, G. R., Munk, W. H. and Snodgrass, F. E. (1962). “Long-period waves over California’s continental borderland. Part II. Tsunamis”, J. Mar. Res., 20(1):31-41.
- Munk, W. H., Miller, G. R. and Snodgrass, F. E. (1962). “Long-period waves over California’s continental borderland. Part III. The decay of tsunamis and the dissipation of tidal energy”, J. Mar. Res., 20(1):119-20.
- Haubrich, R. H., Munk, W. H. and Snodgrass, F. E. (1963). “Comparative spectra of microseisms and swell”, Bull. Seismol. Soc. Am., 53(1):27-37.
- Munk, W. H., G. R. Miller, F. E. Snodgrass, and N. F. Barber. “Directional recording of swell from distant storm”, Philos. Trans. R. Soc. London, Ser. A, No. 1062, 255:505-84.
- Munk, W. H., Snodgrass, F. E. and Gilbert, F. (1964). “Long waves on the continental shelf: an experiment to separate trapped and leaky modules”, J. Fluid Mech. 20(4):529-54.
- Snodgrass. F. E. (1964). “Precision digital tide gauge”, Science, 146(3641):198-208.
- Snodgrass. F. E. (1964). “How to tell breakwaters from elephants”, The Seahorse, 1(4):1&4-5.
- Snodgrass, F. E., Groves, G. W., Hasselmann, K. F., Miller, G. R., Munk, W. H. and Powers, W. H. (1966). “Propagation of ocean swells across the Pacific”, Philos. Trans. R. Soc. London, Ser. A, No. 1103, 259:431-97.
- Snodgrass. F. E. (1968). “Deep sea instrument capsule”, Science, 162:78-87.
- Caldwell, D. R., Snodgrass, F. E. and Wimbush, M. H. (1969). “Sensors in the deep sea”, Physics Today, 22(7):34-42.
- Snodgrass, F. E. (1969). “Study of ocean waves, 10~5 to 1 Hz”, Survey Paper No. 8, Horace Lamb Centre, Flinders, University of Australia, 41 pp.
- Munk, W. H., Snodgrass, F. E. and Wimbush, M. (1970). “Tides off shore: transition from California coastal to deep-sea waters”, Geophys. Fluid Dyn., 1(1):161-235.
- Snodgrass, F. E. (1971). “Elqntin Cruise 41”, Antarctic Journal of the U.S. Vol. VI, No. 1: 14-17.
- Irish, J. D., Munk, W. H. and Snodgrass, F. E. (1971). “M2 amphidrome in the Northeast Pacific”, Geophys. Fluid Dyn., 2:355-60.
- Irish, J. D. and Snodgrass, F. E. (1972). “Quartz crystals as multipurpose oceanographic sensors-1 pressure”, Deep-Sea Research, 19:165-69.
- Irish, J. D. and Snodgrass, F. E. (1972). “Australian-Antarctic tides”, Antarctic Research Series, 19 (Antarctic Oceanology II):110-16.
- Brown, W., Munk, W. H., Snodgrass, F. E. and Zetler, B. (1973). “Bottom pressures in the MODE region”, MODE Hotline News, 37:1,4.
- Munk, W. H., Snodgrass, F. E. and Zetler, B. (1973). “Oceanography from the bottom up”, Naval Res. Rev., 26(9):18-24.
- Snodgrass, F. E. and Wimbush, M. (1974). “Evaluation of deep sea tide gauge sensors”, In: Proc. IEEE Intl. Conf. Engineering in the Ocean Environment, Halifax, NS, 1:350-53.
- F. E. Snodgrass, Brown, W. and Munk, W. H. (1975). “MODE: IGPP measurements of bottom pressure and temperature”, J. Phys. Oceanogr., 5(1):64-74.
- Brown, W., Munk, W. H., Snodgrass, F. E., Mojfeld, H. and Zetler, B. (1975). “MODE bottom experiment”, J. Phys. Oceanogr, 5(1):75-85.

== Documentaries and films ==
"Waves Across the Pacific" (1963) is a documentary that showcases Munk's research on waves generated by Antarctic storms. The film documents Munk's collaboration as they track storm-driven waves from Antarctica across the Pacific Ocean to Alaska. The film features scenes of early digital equipment in use in field experiments with Munk's commentary on how unsure they were about using such new technology in remote locations.
