= Walter Munk =

American oceanographer (1917–2019)

- Munk in 1956
- Born: Walter Heinrich Munk; October 19, 1917; Vienna, Austria-Hungary
- Died: February 8, 2019 (aged 101); La Jolla, California, U.S.
- Education: Columbia University; California Institute of Technology (BS, MS); Scripps Institution of Oceanography/University of California, Los Angeles (PhD)
- Awards: Maurice Ewing Medal (1976); Alexander Agassiz Medal (1976); National Medal of Science (1985); Bakerian Lecture (1986); William Bowie Medal (1989); Vetlesen Prize (1993); Kyoto Prize (1999); Prince Albert I Medal (2001); Crafoord Prize (2010)
- Scientific career
- Fields: Oceanography, geophysics
- Thesis: Increase in the period of waves traveling over large distances : with applications to tsunamis, swell, and seismic surface waves (1946)
- Doctoral advisor: Harald Ulrik Sverdrup
- Doctoral students: Charles Shipley Cox, June Pattullo

Walter Heinrich Munk (October 19, 1917 – February 8, 2019) was an American physical oceanographer. He was one of the first scientists to bring statistical methods to the analysis of oceanographic data. Munk worked on a wide range of topics, including surface waves, geophysical implications of variations in the Earth's rotation, tides, internal waves, deep-ocean drilling into the sea floor, acoustical measurements of ocean properties, sea level rise, and climate change. His work won awards including the National Medal of Science, the Kyoto Prize, and induction to the French Legion of Honour.

Munk's career began before the outbreak of World War II and ended nearly 80 years later with his death in 2019. The war interrupted his doctoral studies at the Scripps Institution of Oceanography (Scripps), and led to his participation in U.S. military research efforts. Munk and his doctoral advisor Harald Sverdrup developed methods for forecasting wave conditions which were used in support of beach landings in all theaters of the war. He was involved with oceanographic programs during the atomic bomb tests in Bikini Atoll.

Beginning in 1975, Munk and Carl Wunsch developed ocean acoustic tomography to exploit the ease with which sound travels in the ocean and use acoustical signals for measurement of broad-scale temperature and current. In a 1991 experiment, Munk and his collaborators investigated the ability of underwater sound to propagate from the Southern Indian Ocean across all ocean basins, with the aim of measuring global ocean temperature. The experiment was criticized by environmental groups, who expected that the loud acoustic signals would adversely affect marine life. Munk continued to develop and advocate for acoustical measurements of the ocean throughout his career.

For most of his career, he was a professor of geophysics at Scripps. Additionally, Munk and his wife Judy were active in developing the Scripps campus and integrating it with the new University of California, San Diego. Munk's career included being a member of the JASON think tank, and holding the Secretary of the Navy/Chief of Naval Operations Oceanography Chair.

== Early life and education ==
In 1917, Munk was born to a Jewish family in Vienna, Austria-Hungary. His father, Dr. Hans Munk, and his mother, Rega Brunner, divorced when he was ten years old. His maternal grandfather was Lucian Brunner (1850–1914), a prominent banker and Austrian politician. His stepfather, Dr. Rudolf Engelsberg, was head of the salt mine monopoly of the Austrian government and a member of the Austrian governments of Chancellor Engelbert Dollfuss and Chancellor Kurt Schuschnigg.

In 1932, Munk was performing poorly in school because he was spending too much time skiing, so his family sent him from Austria to a boys' preparatory school in upper New York state. His family envisioned a career for him in finance with a New York bank connected to the family business. He worked at the family's banking firm for three years and studied at Columbia University.

Munk hated banking. In 1937, he left the firm to attend the California Institute of Technology (Caltech) in Pasadena. While at Caltech, he took a summer job in 1939 at the Scripps Institution of Oceanography (Scripps) in La Jolla, California. Munk earned a B.S. in applied physics in 1939 and an M.S. in geophysics (under Beno Gutenberg) in 1940 at Caltech. The master's degree work was based on oceanographic data collected in the Gulf of California by the Norwegian oceanographer Harald Sverdrup, then director of Scripps.

In 1939, Munk asked Sverdrup to take him on as a doctoral student. Sverdrup agreed, although Munk recalled him saying "I can't think of a single job that's going to become available in the next ten years in oceanography". Munk's studies were interrupted by the outbreak of World War II. He completed his doctoral degree in oceanography at Scripps under the University of California, Los Angeles in 1947. He wrote it in three weeks and it is the "shortest Scripps dissertation on record." He later realized that its principal conclusion is wrong.

== Wartime activities ==
In 1940, Munk enlisted the U.S. Army. This was unusual for a student at Scripps: all the others joined the U.S. Naval Reserve. After serving 18 months in Field Artillery and the Ski Troops, he was discharged at the request of Sverdrup and Roger Revelle so he could undertake defense-related research at Scripps. In December 1941, a week before the Japanese Attack on Pearl Harbor, he joined several of his colleagues from Scripps at the U.S. Navy Radio and Sound Laboratory. For six years they developed methods related to antisubmarine and amphibious warfare. This research involved marine acoustics, and eventually led to his work on ocean acoustic tomography.

=== Predicting surf conditions for Allied landings ===
In 1943, Munk and Sverdrup began looking for a way to predict the heights of ocean surface waves. The Allies were preparing for a landing in North Africa, where two out of every three days the waves are above six feet. Practice beach landings in the Carolinas were suspended when waves reached this height because they were dangerous to people and landing craft. Munk and Sverdrup found an empirical law that related wave height and period to the speed and duration of the wind and the distance over which it blows. The Allies applied this method in the Pacific theater of war and the Normandy invasion on D-Day.

Officials at the time estimated that many lives were saved by these predictions. Munk commented in 2009:

The Normandy landing is famous because weather conditions were very poor and you may not realize it was postponed by General Eisenhower for 24 hours because of the prevailing wave conditions. And then he did decide, in spite of the fact that conditions were not favorable, it would be better to go in than lose the surprise element, which would have been lost if they waited for the next tidal cycle [in] two weeks.

=== Oceanographic measurements during atomic weapons tests in the Pacific ===
In 1946, the United States tested two fission nuclear weapons (20 kilotons) at Bikini Atoll in the equatorial Pacific in Operation Crossroads. Munk helped to determine the currents, diffusion, and water exchanges affecting the radiation contamination from the second test, code-named Baker. Six years later he returned to the equatorial Pacific for the 1952 test of the first fusion nuclear weapon (10 megatons) at Eniwetok Atoll, code-named Ivy Mike. Roger Revelle, John Isaacs, and Munk had initiated a program for monitoring for the possibility of a large tsunami generated from the test.

=== Later association with the military ===
Munk continued to have a close association with the military in later decades. He was one of the first academics to be funded by the Office of Naval Research, and had his last grant from them when he was 97. In 1968, he became a member of JASON, a panel of scientists who advise the Pentagon, and he continued in that role until the end of his life. He held a Secretary of the Navy/Chief of Naval Operations Oceanography Chair from 1985 until his death in 2019.

== Institute of Geophysics and Planetary Physics ==
After receiving his doctorate in 1947, Munk was hired by Scripps as an assistant professor of geophysics. He became a full professor there in 1954, but his appointment was at the Institute of Geophysics (IGP) at the University of California, Los Angeles (UCLA). In 1955, Munk took a sabbatical at Cambridge, England. His experience at Cambridge led to the idea of starting a new IGP branch at Scripps.

At the time of Munk's return to Scripps, it was still under the administration of UCLA, as it had been since 1938. It became part of the University of California, San Diego (UCSD) when that campus was founded in 1958. Revelle, its director at the time, was a primary advocate for establishing the La Jolla campus. At this time Munk was considering offers for new positions at the Massachusetts Institute of Technology and Harvard University, but Revelle encouraged Munk to remain in La Jolla. Munk's founding of IGP at La Jolla was concurrent with the creation of the UCSD campus.

The IGPP laboratory was built between 1959 and 1963 with funding from the University of California, the U.S. Air Force Office of Scientific Research, the National Science Foundation, and private foundations. (After planetary physics was added, IGP changed its name to the Institute of Geophysics and Planetary Physics (IGPP).) The redwood building was designed by architect Lloyd Ruocco, in close consultation with Judith and Walter Munk. The IGPP buildings have become the center of the Scripps campus. Among the early faculty appointments were Carl Eckart, George Backus, Freeman Gilbert and John Miles. The eminent geophysicist Sir Edward "Teddy" Bullard was a regular visitor to IGPP. In 1971 an endowment of $600,000 was established by Cecil Green to support visiting scholars, now known as Green Scholars. Munk served as director of IGPP/LJ from 1962 to 1982.

In the late 1980s, plans for an expansion of IGPP were developed by Judith and Walter Munk, and Sharyn and John Orcutt, in consultation with a local architect, Fred Liebhardt. The Revelle Laboratory was completed in 1993. At this time the original IGPP building was renamed the Walter and Judith Munk Laboratory for Geophysics. In 1994 the Scripps branch of IGPP was renamed the Cecil H. and Ida M. Green Institute of Geophysics and Planetary Physics.

== Research ==
Munk's career in oceanography and geophysics touched on disparate and innovative topics. A pattern of Munk's work was that he would initiate a completely new topic; ask challenging, fundamental questions about the subject and its larger meaning; and then, having created an entirely new sub-field of science, move on to another new topic. As Carl Wunsch, one of Munk's frequent collaborators, commented:

[Walter has] a sometimes uncanny ability to delineate the essence—that had eluded his predecessors—of a central problem. He has the knack of defining a field in a way that requires decades of subsequent work by others to fully flesh-out, while he himself moves on. One of his explicitly stated themes is that it is more important to ask the right questions than it is to give the right answers.

=== Wind-driven gyres ===
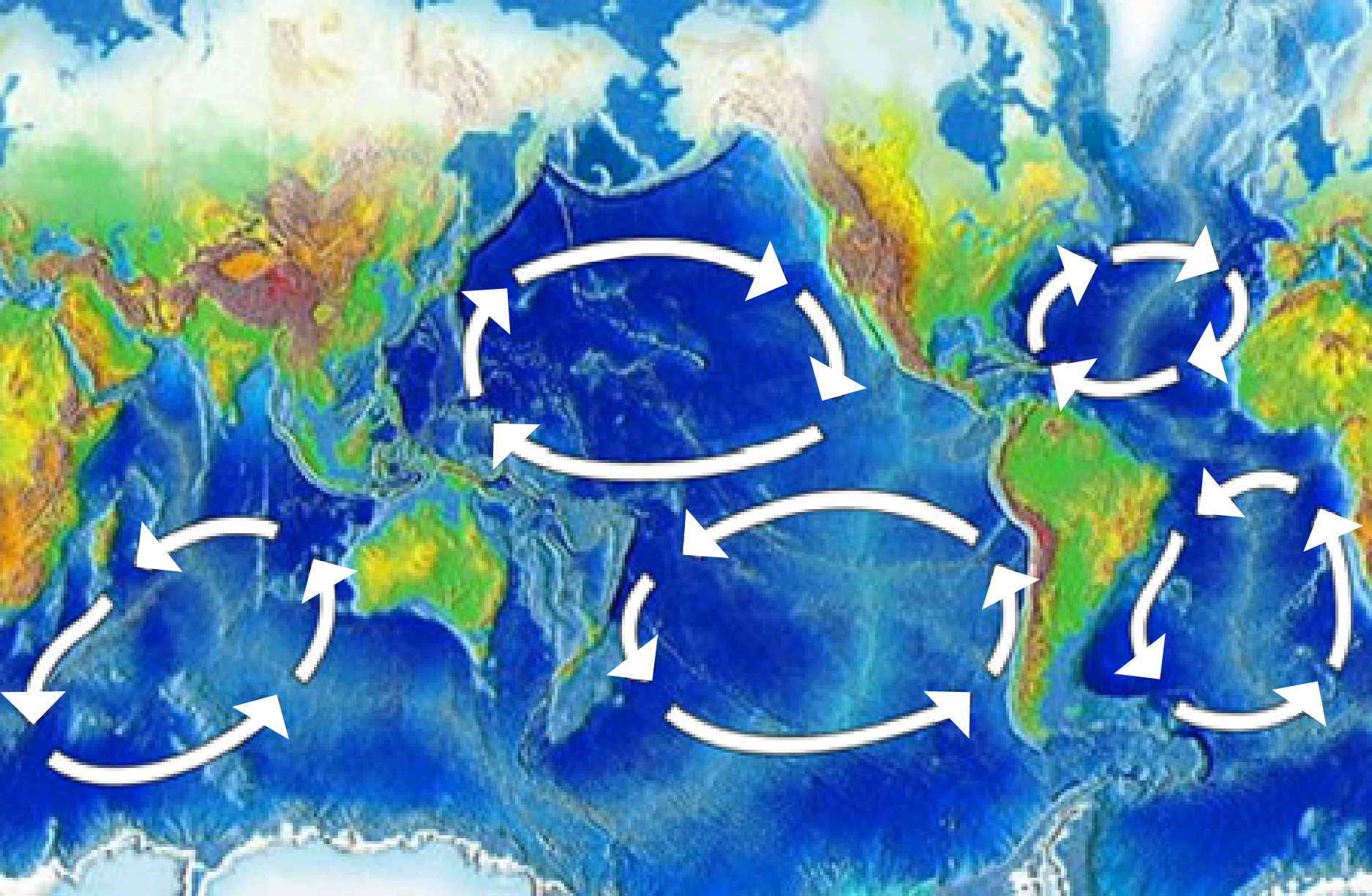
World map of the five major ocean gyres

In 1948, Munk took a year's sabbatical to visit Sverdrup in Oslo, Norway on his first Guggenheim Fellowship. He worked on the problem of wind-driven ocean circulation, obtaining the first comprehensive solution for currents based on observed wind patterns. This included two types of friction: horizontal friction between water masses moving at different velocities or between water and the edges of the oceanic basin, and friction from a vertical velocity gradient in the top layer of the ocean (the Ekman layer).

The model predicted the five main ocean gyres (pictured), with rapid, narrow currents in the west flowing towards the poles and broader, slower currents in the east flowing away from the poles. Munk coined the term "ocean gyres," a term now widely used. The currents predicted for the western boundaries (e.g., for the Gulf Stream and the Kuroshio Current) were about half of the accepted values at the time, but those only considered the most intense flow and neglected a large return flow. Later estimates agreed well with Munk's predictions.

=== Rotation of the Earth ===
In the 1950s, Munk investigated irregularities in the Earth's rotation – changes in the length of day (rate of the Earth's rotation) and changes in the axis of rotation (such as the Chandler wobble, which has a period of about 14 months). The latter gives rise to a small tide called the pole tide. Although the scientific community knew of these fluctuations, they did not have adequate explanations for them. With Gordon J. F. MacDonald, Munk published The Rotation of the Earth: A Geophysical Discussion in 1960. This book discusses the effects from a geophysical, rather than astronomical, perspective. It shows that short-term variations are caused by movement in the atmosphere, ocean, underground water, and interior of the Earth, including tides in the ocean and solid Earth. Over longer times (a century or more), the largest influence is the tidal acceleration that causes the Moon to move away from the Earth at about four centimeters per year. This gradually slows Earth's rotation, so that over 500 million years the length of day has increased from 21 hours to 24. The monograph remains a standard reference.

=== Project Mohole ===
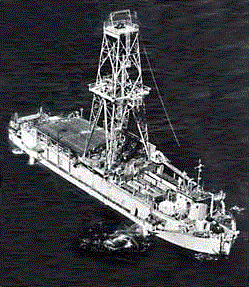
Project Mohole contracted with a consortium of oil companies to use their oil drillship CUSS I.

In 1957, Munk and Harry Hess suggested the idea behind Project Mohole: to drill into the Mohorovičić discontinuity and obtain a sample of the Earth's mantle. While such a project was not feasible on land, drilling in the open ocean would be more feasible, because the mantle is much closer to the sea floor. Initially led by the informal group of scientists known as the American Miscellaneous Society (AMSOC), a group that included Hess, Maurice Ewing, and Roger Revelle, the project was eventually taken over by the National Science Foundation. Initial test drillings into the sea floor led by Willard Bascom occurred off Guadalupe Island, Mexico in March and April 1961. However, the project was mismanaged and grew in expense after the construction company Brown and Root won the contract to continue the effort. Toward the end of 1966, Congress discontinued the project. While Project Mohole was not successful, the idea and its innovative initial phase directly led to the successful NSF Deep Sea Drilling Program for obtaining sediment cores.

=== Ocean swell ===
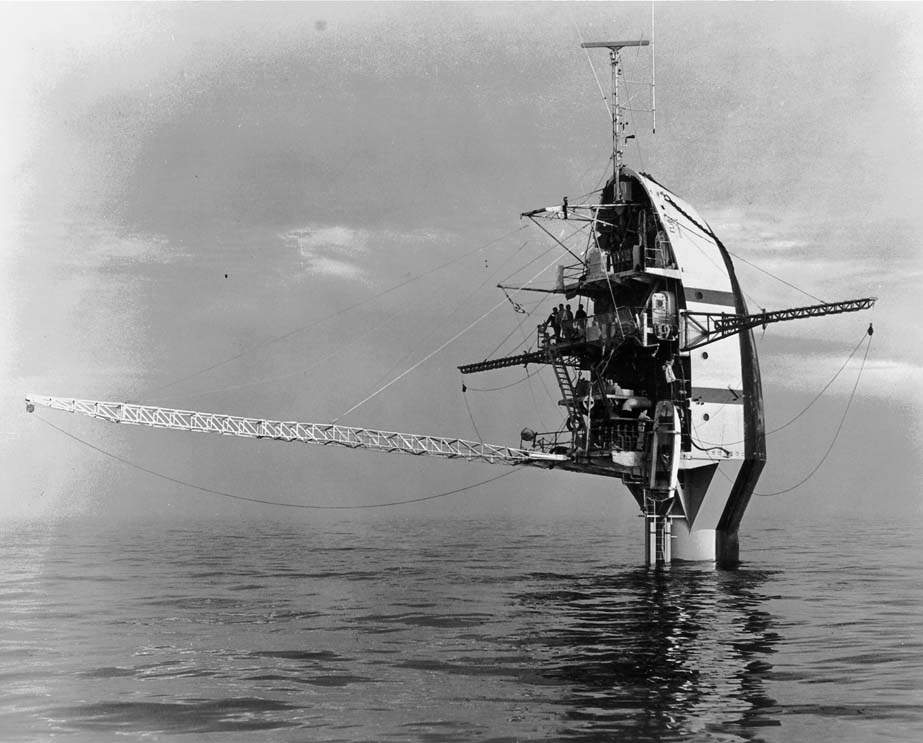
Munk used R/P FLIP to measure waves traveling across ocean basins.

Starting in the late 1950s, Munk returned to the study of ocean waves. Thanks to his acquaintance with John Tukey, he pioneered the use of power spectra in describing wave behavior. This work culminated with an expedition that he led in 1963 called "Waves Across the Pacific" to observe waves generated by storms in the Southern Indian Ocean. Such waves traveled northward for thousands of miles across the Pacific Ocean. To trace the path and decay of the waves, he established measurement stations on islands and at sea (on R/P FLIP) along a great circle from New Zealand, to the Palmyra Atoll, and finally to Alaska. Munk and his family spent nearly the whole of 1963 on American Samoa for this experiment. Walter and Judith Munk collaborated in making a film to document the experiment. The results show little decay of wave energy with distance traveled. This work, together with the wartime work on wave forecasting, led to the science of surf forecasting, one of Munk's best-known accomplishments. Munk's pioneering research into surf forecasting was acknowledged in 2007 with an award from the Groundswell Society, a surfing advocacy organization. (Note: In 2019, the Groundswell Society established the Dr. Walter Munk Scholarship "to support a student intending to pursue a career in oceanography, meteorology, or marine biology.")

=== Ocean tides ===
Between 1965 and 1975, Munk turned to investigations of ocean tides, partly motivated by their effects on the Earth's rotation. Modern methods of time series and spectral analysis were brought to bear on tidal analysis, leading to work with David Cartwright developing the "response method" of tidal analysis. With Frank Snodgrass, Munk developed deep-ocean pressure sensors that could be used to provide tidal data far from any land. One highlight of this work was the discovery of the semidiurnal amphidrome midway between California and Hawaii.

=== Internal waves: The Garrett–Munk spectrum ===
At the time of Munk's dissertation for his master's degree in 1939, internal waves were considered an uncommon phenomenon. By the 1970s, there were extensive published observations of internal-wave variability in the oceans in temperature, salinity, and velocity as functions of time, horizontal distance, and depth. Motivated by a 1958 paper by Owen Philips that described a universal spectral form for the variance of ocean surface waves as a function of wave number, Chris Garrett and Munk attempted to make sense of the observations by postulating a universal spectrum for internal waves.

According to Munk, they chose a spectrum that could be factored into a function of frequency times a function of vertical wave number. The resulting spectrum, now called the Garrett-Munk Spectrum, is roughly consistent with a large number of diverse measurements that had been obtained over the global ocean. The model evolved over the subsequent decade, denoted GM72, GM75, GM79, etc., according to the year of publication of the revised model. Although Munk expected the model to be rapidly obsolete, it proved to be a universal model that is still in use. Its universality is interpreted as a sign of profound processes governing internal wave dynamics, turbulence and fine-scale mixing. Klaus Hasselmann commented in 2010, "...the publication of the GM spectrum has indeed been extremely fruitful for oceanography, both in the past and still today."

=== Ocean acoustic tomography ===
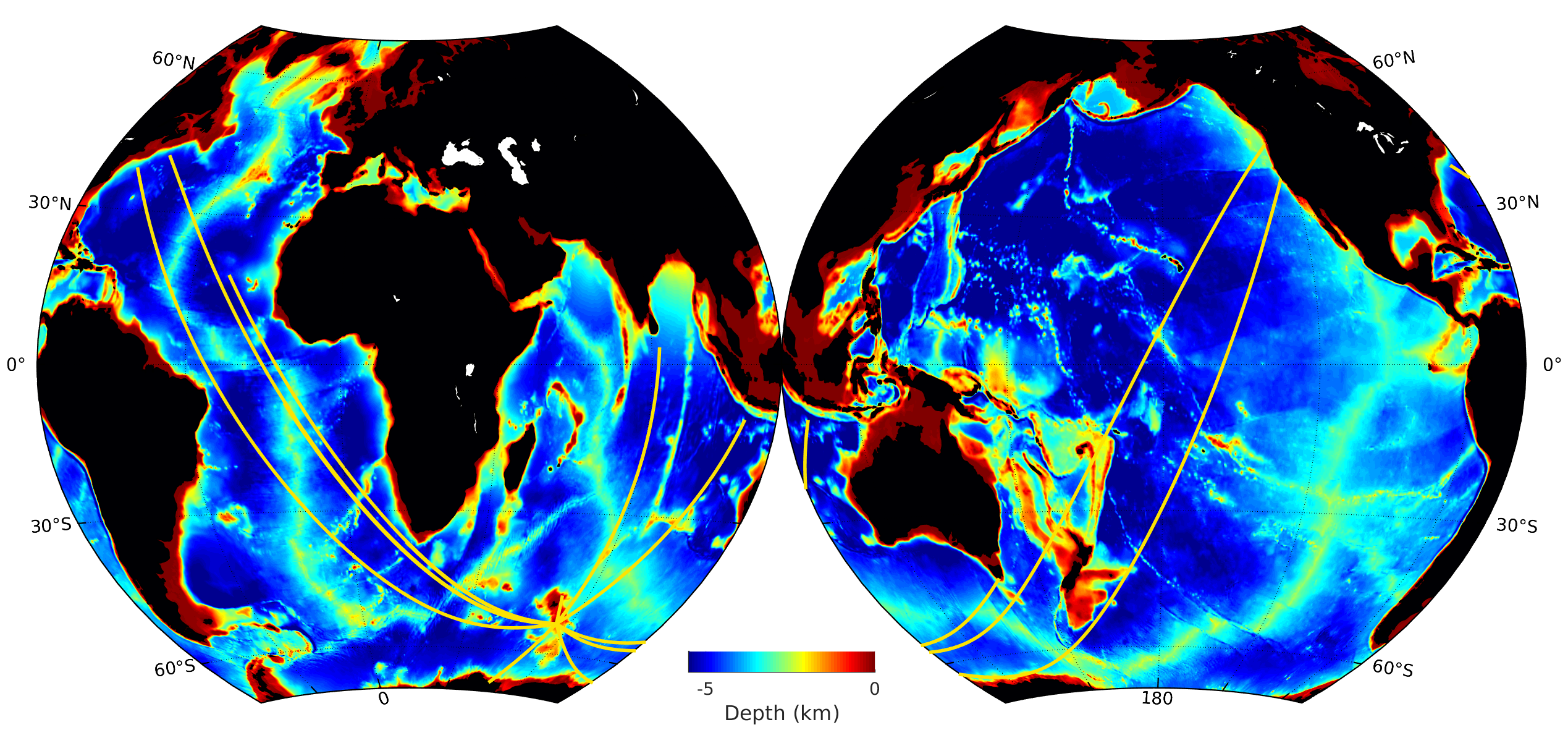
Ocean topography (see scale) and some paths traveled by sound waves during the 1991 Heard Island Feasibility Test.

Beginning in 1975, Munk and Carl Wunsch of the Massachusetts Institute of Technology pioneered the development of acoustic tomography of the ocean. With Peter Worcester and Robert Spindel, Munk developed the use of sound propagation, particularly sound arrival patterns and travel times, to infer important information about the ocean's large-scale temperature and current. This work, together with the work of other groups, eventually motivated the 1991 "Heard Island Feasibility Test" (HIFT), to determine if man-made acoustic signals could be transmitted over antipodal distances to measure the ocean's climate. The experiment came to be called "the sound heard around the world." During six days in January 1991, acoustic signals were transmitted by sound sources lowered from the M/V Cory Chouest near Heard Island in the southern Indian Ocean. These signals traveled half-way around the globe to be received on the east and west coasts of the United States, as well as at many other stations around the world.

The follow-up to this experiment was the 1996–2006 Acoustic Thermometry of Ocean Climate (ATOC) project in the North Pacific Ocean. Both HIFT and ATOC engendered considerable public controversy concerning the possible effects of man-made sounds on marine mammals. In addition to the decade-long measurements obtained in the North Pacific, acoustic thermometry has been employed to measure temperature changes of the upper layers of the Arctic Ocean basins, which continues to be an area of active interest. Acoustic thermometry has also been used to determine changes to global-scale ocean temperatures using data from acoustic pulses traveling from Australia to Bermuda.

Tomography has come to be a valuable method of ocean observation, exploiting the characteristics of long-range acoustic propagation to obtain synoptic measurements of average ocean temperature or current. Applications have included the measurement of deep water formation in the Greenland Sea in 1989, measurement of ocean tides, and the estimation of ocean mesoscale dynamics by combining tomography, satellite altimetry, and in situ data with ocean dynamical models.

Munk advocated for acoustical measurements of the ocean for much of his career, such as his 1986 Bakerian Lecture Acoustic Monitoring of Ocean Gyres, the 1995 monograph Ocean Acoustic Tomography written with Worcester and Wunsch, and his 2010 Crafoord Prize lecture The Sound of Climate Change.

=== Tides and mixing ===
In the 1990s, Munk returned to the work on the role of tides in producing mixing in the ocean. In a 1966 paper "Abyssal Recipes", Munk was one of the first to assess quantitatively the rate of mixing in the abyssal ocean in maintaining oceanic stratification. At that time, the tidal energy available for mixing was thought to occur by processes near ocean boundaries. According to Sandström's theorem (1908), without the occurrence deep mixing, driven by, e.g., internal tides or tidally-driven turbulence in shallow regions, most of the ocean would become cold and stagnant, capped by a thin, warm surface layer. The question of tidal energy available for mixing was reawakened in the 1990s with the discovery, by acoustic tomography and satellite altimetry, of large-scale internal tides radiating energy away from the Hawaiian Ridge into the interior of the North Pacific Ocean. Munk recognized that the tidal energy from the scattering and radiation of large-scale internal waves from mid-ocean ridges was significant, hence it could drive abyssal mixing.

=== Munk's enigma ===
In his later work, Munk focused on the relation between changes in ocean temperature, sea level, and the transfer of mass between continental ice and the ocean. This work described what came to be known as "Munk's enigma", a large discrepancy between observed rate of sea level rise and its expected effects on the earth's rotation.

== Awards ==
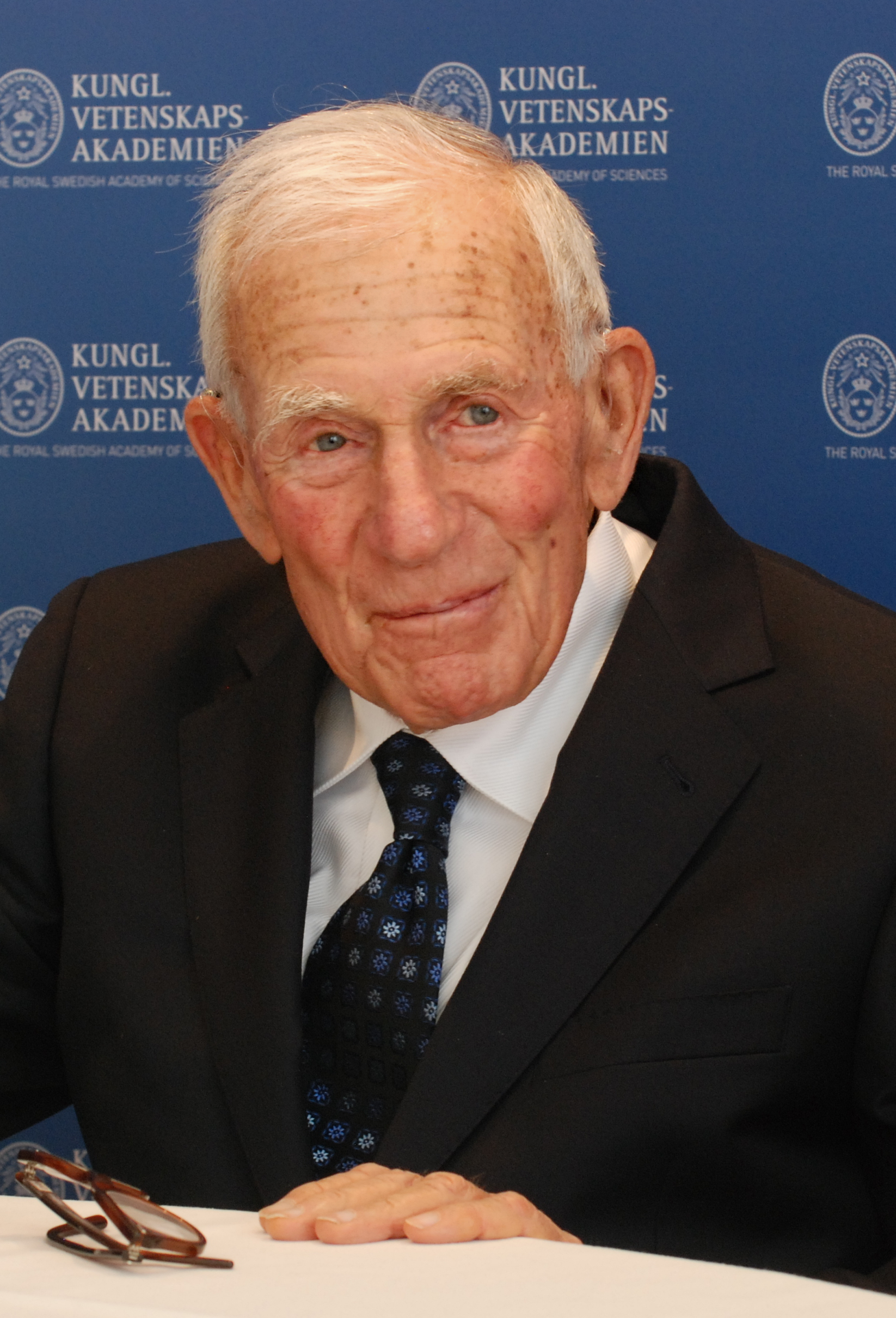
Munk in Stockholm in 2010 to accept the Crafoord Prize.

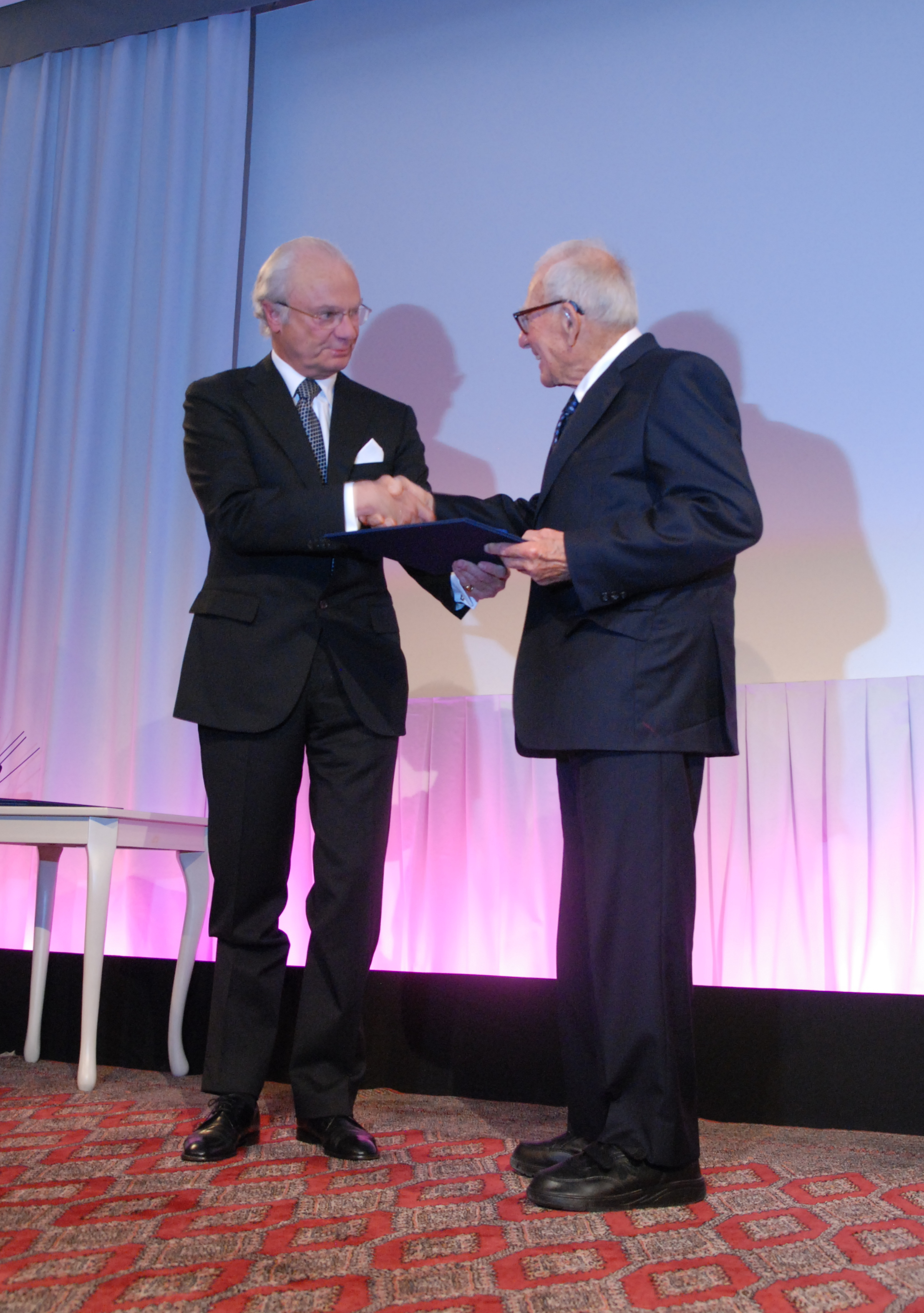
Carl XVI Gustaf of Sweden presents the Crafoord Prize to Munk.

Munk was elected to the National Academy of Sciences in 1956, the American Academy of Arts and Sciences in 1957, the American Philosophical Society in 1965, and to the Royal Society of London in 1976. He was both a Guggenheim Fellow (1948, 1953, 1962) and a Fulbright Fellow. He was named California Scientist of the Year by the California Museum of Science and Industry in 1969. Munk gave the 1986 Bakerian Lecture at the Royal Society on Ships from Space (paper) and Acoustic monitoring of ocean gyres (lecture). In July 2018 at the age of 100, Munk was appointed a Chevalier of France's Legion of Honour in recognition of his contributions to oceanography.

Among the many other awards and honors Munk received are the Golden Plate Award of the American Academy of Achievement, the Arthur L. Day Medal of the Geological Society of America in 1965, the Sverdrup Gold Medal of the American Meteorological Society in 1966, the Gold Medal of the Royal Astronomical Society in 1968, the first Maurice Ewing Medal of the American Geophysical Union and the U.S. Navy in 1976, the Alexander Agassiz Medal of the National Academy of Sciences in 1976, the Captain Robert Dexter Conrad Award of the U.S. Navy in 1978, the National Medal of Science in 1983, the William Bowie Medal of the American Geophysical Union in 1989, the Vetlesen Prize in 1993, the Kyoto Prize in 1999, the first Prince Albert I Medal in 2001, and the Crafoord Prize of the Royal Swedish Academy of Sciences in 2010 "for his pioneering and fundamental contributions to our understanding of ocean circulation, tides and waves, and their role in the Earth's dynamics".

In 1993, Munk was the first recipient of the Walter Munk Award given "in Recognition of Distinguished Research in Oceanography Related to Sound and the Sea." This award was given jointly by The Oceanography Society, the Office of Naval Research and the US Department of Defense Naval Oceanographic Office. The award was retired in 2018, and The Oceanographic Society "established the Walter Munk Medal to encompass a broader range of topics in physical oceanography."

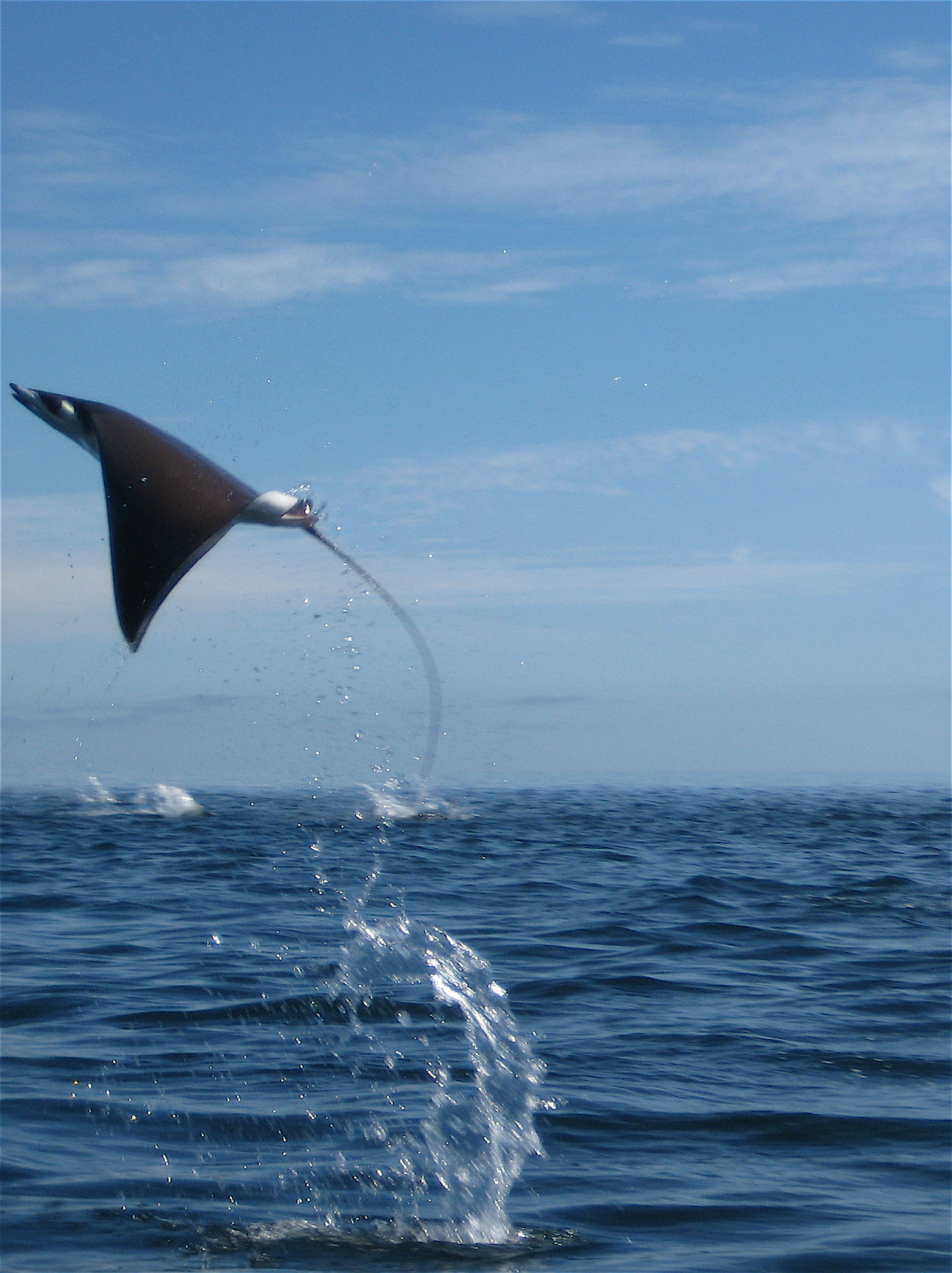
Munk's devil ray.

Two marine species have been named after Munk. One is Sirsoe munki, a deep-sea worm. The other is Mobula munkiana, also known as Munk's devil ray, a small relative of giant manta rays living in huge schools, and with a remarkable ability to leap far out of the water. A 2017 documentary, Spirit of Discovery (Documentary), follows Munk in an expedition with the discoverer, his former student Giuseppe Notarbartolo di Sciara, to Cabo Pulmo National Park in Baja Mexico, the place where the species was first found and described.

== Personal life ==
After Nazi Germany annexed Austria in 1938 during the Anschluss, Munk applied to be a citizen of the United States. In his first attempt, he failed the citizenship test by giving an overly detailed answer to a question about the Constitution. He obtained American citizenship in 1939.

Munk married Martha Chapin in the late 1940s. The marriage ended in divorce in 1953. On June 20, 1953, he married Judith Horton. She was an active participant at Scripps for decades, where she contributed to campus planning, architecture, and the renovation and reuse of historical buildings. The Munks were frequent traveling companions. Judith died in 2006. In 2011, Munk married La Jolla community leader Mary Coakley.

Munk remained actively engaged in scientific endeavors throughout his life, with publications as late as 2016. He turned 100 in October 2017. He died of pneumonia on February 8, 2019, at La Jolla, California, aged 101.

== Publications ==
=== Scientific papers ===
Munk published 181 scientific papers. They were cited over 11,000 times, an average of 63 times each. Some of the most highly cited papers in the Web of Science database are listed below.

- Munk, W. H. (1950). "On the wind-driven ocean circulation". Journal of Meteorology. 7 (2): 79–93. Bibcode:1950JAtS....7...80M. doi:10.1175/1520-0469(1950)007<0080:OTWDOC>2.0.CO;2.
- Cox, Charles; Munk, Walter (November 1, 1954). "Measurement of the Roughness of the Sea Surface from Photographs of the Sun's Glitter". Journal of the Optical Society of America. 44 (11): 838. Bibcode:1954JOSA...44..838C. doi:10.1364/JOSA.44.000838. S2CID 27889078.
- Munk, Walter H. (August 1966). "Abyssal recipes". Deep Sea Research and Oceanographic Abstracts. 13 (4): 707–730. Bibcode:1966DSRA...13..707M. doi:10.1016/0011-7471(66)90602-4.
- Munk, W. H.; Cartwright, D. E. (May 19, 1966). "Tidal Spectroscopy and Prediction". Philosophical Transactions of the Royal Society A: Mathematical, Physical and Engineering Sciences. 259 (1105): 533–581. Bibcode:1966RSPTA.259..533M. doi:10.1098/rsta.1966.0024. S2CID 122043855.
- Garrett, Christopher; Munk, Walter (January 20, 1975). "Space-time scales of internal waves: A progress report". Journal of Geophysical Research. 80 (3): 291–297. Bibcode:1975JGR....80..291G. doi:10.1029/JC080i003p00291. S2CID 54665169.
- Munk, Walter; Wunsch, Carl (February 1979). "Ocean acoustic tomography: a scheme for large scale monitoring". Deep Sea Research Part A. Oceanographic Research Papers. 26 (2): 123–161. Bibcode:1979DSRA...26..123M. doi:10.1016/0198-0149(79)90073-6.
- Garrett, C; Munk, W (January 1979). "Internal Waves in the Ocean". Annual Review of Fluid Mechanics. 11 (1): 339–369. Bibcode:1979AnRFM..11..339G. doi:10.1146/annurev.fl.11.010179.002011.
- Munk, Walter; Wunsch, Carl (December 1998). "Abyssal recipes II: energetics of tidal and wind mixing". Deep Sea Research Part I: Oceanographic Research Papers. 45 (12): 1977–2010. Bibcode:1998DSRI...45.1977M. doi:10.1016/S0967-0637(98)00070-3.

=== Books ===
- W. Munk and G.J.F. MacDonald, The Rotation of the Earth: A Geophysical Discussion, Cambridge University Press, 1960, revised 1975. ISBN 0-521-20778-9
- W. Munk, P. Worcester, and C. Wunsch, Ocean Acoustic Tomography, Cambridge University Press, 1995. ISBN 0-521-47095-1
- S. Flatté (ed.), R. Dashen, W. H. Munk, K. M. Watson, and F. Zachariasen, Sound Transmission through a Fluctuating Ocean, Cambridge University Press, 1979. ISBN 978-0-521-21940-2; Dashen, Roger; Munk, Walter H.; Watson, Kenneth M. (June 10, 2010). 2010 pbk reprint. Cambridge University Press. ISBN 978-0-521-14245-8.
