= Gold Medal of the Royal Astronomical Society =

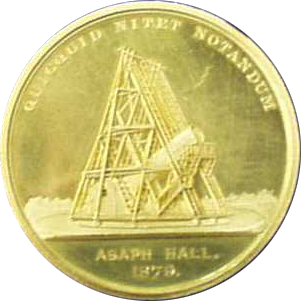
- The RAS gold medal awarded to Asaph Hall in 1879
- Awarded for: Achievement in astronomy or geophysics
- Country: United Kingdom
- Reward: Medal
- First award: 1824
- 2026 winners: Shrinivas Kulkarni & Andrew Jackson
- Website: https://ras.ac.uk/awards-and-grants/awards

The Gold Medal of the Royal Astronomical Society is the highest award given by the Royal Astronomical Society (RAS). It usually recognises lifetime achievement in the fields supported by the RAS, but has occasionally been given for an individual discovery.

Two medals are awarded per year, one in astronomy (including astrophysics, cosmology etc.) and one in geophysics (including planetary science, tectonics etc.) The medal features an image of the 40-foot telescope constructed by Sir William Herschel, the first President of the RAS. All recipients are listed below.

== Criteria ==
The RAS Council have "complete freedom as to the grounds on which it is awarded" so it can be awarded for any reason. Past awards have been given for "outstanding personal researches in the fields of astronomy and geophysics" as well as general contributions to astronomy and geophysics "that may be made through leadership in research programmes, through education and through scientific administration". It has most frequently been awarded for extraordinary lifetime achievement, but occasionally for specific pieces of research.

== History ==
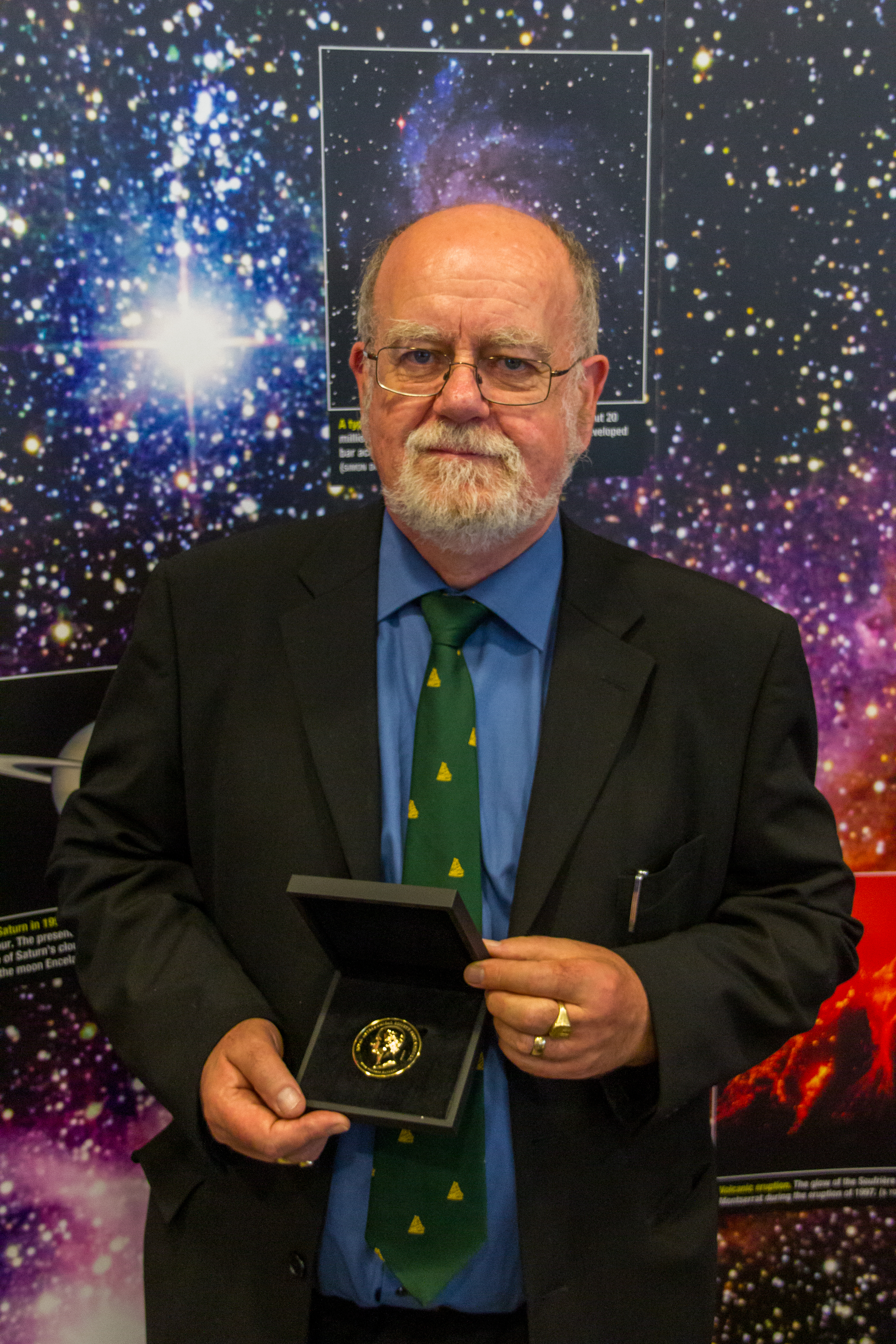
John Campbell Brown with his gold medal, awarded in 2012

The RAS was founded in 1820 and the first Gold Medals were awarded in 1824. Silver medals were also awarded in 1824 and 1827, but that practice was quickly abandoned, instead the RAS established other awards.

In the early years, the RAS Council sometimes decided that there were no suitable nominations that merited the award of the gold medal. There are therefore 17 years without an award, the most recent being 1942 - on that occasion due to the disruption of the Second World War. In the early years, more than one medal was often awarded in a year, but by 1833 only one medal was being awarded per year. This remained the usual practice for over a century, although two medals were awarded in both 1867 and 1886. To ensure balance in research areas, in 1964 the award was expanded to two medals per year, one in astronomy (including astrophysics, cosmology etc.) and one in geophysics (including planetary science, tectonics etc.), which remains the current system.

The first woman to receive the Gold Medal was Caroline Herschel in 1828. No other woman received the award until Vera Rubin in 1996. Margaret and Geoffrey Burbidge were jointly awarded the 2005 Gold Medal in astronomy, the first joint award since 1886.

=== Discovery of Neptune ===
From 1833 the RAS only awarded one medal per year, which was enforced by a bye-law. This caused a controversy when Neptune was discovered in 1846. The astronomers Urbain Le Verrier and John Couch Adams had both independently predicted the existence of the planet and calculated its possible positions. The actual observation was by Johann Gottfried Galle, who was working from Le Verrier's prediction.

Le Verrier, Adams and Galle were all nominated for the RAS gold medal by the deadline in November 1846. At that time, Le Verrier was the only one to have formally published his results, so he was selected as the strongest nominee. Adams publicly acknowledged that Le Verrier had priority. However, by the time of the confirmatory vote in January 1847, Adams' publication had also been communicated to the council. Many members felt that the award should be made jointly to both Adams and Le Verrier, but this was prohibited by the bye-law. The Council did not reach the required 3:1 super-majority to confirm Le Verrier's medal, so none was awarded in 1847.

A special general meeting of the fellows was called to consider suspending the bye-law, but declined to do so. By the following nomination deadline, both Le Verrier and Adams had been nominated again, and there was still no way to honour both without violating the bye-law. The controversy was resolved by giving 12 "testimonial" awards (not gold medals) in 1848 to everyone who had been nominated, which included Adams, Le Verrier, several members of the council, and two previous winners of the gold medal. Galle was not included, and never received an award from the RAS. Seventy years later, Ralph Allan Sampson described this fudged decision as "prematurely awarding some and unnecessarily rewarding others ... offending against good taste ... and depleting future years of many of their best candidates".

Gold medal awards resumed in 1849, with the limit of one per year. Adams and Le Verrier were not given gold medals until 1866 and 1868, respectively, officially for work unrelated to the discovery of Neptune. Adams, who was then President of the RAS, presented Le Verrier with the medal.

=== General relativity ===
In 1919, Arthur Eddington led an expedition to observe the solar eclipse on 29 May. The photographs taken during that event confirmed Albert Einstein's general theory of relativity; Eddington presented his results at a special joint meeting of the RAS and the Royal Society in November 1919. The RAS also devoted their December 1919 meeting to discussion of general relativity. Einstein immediately became the leading candidate for the 1920 RAS Gold Medal.

At that time, RAS Council selected the strongest nominations at its December meeting, which required a simple majority vote. A second vote would then be held in January to confirm that the medal should be awarded, which required a three-quarters super-majority; normally this was a formality. Einstein was nominated by H. H. Turner, seconded by James Jeans, and at the December meeting Council voted that Einstein was the strongest candidate. However, some members of Council felt it would be politically inappropriate to award the medal to a German citizen (Einstein then held German and Swiss joint citizenship), because Britain was still technically engaged in the First World War against Germany (the Treaty of Versailles did not enter into force until 10 January 1920). At the January meeting, Council did not confirm the award. Turner and Jeans were both Council members and had been present at the December meeting, but not in January; their absence may have swayed the outcome.

As a result, no gold medal was awarded in 1920. Embarrassingly, after the December vote Eddington had already passed a message to Einstein, stating that he would receive the medal. Eddington had to write an apologetic letter to Einstein informing him that the medal had been withdrawn. Einstein was again nominated for the 1921 medal, but Council decided that the issue was still too controversial so awarded the medal to Henry Norris Russell instead. Einstein does not appear to have been too offended by the affair, because he attended the June 1921 meeting of the RAS where he delivered a lecture on general relativity. He did not receive his gold medal until 1926, when the political situation had stabilised and the composition of Council had changed. Eddington received his own gold medal in 1924, before Einstein, in part for his work in confirming general relativity.

== Recipients ==
Year	Astronomy	Geophysics	Notes	References
1824	Charles Babbage; Johann Franz Encke		(Note: Silver medalists: Jean-Louis Pons, Charles Rümker)	
1825	No award			
1826	John Herschel; James South; Wilhelm Struve			
1827	Francis Baily		(Note: Silver medalists: Mark Beaufoy, William Samuel Stratford)	
1828	Thomas Makdougall Brisbane; James Dunlop; Caroline Herschel		(Note: The first woman to receive the Gold Medal was Caroline Herschel in 1828. No other woman did so until Vera Rubin in 1996.)	
1829	Friedrich Wilhelm Bessel; William Pearson; Heinrich Christian Schumacher			
1830	Johann Franz Encke; William Richardson			
1831	Marie-Charles Damoiseau; Henry Kater			
1832	No award			
1833	George Biddell Airy			
1834	No award			
1835	Manuel John Johnson			
1836	John Herschel			
1837	Otto August Rosenberger			
1838	No award			
1839	John Wrottesley			
1840	Jean Plana			
1841	Friedrich Wilhelm Bessel			
1842	Peter Andreas Hansen			
1843	Francis Baily			
1844	No award			
1845	William Henry Smyth			
1846	George Biddell Airy			
1847	No award		see § Discovery of Neptune	
1848	No award		(Note: Replaced by testimonial medals, awarded to John Couch Adams, George Biddell Airy, Friedrich Wilhelm Argelander, George Bishop, George Everest, Peter Andreas Hansen, Karl Ludwig Hencke, John Herschel, John Russell Hind, John William Lubbock, Urbain Le Verrier & Maxmilian Weisse)	
1849	William Lassell			
1850	Otto Wilhelm von Struve			
1851	Annibale de Gasparis			
1852	Christian August Friedrich Peters			
1853	John Russell Hind			
1854	Charles Rümker			
1855	William Rutter Dawes			
1856	Robert Grant			
1857	Heinrich Schwabe			
1858	Robert Main			
1859	Richard Christopher Carrington			
1860	Peter Andreas Hansen			
1861	Hermann Goldschmidt			
1862	Warren de la Rue			
1863	Friedrich Wilhelm Argelander			
1864	No award			
1865	George Phillips Bond			
1866	John Couch Adams			
1867	William Huggins; William Allen Miller			
1868	Urbain Le Verrier			
1869	Edward James Stone			
1870	Charles-Eugène Delaunay			
1871	No award			
1872	Giovanni Schiaparelli			
1873	No award			
1874	Simon Newcomb			
1875	Heinrich d'Arrest			
1876	Urbain Le Verrier			
1877	No award			
1878	Ercole Dembowski			
1879	Asaph Hall			
1880	No award			
1881	Axel Möller			
1882	David Gill			
1883	Benjamin Apthorp Gould			
1884	Andrew Ainslie Common			
1885	William Huggins			
1886	Edward Charles Pickering; Charles Pritchard			
1887	George William Hill			
1888	Arthur Auwers			
1889	Maurice Loewy			
1890	No award			
1891	No award			
1892	George Howard Darwin			
1893	Hermann Carl Vogel			
1894	Sherburne Wesley Burnham			
1895	Isaac Roberts			
1896	Seth Carlo Chandler			
1897	E. E. Barnard			
1898	William Frederick Denning			
1899	Frank McClean			
1900	Henri Poincaré			
1901	Edward Charles Pickering			
1902	Jacobus Kapteyn			
1903		Hermann Struve		
1904		George Ellery Hale		
1905	Lewis Boss			
1906	William Wallace Campbell			
1907		Ernest William Brown		
1908		David Gill		
1909	Oskar Backlund			
1910		Friedrich Küstner		
1911	Philip Herbert Cowell			
1912	Arthur Robert Hinks			
1913		Henri-Alexandre Deslandres		
1914	Max Wolf			
1915		Alfred Fowler		
1916	John Louis Emil Dreyer			
1917	Walter Sydney Adams			
1918		John Evershed		
1919	Guillaume Bigourdan			
1920	No award		see § General relativity	
1921	Henry Norris Russell			
1922	James Jeans			
1923	Albert A. Michelson			
1924	Arthur Eddington			
1925		Frank Watson Dyson		
1926	Albert Einstein			
1927	Frank Schlesinger			
1928		Ralph Allen Sampson		
1929	Ejnar Hertzsprung			
1930	John Stanley Plaskett			
1931	Willem de Sitter			
1932	Robert Grant Aitken			
1933	Vesto Slipher			
1934	Harlow Shapley			
1935	Edward Arthur Milne			
1936		Hisashi Kimura		
1937		Harold Jeffreys		
1938	William Hammond Wright			
1939		Bernard Lyot		
1940	Edwin Hubble			
1941	No award			
1942	No award			
1943		Harold Spencer Jones		
1944	Otto Struve			
1945		Bengt Edlén		
1946	Jan Oort			
1947		Marcel Minnaert		
1948	Bertil Lindblad			
1949		Sydney Chapman		
1950	Joel Stebbins			
1951	Anton Pannekoek			
1952	John Jackson			
1953	Subrahmanyan Chandrasekhar			
1954	Walter Baade			
1955	Dirk Brouwer			
1956		Thomas George Cowling		
1957	Albrecht Unsöld			
1958		André Danjon		
1959	Raymond Arthur Lyttleton			
1960	Viktor Ambartsumian			
1961	Herman Zanstra			
1962	Bengt Strömgren			
1963		Harry Hemley Plaskett		
1964	Martin Ryle	Maurice Ewing		
1965	Gerald Maurice Clemence	Edward Bullard		
1966	Ira Sprague Bowen	Harold Clayton Urey		
1967	Allan Sandage	Hannes Alfvén		
1968	Fred Hoyle	Walter Munk		
1969	Martin Schwarzschild	Albert Thomas Price		
1970	Horace W. Babcock			
1971	Richard van der Riet Woolley	Frank Press		
1972	Fritz Zwicky	Hal Thirlaway		
1973	Edwin Salpeter	Francis Birch		
1974	Ludwig Biermann	Keith Bullen		
1975	Jesse Greenstein	Ernst Öpik		
1976	William McCrea	J. A. Ratcliffe		
1977	John Bolton	David Bates		
1978	Lyman Spitzer	James Van Allen		
1979	Charles Gorrie Wynne	Leon Knopoff		
1980	Maarten Schmidt	Chaim L. Pekeris		
1981	Bernard Lovell	James Freeman Gilbert		
1982	Riccardo Giacconi	Harrie Massey		
1983	M. J. Seaton	Fred Whipple		
1984	Yakov Borisovich Zel'dovich	Keith Runcorn		
1985	Stephen Hawking	Thomas Gold		
1986	Alexander Dalgarno	George E. Backus		
1987	Martin Rees	Takesi Nagata		
1988	Cornelis de Jager	Don L. Anderson		
1989	Ken Pounds	Raymond Hide		
1990	Bernard Pagel	James Dungey		
1991	Vitaly Ginzburg	Gerald J. Wasserburg		
1992	Eugene Parker	Dan McKenzie		
1993	Donald Lynden-Bell	Peter Goldreich		
1994	James Gunn	Thomas Reeve Kaiser		
1995	Rashid Sunyaev	John Houghton		
1996	Vera Rubin	Kenneth Creer		
1997	Donald Osterbrock	Donald Farley		
1998	Jim Peebles	Robert L. Parker		
1999	Bohdan Paczyński	Kenneth Budden		
2000	Leon Lucy	Robert Hutchison		
2001	Hermann Bondi	Henry Rishbeth		
2002	Leon Mestel	John Arthur Jacobs		
2003	John Bahcall	David Gubbins		
2004	Jerry Ostriker	Grenville Turner		
2005	Margaret Burbidge; Geoffrey Burbidge	Carole Jordan	(Note: Margaret and Geoffrey Burbidge received the first joint award since 1886)	
2006	Simon White	Stan Cowley		
2007	Leonard Culhane	Nigel Weiss		
2008	Joseph Silk	Brian Kennett		
2009	David Williams	Eric Priest		
2010	Douglas Gough	John Woodhouse		
2011	Richard Ellis	Eberhard Grün		
2012	Andy Fabian	John Brown		
2013	Roger Blandford	Chris Chapman		
2014	Carlos Frenk	John Zarnecki		
2015	Michel Mayor	Mike Lockwood		
2016	John Barrow	Philip England		
2017	Nick Kaiser	Michele Dougherty		
2018	Jim Hough	Bob White		
2019	Robert Kennicutt	Margaret Kivelson		
2020	Sandra Faber	Yvonne Elsworth		
2021	Jocelyn Bell Burnell	Thorne Lay		
2022	George Efstathiou	Richard B. Horne		
2023	John Peacock	Tim Palmer		
2024	Gilles Chabrier	John-Michael Kendall		
2025	James Binney	Jonathan Tennyson		
2026	Shrinivas Kulkarni	Andrew Jackson		

== See also ==
- List of astronomy awards
- List of geophysics awards
