= Leonard Culhane =

British astronomer

Leonard John Celistus Culhane (otherwise known as J. Leonard Culhane) FRS (born 14 October 1937) is an Irish-born British astronomer, former director of the Mullard Space Science Laboratory at University College London.

== Career ==
He commenced his academic career as a lecturer at University College, London (1967–1976) with a short break as a researcher in Lockheed Palo Alto Laboratory, California in 1969, rising to be Reader in Physics from 1976 to 1981 and professor of physics from 1981 to 2006. During that time he was deputy director and then director of the Mullard Space Science Laboratory (1981–2003). On his retirement in 2006 he became emeritus professor of physics.

His interests lay in the fields of space instrumentation, solar physics, X-ray astronomy and EUV/X-ray spectroscopy.

He was chairman of the European Space Sciences Committee from 1998 to 2002.

== Honors and awards ==
- 1970: elected member of the International Astronomical Union
- 1985: elected fellow, Royal Society of London
- 1991-1994: vice-president, European Space Agency Science Programme Committee
- 1991: elected full member of the International Academy of Astronautics
- 1993: awarded honorary doctorate of science, University of Wroclaw
- 1996: elected foreign member of the Norwegian Academy of Science and Letters
- 2001: elected member Academia Europaea
- 2005: Royal Aeronautical Society, Specialist Silver Award and Geoffrey Pardoe Space Prize
- 2007: Awarded Gold Medal of the Royal Astronomical Society in astronomy
- 2008: Elected Fellow of University College London

== Works ==
- J. Leonard Culhane, Peter W. Sanford, X-ray astronomy, Faber, 1981, ISBN 978-0-571-11550-1
- J. Leonard Culhane, Eijirō Hiei (eds) Solar flare, coronal, and heliospheric dynamics, Pergamon, 1995
- J. Leonard Culhane, Robert D. Bentley, John Gerard Doyle, R. Jeffrey Wilkes (eds), The sun and similar stars cosmic ray spectra and composition, Pergamon, 2001
