= Richard B. Horne =

British researcher

Richard B. Horne FRS
- Education: University of Sheffield; University of Sussex
- Scientific career
- Institutions: Rutherford Appleton Laboratory; British Antarctic Survey; University of Sheffield

Richard B. Horne is a British scientist who specialises in space weather, ionospheric physics and plasma physics. He has served as the head of space weather at the British Antarctic Survey. Horne has been a Fellow of the Royal Society since 2021, and was awarded the Gold Medal of the Royal Astronomical Society in 2022.

== Early life and education ==
Horne received his first degree in Physics from the University of Sheffield from 1974 to 1977 before completing a PhD at the University of Sussex from 1977, completing in 1980 or 1982.

== Research ==
Horne joined the Rutherford Appleton Laboratory in 1981 as a Higher Scientific Officer before moving to the British Antarctic Survey in 1984.

Horne received recognition for his work on wave-particle interactions in space. In particular, Horne showed how plasma waves had the capability to accelerate charged particles to relativistic speeds, and that these particles had an effect on the formation of the radiation belts. In 2005, he received awards from NASA and ESA for his work showing that very low frequency plasma waves are a major cause of the Van Allen belts, which was validated with the 2012 launch of the Van Allen Probes.

From 2011 to 2017, Horne led two collaborations- SPACECAST and SPACESTORM- to successfully produce operational forecasts of space weather impacts on satellites, which are now used by the European Space Agency and other clients. Horne's contribution to the SPACESTORM collaboration led directly to significantly higher risk estimates of the risk of space weather to satellites, and led to revised assessments of space weather on the National Risk Register in 2017 and 2020.

== Leadership roles ==
Horne was vice-president of the Royal Astronomical Society from 1997 to 1999 and the chair of Commission H at the International Union of Radio Science from 2005 to 2008. He led the SPACECAST and SPACESTORM European collaboration projects from 2011 to 2014 and from 2014 to 2017 respectively. He has been the chair of the Space Environment Impacts Expert Group, which directly advises the UK Cabinet Office on space weather hazards. He has been a member of the executive team at the British Antarctic Survey since 2014.

== Awards ==
Horne became a fellow of the Royal Astronomical Society in 1981, a fellow of the American Geophysical Union in 2011, and a fellow of the International Union of Radio Science in 2017 before becoming a fellow of the Royal Society in 2021. He was appointed a fellow at St Edmund's College, Cambridge in 2014 and Honorary fellow in 2023. Horne has been a member of the Academia Europaea since 2023.

Horne was appointed an honorary professor at the University of Sheffield in 2009. He was the recipient of a Doctor of Science from the University of Cambridge in 2020.

Horne received a NASA Group Achievement Award in 2005 for contributions to Cluster’s exploration of Geospace, and awards from the European Space Agency related to the Cluster mission in 2005 and 2016. Horne was the runner up to the Science of Risk prize from Lloyd's of London in 2014, and both the Kristian Birkeland medal and URSI Appleton prize in 2020. In 2022, he won the Gold Medal of the Royal Astronomical Society for Geophysics.
