= Hal Thirlaway =

Henry Ivison Shipley Thirlaway (9 August 1917 – 30 November 2009) was a British seismologist. He did extensive work on the monitoring of underground nuclear testing. He was awarded the Gold Medal of the Royal Astronomical Society in 1972.
