= Deep (company) =

British ocean engineering company

DEEP
- Type: Private
- Industry: Ocean engineering
- Founded: 2021; 5 years ago
- Headquarters: United Kingdom
- Key people: Kristen Tertoole (COO); Norman Smith (CTO)
- Website: deep.com

Deep (stylized all caps as DEEP) is an ocean engineering company that develops subsea human habitats. Founded in 2021, its dive training center is located at the former National Diving and Activity Centre near Tidenham and it has an engineering hub located in Florida. It has developed two habitat systems, Vanguard and Sentinel, and also owns R/P FLIP.

== History ==
DEEP was founded in 2021 in the United Kingdom. It spent two years in stealth while developing its technology, during which time it acquired the former National Diving and Activity Centre (NDAC), a flooded limestone quarry near Tidenham. DEEP repurposed the location for development and training purposes. It renamed the site DEEP Campus, centered on an 80-metre-deep flooded quarry. The site includes dive training facilities. The DEEP Manufacturing arm of the company operates out of an industrial facility in Bristol.

In September 2023, DEEP announced its Sentinel subsea habitat program, with the goal of it being fully habitable by 2027. The following year, it acquired R/P FLIP (Floating Instrument Platform), a research vessel previously operated by the Scripps Institution of Oceanography.

In October 2025, DEEP unveiled Vanguard, a pilot subsea habitat, in Miami. It was described as the first purpose-built subsea habitat since the Aquarius Reef Base, which was installed in the 1980s. According to DEEP, Vanguard will be the first subsea habitat to receive classification from DNV, an international certification body for marine technology.

== Projects ==
DEEP develops subsea habitats designed to allow crews to live and work on the seabed for extended periods. The company has described this approach as an alternative to conventional ocean research methods. Its habitats have been referred to as an International Space Station for the ocean.

=== Vanguard ===
Vanguard is DEEP's pilot subsea habitat. It accommodates a crew of four for missions of seven or more days at a maximum operational depth of 50 meters. The habitat is approximately 12 meterslong and operates at ambient pressure. It consists of three main sections: living quarters with foldable bunks, a dive center containing a moon pool that allows crew to enter and exit the water, and a seabed foundation base. A surface support buoy, tethered to the habitat, supplies compressed air, fresh water, electrical power, and communications. The habitat carries 72 hours of emergency life-support reserves.

=== Sentinel ===
Sentinel is DEEP's larger modular habitat system. Individual Sentinel modules are designed to accommodate crews of six, with multiple modules connected in various configurations to support more people. It operates at depths of up to 200 meters in the epipelagic zone, the deepest ocean layer reached by sunlight. Crew stays are planned for up to 28 days per mission.

Sentinel's modules allow configurations to be adjusted for different research or operational requirements.
