= Judith Munk =

American politician

- Born: April 10, 1925; San Gabriel, California, United States
- Died: May 19, 2006 (aged 81)
- Education: Bennington College
- Occupation: Artist
- Employer: Scripps Institution of Oceanography

Judith Munk (April 10, 1925 – May 19, 2006) was an American artist and designer associated with Scripps Institution of Oceanography. She was inducted into the San Diego Women's Hall of Fame posthumously, in 2008.

== Early life and education ==
Judith Kendall Horton was born in 1925, in San Gabriel, California. Her parents were Winter Davis Horton and Edith Kendall Horton. The actor Edward Everett Horton was her uncle.

Horton attended Bennington College and earned degrees in art and architecture, with Richard Neutra as a mentor. She had just begun graduate studies at Harvard University School of Design when she became ill with poliomyelitis, and left to recover at the home of her maternal grandmother in San Diego. She studied with sculptor Donal Hord instead of returning to Harvard. She used a wheelchair for much of her adult life.

== Career ==
Judith Horton worked as an illustrator and model builder at the Scripps Aquarium as a young woman. After marriage, she worked mainly in sculpture and architectural design in the nearby community. She worked on several buildings on the campus of Scripps, including The Institute of Geophysics and Planetary Physics (IGPP, a 1962 building of redwood and glass, overlooking the ocean from cliffs), Scripps Seaside Forum, and the Scripps Crossing, a cable footbridge linking two parts of campus. She was also active in the restoration of the 1913 "Director's House." She was responsible for bringing a Donal Hord statue to campus, now located outside the Munk Laboratory.

Working with her husband, she traveled to Italy, China, the Soviet Union, and American Samoa. During 1963 she and Walter lived at the village of Vailoatai on Tutuila in American Samoa. They were both working on a documentary film, Waves Across the Pacific (1967). She co-founded the International Center to host guests at the University of California at San Diego.

Horton also served on the La Jolla Town Council. She won a grant from the National Endowment for the Arts to design an amphitheater for the town, but the project failed. She was an honorary member of the San Diego chapter of the American Institute of Architects.

== Personal life ==
Judith Horton married oceanographer Walter Munk as his second wife, in 1953, and had three daughters, Lucian, Kendall and Edie. The Munks designed their home in La Jolla, "Seiche," and frequently hosted campus social gatherings there. Judith died in 2006, age 81, from pneumonia. In 2008, she was posthumously inducted into the San Diego Women's Hall of Fame.

The IGPP laboratory Munk helped to design was renamed for Walter and Judith Munk in 1993.
