= Axel Möller =

Swedish astronomer

Didrik Magnus Axel Möller
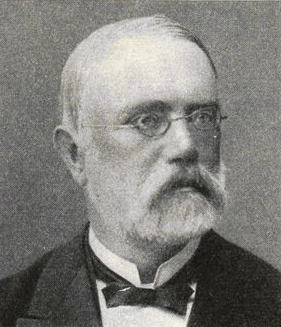
- Born: 16 February 1830
- Died: 25 October 1896 (aged 66)
- Occupation: Astronomer

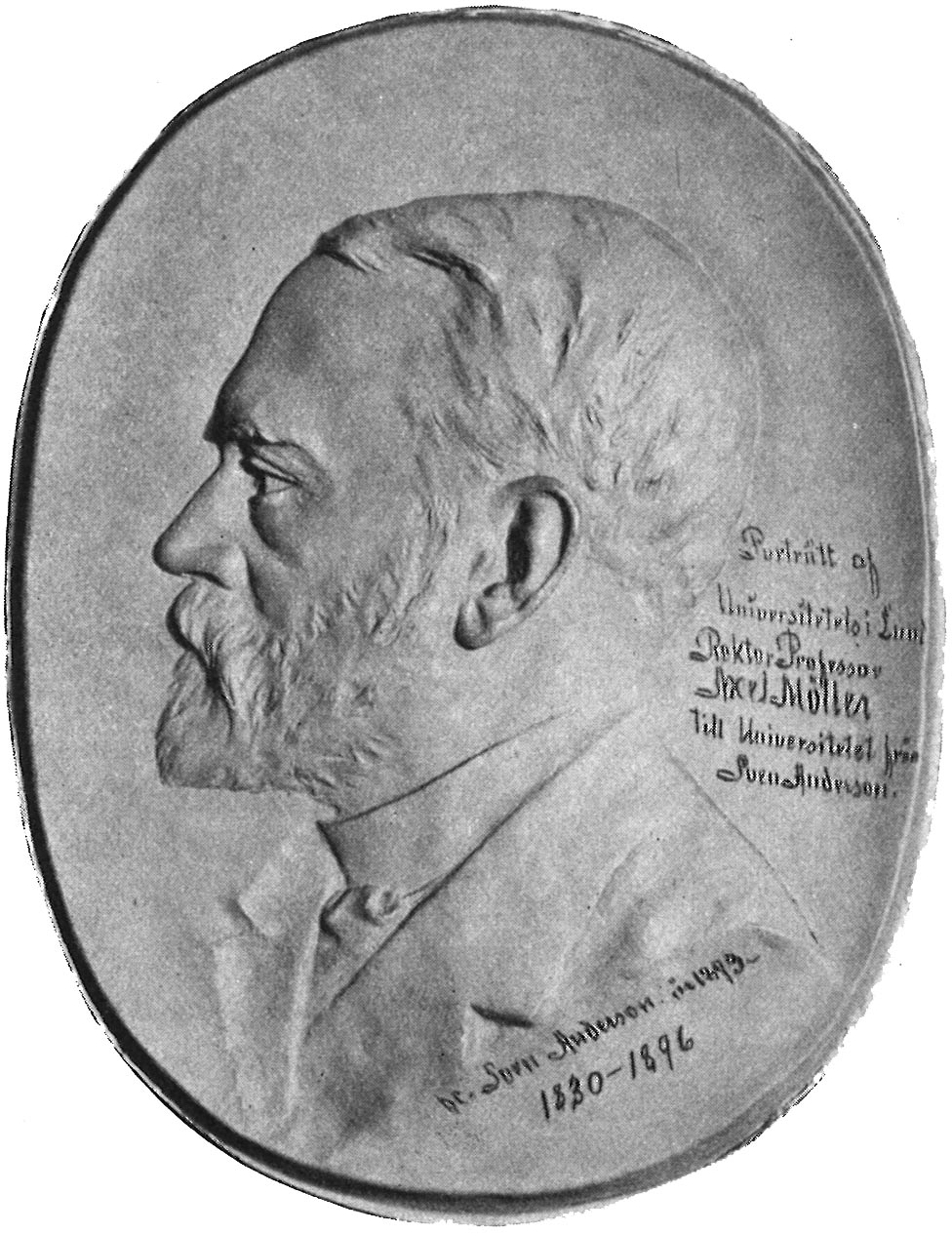
Sculpture of Möller by Sven Anderson (1846-1820) in 1893.

Didrik Magnus Axel Möller (16 February 1830 – 25 October 1896) was a Swedish astronomer.

He matriculated as a student at Lund University in 1846, received his Ph.D. in 1853 and was Professor of Astronomy there from 1863 until 1895.

He calculated the orbits of comets and asteroids. He notably calculated the orbit of the periodic comet 4P/Faye, as well as the perturbations of the asteroid 55 Pandora.

He was elected a member of the Royal Swedish Academy of Sciences in 1869 and won the Gold Medal of the Royal Astronomical Society in 1881.
