= Tom Kaiser =

Australian researcher

Thomas Reeve Kaiser
- Born: 2 May 1924; Ivanhoe, Melbourne, Australia
- Died: 2 July 1998 (age 74); Palma de Majorca, Spain
- Education: University of Melbourne; University of Oxford
- Spouse: Pamela Pound
- Children: 3 (including Nick Kaiser)
- Scientific career
- Institutions: CSIRO; University of Melbourne; University of Oxford; University of Manchester; University of Reading; University of Sheffield
- Thesis: On the Capture of Particles into Synchrotron Orbits (1949)
- Doctoral advisor: Frederick Lindemann

Thomas Reeve Kaiser (2 May 1924 – 2 July 1998) was an Australian physicist and geophysicist. He was awarded the Gold Medal of the Royal Astronomical Society in 1994, and was a known communist during the Cold War.

== Biography ==
=== Early life and education ===
Born in Ivanhoe, Victoria, Kaiser came from the working class. His father was a factory worker, and many in his family worked in the mining industry. He received his bachelor's degree in 1943 and his master's degree in 1946 from the University of Melbourne. He received his master's degree whilst working for CSIRO at the Sydney Radiophysics Laboratory, having started working for CSIRO in 1944. During the Second World War, Kaiser participated in radar research. In 1947, Kaiser attended University College, Oxford to study nuclear physics, mostly working at the Clarendon Laboratory. He completed his Doctorate on the acceleration of charged particles in two years. His dissertation was entitled On the Capture of Particles into Synchrotron Orbits, and he was advised by Frederick Lindemann. During his time at Oxford, Kaiser helped construct the 16MeV Betatron and conducted experiments using the equipment.

=== Early career and political activity ===
Kaiser's scholarship at the University of Oxford was withdrawn in 1949 during McCarthyism due to Kaiser's communist beliefs, forcing Kaiser to return to Australia with his British wife Pamela (also a member of the Communist party), who he had married earlier that same year. This was a result of Kaiser's participation in a demonstration outside Australia House against the Australian government's treatment of coal miners during the 1949 Australian coal strike, which became an incident named "the Kaiser affair". Following the demonstration, on 19 August 1949 Kaiser was ordered to return to Australia by Ian Clunies Ross (head of CSIRO) and was banned from research positions in nuclear or radio physics. Kaiser was dismissed from his paid role at CSIRO after Kaiser refused to immediately return to Australia. Kaiser departed for Australia on 24 November 1949. The affair received significant coverage in Australian printed media.

Following his forced return to Australia, and his inability to gain employment, Kaiser engaged extensively in political work for the Communist Party of Australia, being under constant surveillance. By 1950, Kaiser's continued political activities meant it was necessary for him to leave Australia. He departed for England on 30 July 1950. Kaiser returned to the United Kingdom to take up a post at the University of Manchester, working under professor Patrick Blackett at Jodrell Bank. Whilst present at Jodrell bank, Kaiser became interested in the radio signal produced when interstellar dust interacts with the Earth's atmosphere and leaves ionized residue. He would go on to be an important figure in the study of meteor interactions with the upper atmosphere, in particular with his 1953 paper on the cross section and radio echos of meteors interacting with the upper atmosphere, which has been called the definitive work on the subject.

In the early 1950s, Kaiser joined the Communist Party of Great Britain and remained politically active. In 1952, he sent a telegram to President Truman on behalf of Julius and Ethel Rosenberg. The telegram was addressed from Jodrell Bank, leading to Bernard Lovell being alerted of his membership of the Communist party; eventually this would lead to Kaiser leaving Jodrell Bank. In 1954, Kaiser was named during the Petrov Affair as a person of interest to Soviet intelligence agencies.

In 1955, Kaiser joined the University of Reading as a senior lecturer. In 1956, Kaiser left the Communist party in protest at the Soviet response to the Hungarian Revolution of 1956.

Through the 1950s, Kaiser applied to at least 40 scientific positions in Australia and New Zealand, but was consistently rejected.

=== Later career ===
In 1956 he became a Senior Lecturer at the University of Sheffield, and founded the Space Physics group. In 1966 he was appointed to the chair of space physics and in 1987 he became emeritus. Despite becoming less politically active, Kaiser was still restricted from entering the United States for much of his career. As late as 1972, Kaiser was still refused a visa to enter the United States to see the launch of a satellite he helped design. He still remained a socialist, and advocated against the Vietnam War and for nuclear disarmament.

Kaiser played a part in the design of equipment on board both Ariel 3 and Ariel 4, contributing to the VLF equipment on the satellites, and assisted in their operation from ground level. Kaiser was among the first to understand the potential role of Antarctic observations for Space Physics, and participated in physics research at Halley Station, mostly contributing to setting up permanent VLF receivers. At the University of Sheffield, Kaiser set up a radar observatory to obtain radar measurements of the upper atmosphere on a local hillside (Onesmoor, near High Bradfield). Kaiser's other research interests included radar studies of the aurora and Whistler wave studies.

Kaiser retired in 1987, and suffered from poor health in later years. In 1994 he received the Gold Medal of the Royal Astronomical Society in geophysics for "his fundamental work and leadership in Space Geophysics."

On 2 July 1998, Kaiser died in Palma de Majorca, Spain.

== Personal life ==
Kaiser is the father of Nick Kaiser, who has also been awarded the Gold Medal of the Royal Astronomical Society.
