= June Pattullo =

American oceanographer (1921–1972)

June Grace Pattullo
- Born: June 30, 1921; Newark, New Jersey
- Died: January 8, 1972 (aged 50)
- Occupation: Oceanographer

June Pattullo (June 30, 1921 – January 8, 1972) was an American oceanographer. She was the first woman to receive a PhD in physical oceanography. She was considered the "world authority" on sea levels and their dependence on heating and cooling of the ocean.

== Early life and education ==
Pattullo was born in Newark, New Jersey on June 30, 1921. She served as a U.S. Marine in World Ward II. She earned her B.S. from the University of Chicago in 1948, and went to the University of California to study and work at the Scripps Institution of Oceanography, completing her M.S. in 1950. She received her PhD in 1957 from the same institution; her focus was studies of global sea level under Professor Walter Munk.

== Academic career ==
=== Oregon State University ===
In 1965, Pattullo, along with two graduate students, made the first direct measurements of currents over the continental shelf using moored current meters.

== Legacy ==
=== Pattullo Conference ===
The annual international Pattullo Conference is the centerpiece of the "Mentoring Physical Oceanography Women to Increase Retention" (MPOWIR) program. The goals of the conference are to: bring early career participants and senior scientists together to share experiences, advice and concerns; to build community networks with peers and senior scientists, to get feedback on current research; to raise awareness of issues confronting early career participants among the senior scientist community. The first Pattullo Conference was held in May, 2008, in Charleston, South Carolina, USA.

=== The Pattullo Award for Excellence in Teaching at Oregon State University ===
Professor June Pattullo played an instrumental role in the inception and early development of graduate education in oceanography at OSU. This award is named in her honor and was first given in 1998.
