= Andrew Jackson (geophysicist) =

- Occupation: Geophysicist; professor
- Awards: Gold Medal of the Royal Astronomical Society (2026)
- Website: eaps.ethz.ch/en/people/profile.andrew-jackson.html
- Academic career
- Institutions: ETH Zurich

Andrew Jackson is a professor of Earth and Planetary Magnetism at ETH Zurich. He received a gold medal of the Royal Astronomical Society in 2026 for his model that has been used by "virtually every study of the historical magnetic field of the last 20 years". He is a fellow of the Royal Society.
