= Karl Friedrich Küstner =

German astronomer

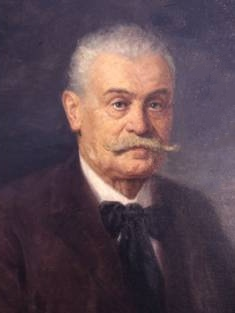
Karl Friedrich Küstner in 1931

Karl Friedrich Küstner (born in Görlitz on 22 August 1856, died 15 October 1936) was a German astronomer who also made contributions to Geodesy. In 1888, he reportedly discovered the Polar motion of the Earth. In 1910, he received the Gold Medal of the Royal Astronomical Society for cataloguing stars and detecting latitude variation.

He received his PhD from the University of Strasbourg in 1879 under Friedrich August Theodor Winnecke.

Küstner at the 1910 Fourth Conference International Union for Cooperation in Solar Research at Mount Wilson Observatory
