= Spar buoy =

Buoy designed for minimal interference from waves

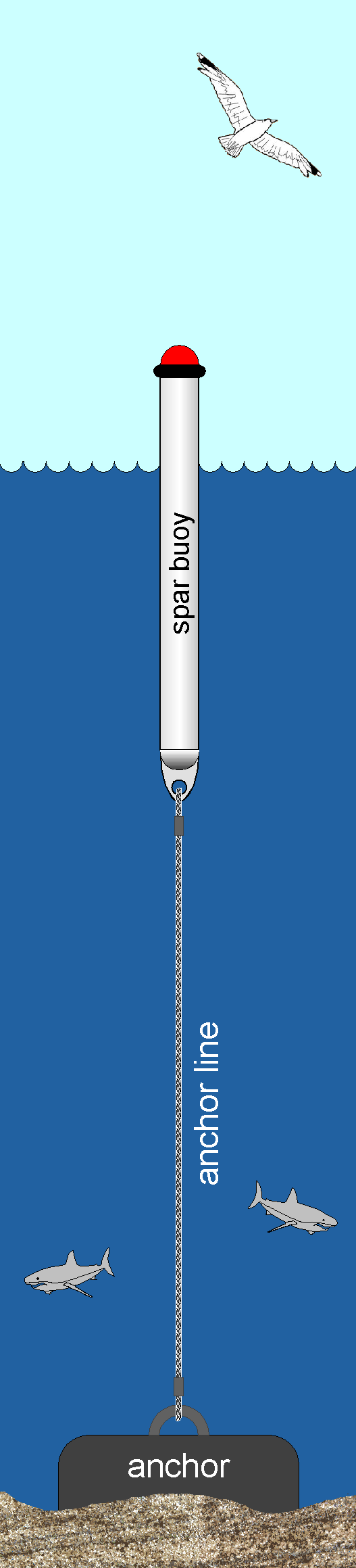
A diagram of an anchored spar buoy

A spar buoy is a tall, thin buoy that floats upright in the water and is characterized by a small water plane area and a large mass. Because they tend to be stable ocean platforms, spar buoys are popular for making oceanographic measurements. Adjustment of the water plane area and the mass allows spar buoys to be tuned so they tend to not respond to wave forcing. This characteristic differentiates them from large water plane area buoys such as discus buoys that tend to be wave followers. Spar buoys are often used as stable platforms for wave measurement devices and air–sea interaction measurements. Spar buoys range in length from around one metre to the 108-metre (354-foot) RP FLIP. To avoid the difficulties inherent with shipboard launch and recovery, helicopter deployment of large spar buoys has been studied.

== See also ==
- Spar (platform)
