= Milo Backus =

American geophysicist (1932–2018)

- Born: Milo Morlan Backus III; May 3, 1932; Chicago, Illinois, U.S.
- Died: May 25, 2018 (aged 86); Dallas, Texas, U.S.
- Education: Massachusetts Institute of Technology
- Occupation: Geophysicist

Milo Morlan Backus III (May 3, 1932 – May 25, 2018) was an American geophysicist.

== Life and career ==
Backus was born in Chicago, Illinois, the son of Milo Morlan Backus II and Dora Ette Dare. He attended and graduated from Thornton Township High School. After graduating, he attended the Massachusetts Institute of Technology, earning his PhD degree in 1956 in geochemistry. His brother George was also a geophysicist.

Backus served as the Wallace E. Pratt Professor of Geophysics at the University of Texas at Austin from 1975 to 1998. During his years as a professor, in 1982, he and geologist Robert L. Folk were named the Dave P. Carlton Centennial Professor by the University of Texas System Board of Regents.

== Death ==
Backus died on May 25, 2018, in Dallas, Texas, at the age of 86.
