= Nick Kaiser =

British cosmologist (1954–2023)

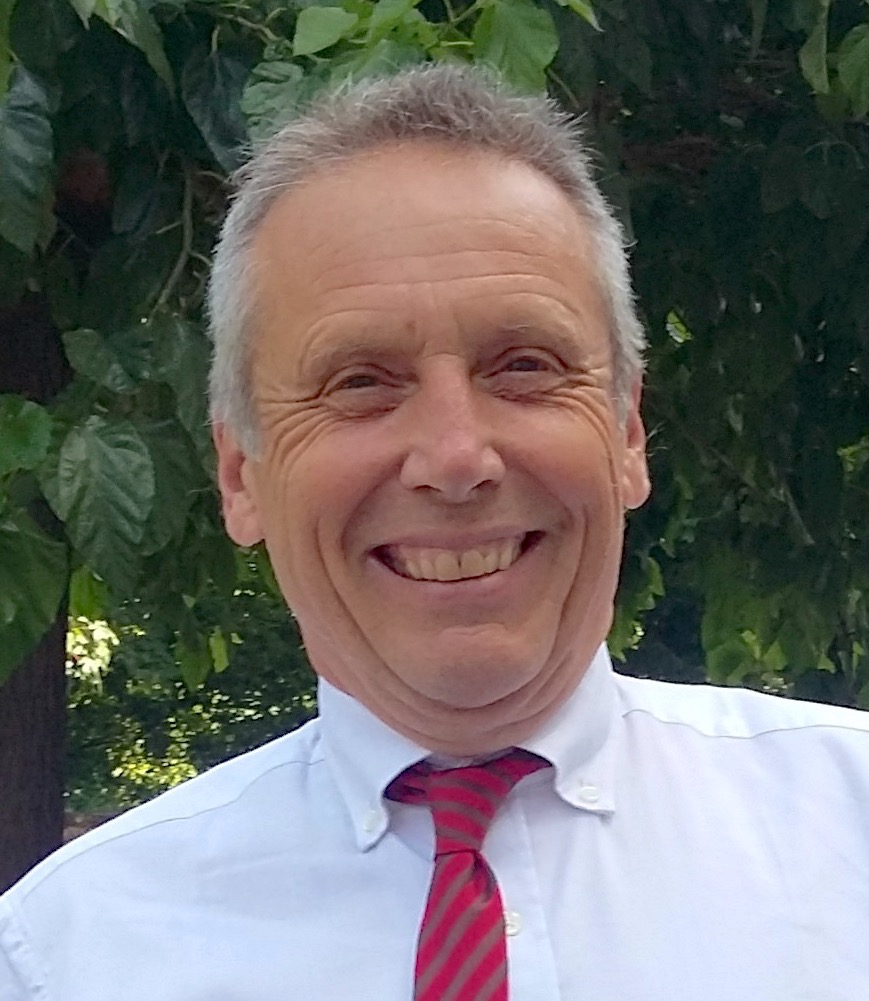
- Nick Kaiser at the 2019 Gruber Prize ceremony
- Born: 15 September 1954; Bucklow, England
- Died: 13 June 2023 (aged 68); Paris, France
- Education: University of Cambridge (PhD); University of Leeds (BSc)
- Awards: Fellow of the Royal Society (2008); Gold Medal of the Royal Astronomical Society (2017); Gruber Prize in Cosmology (2019)
- Scientific career
- Workplaces: École Normale Supérieure; University of Hawaiʻi; Canadian Institute for Theoretical Astrophysics
- Thesis: Anisotropy of the microwave background radiation (1982)
- Doctoral advisor: Martin Rees
- Doctoral students: Shaun Cole

Nicholas Kaiser FRS (15 September 1954 – 13 June 2023) was a British cosmologist. He was the son of Thomas Reeve Kaiser.

== Life and career ==
Kaiser was brought up in Sheffield and attended King Edward VII school from 1966 until 1973. He received his Bachelor's in physics at Leeds University in 1978, and his Part III in maths at University of Cambridge in 1979. He obtained his PhD in astronomy, also at the University of Cambridge, under the supervision of Martin Rees.

After postdoctoral positions at University of California, Berkeley, University of California, Santa Barbara, University of Sussex, and University of Cambridge, Kaiser was Canadian Institute for Theoretical Astrophysics Professor at the University of Toronto (1988–1997). In 1998 he moved to become Professor at the Institute for Astronomy of the University of Hawaiʻi. From 2017 to 2022 he was Professor at École Normale Supérieure in Paris.

Kaiser was elected a Fellow of the Royal Society in 2008.

Kaiser died of heart failure on 13 June 2023, at the age of 68.

== Works ==
Kaiser made major contributions to cosmology:

- He made the first calculation of the polarization of the cosmic microwave background (Kaiser 1983);
- Explained the higher bias of cluster galaxies relative to the matter field (Kaiser 1984);
- Made a detailed calculation of the statistics of density peaks in the primordial Universe (Bardeen, Bond, Kaiser & Szalay 1986);
- Introduced the mathematics of redshift-space distortions (Kaiser 1987);
- Computed the cosmic halo mass function using excursion set theory (Bond, Cole, Efstathiou & Kaiser 1991);
- First explained the departures of galaxy cluster scaling relations from simple self-similar models (Kaiser 1991); and
- Performed the first inversion of shear maps from weak gravitational lensing (Kaiser & Squires 1993).

Kaiser wrote articles on details of cosmological distance measures.

Kaiser was the initiator and Principal Investigator of the PanSTARRS imaging survey of most of the sky.

== Awards and honors ==
Kaiser won numerous awards and honors including:

- Ontario Fellow of the Canadian Institute for Advanced Research Cosmology Program (1988)
- Helen B. Warner Prize for Astronomy of the American Astronomical Society (1989)
- NSERC Steacie Fellowship (1991–92)
- Herzberg Medal of the Canadian Association of Physicists (1993)
- Rutherford Memorial Medal of the Royal Society of Canada (1997)
- Asteroid 16193 Nickaiser was named in his honor. The official naming citation was published by the Minor Planet Center on 23 May 2005 (M.P.C. 54175).
- University of Hawaiʻi Regents Medal for Excellence in Research (2014)
- Gold Medal of the Royal Astronomical Society (2017)
- Gruber Prize in Cosmology (2019)
