= Robert Hutchison (meteoriticist) =

British researcher

- Education: University of Glasgow
- Scientific career
- Institutions: University of Leeds; Nigerian Geological Survey Agency; Natural History Museum

Robert Hutchison (1938 – 26 January 2007) was a British scientist who was the curator of Meteorites at the Natural History Museum. He received the Gold Medal of the Royal Astronomical Society in 2000, and published several popular books on meteorites.

== Biography ==
=== Early life and education ===
Hutchison attended the University of Glasgow studying geology before receiving appointments at the University of Leeds and the Nigerian Geological Survey Agency. He joined the Natural History Museum in 1969.

=== Scientific career ===
Hutchison's most important research regarded the discovery of the young age of the Nakhla meteorite. This would lead to the discovery of the Martian origin of this meteorite and other related meteorites, which Hutchison directly contributed to. He was then directly involved in studies looking at hydrated minerals within these meteorites, which provided conclusions about water flow on Mars and other celestial bodies, and would lead to the discovery of interstellar material within the samples.

A major research interest of Hutchison was chondrites, in particular chondrules. Hutchison used research in the area to advocate for a more planetary rather than nebular origin for primitive asteroids. Hutchison encountered igneous textures in the Barwell meteorite which should come from a differentiated parent body, indicating the formation of large differentiated bodies before the formation of primitive asteroids. These and other results, with an older-than-expected igneous clast being discovered by Hutchison, lead to revisions to the estimated timeline of solar system formation.

Hutchison officially retired from his curator position in 1997. In 2000, he received the Gold Medal of the Royal Astronomical Society. He published Meteorites : A Petrologic, Chemical and Isotopic Synthesis in 2004, which Caroline Smith rated as " the core textbook for someone who is wanting to get into meteorite research professionally" in an article from 2010.

Hutchison died in 2007 from complications following a collapsed lung.

Hutchison was a fellow of the Royal Astronomical Society, The Meteoritical Society, and the Mineralogical Society. The asteroid 5308 Hutchison was named in his honour.

== Bibliography ==
- The Search for Our Beginning: An Enquiry Based on Meteorite Research into the Origin of Our Planet and of Life (1983)
- (with A.W.R Bevan and A.L. Graham) Catalogue of meteorites : with special reference to those represented in the collection of the Natural History Museum, London (1985)
- (with Andrew Graham) Meteorites: The Key to Our Existence (1992)
- Meteorites: A Petrologic, Chemical and Isotopic Synthesis (2004)
