= James Freeman Gilbert =

American geophysicist (1931–2014)

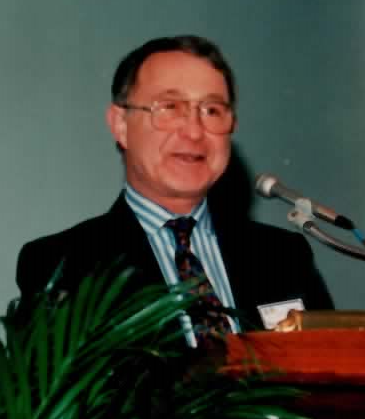
- Born: August 9, 1931; Vincennes, Indiana
- Died: August 15, 2014 (aged 83)
- Education: MIT
- Known for: Seismology
- Spouse: Sally Gilbert
- Scientific career
- Fields: Geophysics

James Freeman Gilbert (August 9, 1931 – August 15, 2014) was an American geophysicist, best known for his work with George E. Backus on inverting geophysical data, and also for his role in establishing an international network of long-period seismometers.

Gilbert was born in Vincennes, Indiana. A 1949 graduate of Lawrenceburg High School (Kentucky), his undergraduate and graduate degrees were earned from MIT (B.S., 1953, and Ph.D. in geophysics, 1956), and he continued at MIT as a postdoctoral fellow until 1957, when he moved to the University of California, Los Angeles. At UCLA he was an assistant, then associate, professor, but left to take an appointment as a senior researcher at Texas Instruments. In 1961, he was recruited by Walter Munk to the Institute of Geophysics and Planetary Physics (IGPP) at the Scripps Institution of Oceanography, also becoming a professor of geophysics at the University of California, San Diego. He remained at UCSD through the remainder of his career, and became an emeritus professor.

In his later years, Gilbert enjoyed extensive world travel with his wife, Sally Gilbert. He died due to complications resulting from a car accident in Southern Oregon on August 15, 2014. He was 83 years old.

== Contributions ==
Gilbert was among the first to recognize that the free oscillations of the Earth (so-called bell-ringing modes) could be measured immediately following large earthquakes, and could be used to produce structural models of the inner earth. In collaboration with Adam Dziewonski, he applied these ideas first to seismic records from the 1964 Alaska earthquake and then to records from the 1970 Colombia earthquake. In this context he and Backus developed robust methods for inverting seismic data.

By the early 1970s it was clear that better data from long-period seismometers was needed for this kind of work. Gilbert convinced geophysicist/philanthropist Cecil Green to fund a network of seismometers designed to provide data for global studies of the Earth. The first of 40 stations of this International Deployment of Accelerometers (IDA) array (the acronym also commemorating co-philanthropist Ida Green) was installed in 1974, and it continues in operation to this day.

== Awards ==
Gilbert had received many honors, including the Gold Medal of the Royal Astronomical Society in 1981; the William Bowie Medal of American Geophysical Union in 1999; and the Harry Fielding Reid Medal of the Seismological Society of America in 2004. In 1990, Freeman was awarded the Balzan Prize for Geophysics (solid earth) for his outstanding contribution to our knowledge of the Earth's deep interior.

== See also ==
- Backus–Gilbert method
- List of geophysicists
