= George Edward Backus =

American geophysicist

George Edward Backus (born May 24, 1930) is an American geophysicist, best known for his work with J. Freeman Gilbert on inverse methods for geophysical data. He is also notably credited with advancing the dynamo theory on the origin of the Earth's magnetic field.

Born in Chicago, Backus did his undergraduate and graduate training at the University of Chicago, receiving a M.S. in mathematics in 1950 and a Ph.D. in physics in 1956. During 1957–1958 he worked as a physicist in Project Matterhorn in Princeton, then moving to MIT for two years as assistant professor of mathematics. In 1960 he moved to Scripps Institution of Oceanography and the associated University of California, San Diego where he has spent the rest of his career. Backus was professor of geophysics until 1994, and subsequently a research professor of geophysics. His brother Milo was also a geophysicist.

Backus is the winner of many awards, including the Gold Medal of the Royal Astronomical Society (1986) and the John Adam Fleming Medal of the American Geophysical Union (1986), and he was elected a fellow of the American Geophysical Union (1967) and of the John Simon Guggenheim Memorial Foundation (1963 and 1970). He is an elected member of the National Academy of Sciences, the American Academy of Arts and Sciences, and of the Académie des Sciences of France.

== See also ==
- Backus–Gilbert method
- List of geophysicists
