= RP FLIP =

Open ocean research platform

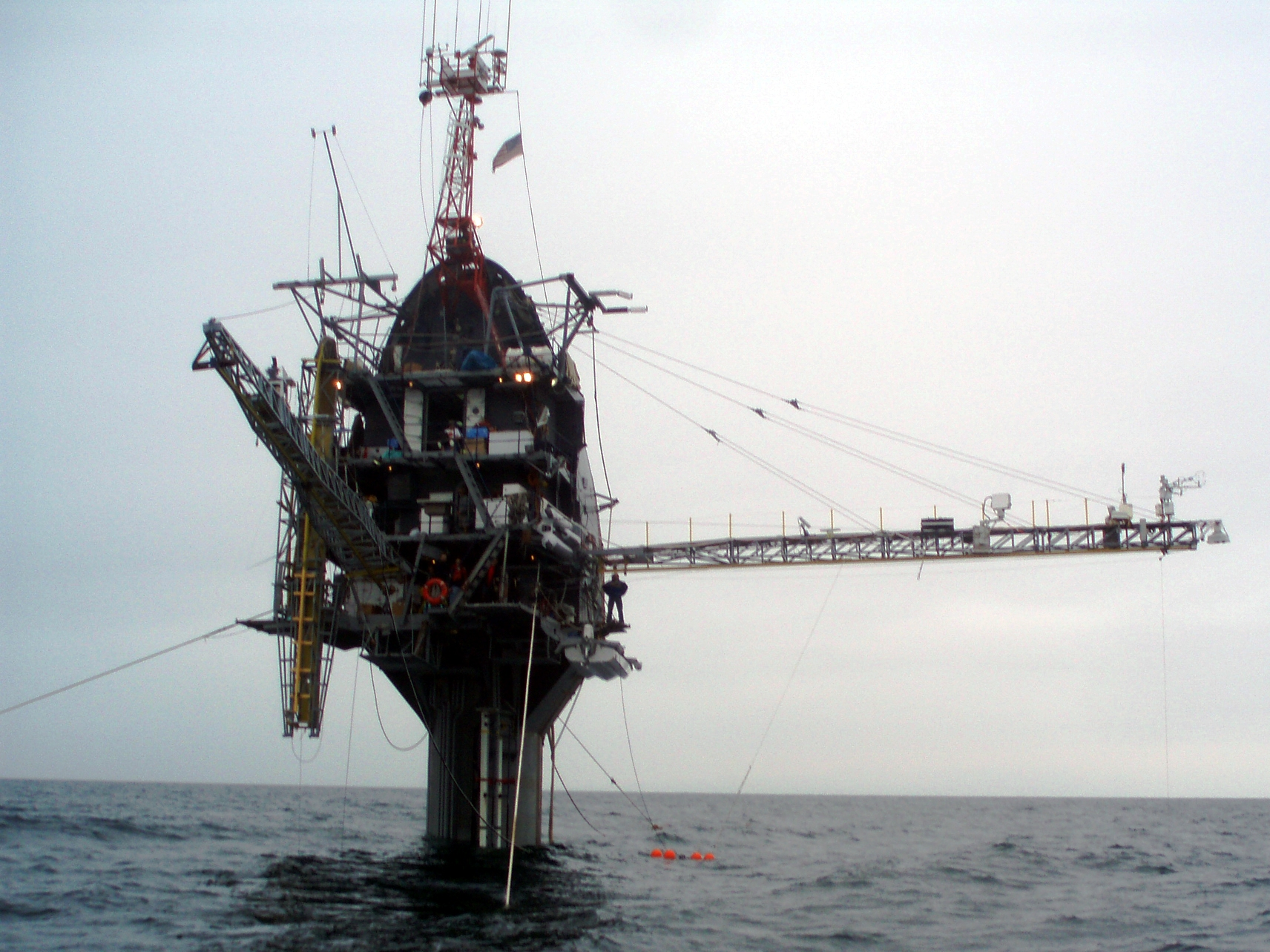

History

United States
- Owner: DEEP
- Operator: Scripps Institution of Oceanography (former)
- Builder: Gunderson Brothers Engineering; Portland, Oregon
- Cost: Approximately US$600,000
- Launched: 22 June 1962
- Completed: 23 July 1962
- In service: September 1962
- Out of service: August 2023
- Identification: Call sign: WI7115; MMSI number: 338040561
- Status: Undergoing refit at La Ciotat, France

General characteristics
- Type: Research platform
- Displacement: 700 tons
- Length: 108 m (355 ft)
- Beam: 7.93 m (26.0 ft)
- Draught: Towed: 3.83 m (12.6 ft); Deployed: 91.4 m (300 ft)
- Installed power: 2 × 150 kW (200 hp) diesel generators; 1 × 40 kW (54 hp) aux generator
- Propulsion: None
- Speed: Towed: 7–10 kn (8–12 mph; 13–19 km/h)
- Endurance: 35 days
- Capacity: Fresh water: 5,680 L (1,500 US gal); Water generation: 120 L/h (31 gal/h)
- Complement: 5 crew, 11 researchers

R/P FLIP (floating instrument platform) is a semi-submersible open ocean research platform that was owned by the U.S. Office of Naval Research (ONR) and operated by the Scripps Institution of Oceanography. The platform is 108 meters (355 ft) long and is designed to partially flood and pitch backward 90°, resulting in only the front 17 meters (55 ft) of the platform pointing up out of the water, with bulkheads becoming decks. When flipped, most of the buoyancy for the platform is provided by water at depths below the influence of surface waves, hence FLIP is stable and mostly immune to wave action, similar to a spar buoy.

At the end of a mission, compressed air is pumped into the ballast tanks in the flooded section and the platform, which has no propulsion, returned to its horizontal position so it can be towed to a new location. The platform is frequently mistaken for a capsized ocean transport ship.

FLIP's last research cruise was in late 2017, with ONR ending its support of the vessel in 2020. It was berthed at the Nimitz Marine Facility pier (Scripps) in Point Loma until being towed away to be scrapped on August 4, 2023. However, FLIP was purchased in 2024 by the DEEP organization with plans to overhaul and modernize the platform for ocean research.

== History ==
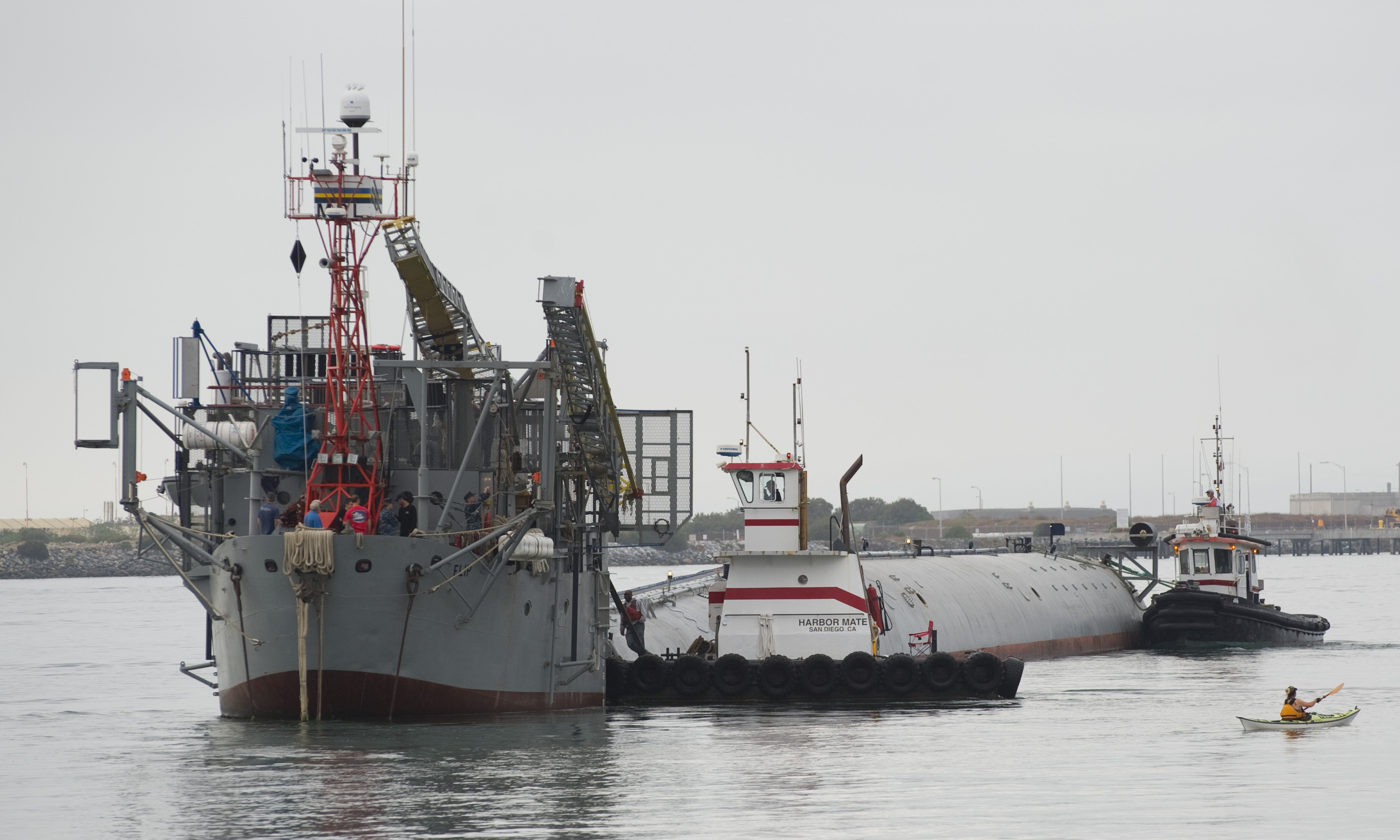
R/P FLIP under tow, 2012

The Marine Physical Laboratory (MPL) of Scripps Institution of Oceanography created FLIP with funding from the Office of Naval Research and the assistance of the commercial naval architecture firm The Glosten Associates. FLIP was originally built to support research into the fine-scale phase and amplitude fluctuations in undersea sound waves caused by thermal gradients and sloping ocean bottoms. This acoustic research was conducted as a portion of the Navy's SUBROC program.

Development started in January 1960 after a conversation between MPL researcher Frederick H. Fisher and MPL Director Fred N. Spiess regarding stability problems that Fisher was encountering when using the submarine USS Baya (SS-318) as a research platform. Spiess recalled a suggestion from Allyn Vine that upending a ship might make it more stable, based on Vine's observation of a Navy mop floating in waves. Fisher was subsequently assigned to work on the feasibility and later development of such a vessel. The Gunderson Brothers Engineering Company in Portland, Oregon, launched FLIP on 22 June 1962.

== Capabilities ==
FLIP was designed to study wave height, acoustic signals, water temperature and density, and for the collection of meteorological data. Because of the potential interference with the acoustic instruments, FLIP had no means of propulsion. It required towing to open water, where it drifted freely or was anchored.

FLIP displaced 700 tons. It carried a crew of five, plus up to eleven scientists. It was capable of operating independently during month-long missions without resupply. It could be operated around the world, although it normally operated off the west coast of the United States from a home base at Scripps' Nimitz Marine Facility in San Diego, California. The ship had specially designed interiors: some fixtures, such as the toilet seats, could flip 90°, and the shower heads were curved 90°. There were overhead lights on the surfaces that were the ceilings in both the towing (horizontal) and flipped orientations.

== Research ==
FLIP was used on a number of research expeditions at Scripps, often towed off shore of California, with the last cruise being September–October 2017.

Research conducted on FLIP has included studies of:

- the relation of temperature variations in the ocean to fluctuations in intensity and direction of sound waves;
- waves generated from storms in the South Pacific, for which FLIP was stationed between Hawaii and Alaska;
- turbulence and thermal structure of the ocean;
- amplitude and directionality of internal waves;
- energy transfer between the ocean and atmosphere in which wind velocity, humidity, and temperature profiles immediately above the ocean surface were measured;
- ambient noise intensity and direction using vertical hydrophone arrays suspended from FLIP and horizontal arrays (DIMUS) at the bottom of FLIP;
- long-range sound propagation; variation in properties of the earth's crust, for which FLIP was used as a listening platform for explosive sound signals launched from four ships going away from FLIP in four different directions;
- simultaneous visual and acoustic observations of whales and dolphins;
- effects of pressure on sound attenuation;
- scattering of sound from the sea surface and reverberation.

== Decommissioning ==
Following the COVID-19 pandemic and reduced funding, the decision was taken to scrap the platform. In August 2023, Rob Sparrock, the program officer overseeing ONR's research vessel program noted that it “... would cost about $8 million to make FLIP useable for another five or 10 years, but that funding could be better used elsewhere.”

On August 3, 2023, the storied vessel departed for a scrap yard in Mexico, apart from an instrument boom which will be installed on a pier at Scripps.

At the decommissioning, Scripps’ Marine Physical Laboratory (MPL) Director Eric Terrill lauded the system and the spirit that inspired it, saying “FLIP set the stage for thinking big about what could be done with technology to enable new scientific discoveries ... It was built in an era of risk-taking; a spirit that we try to embrace to this day and encourage in the next generation of seagoing scientists.”

== Purchase and refit ==
On 23 October 2024, DEEP, an organization working to expand access for ocean exploration, announced the purchase of FLIP and their plans to overhaul and modernize the platform for ocean research. It will also support the deployment of DEEP's Sentinel habitats, enhancing their extended research network. FLIP was transported from Mexico to La Ciotat, France where it will undergo a 12-to-18 month refit.

== Gallery ==
Video of FLIP flipping

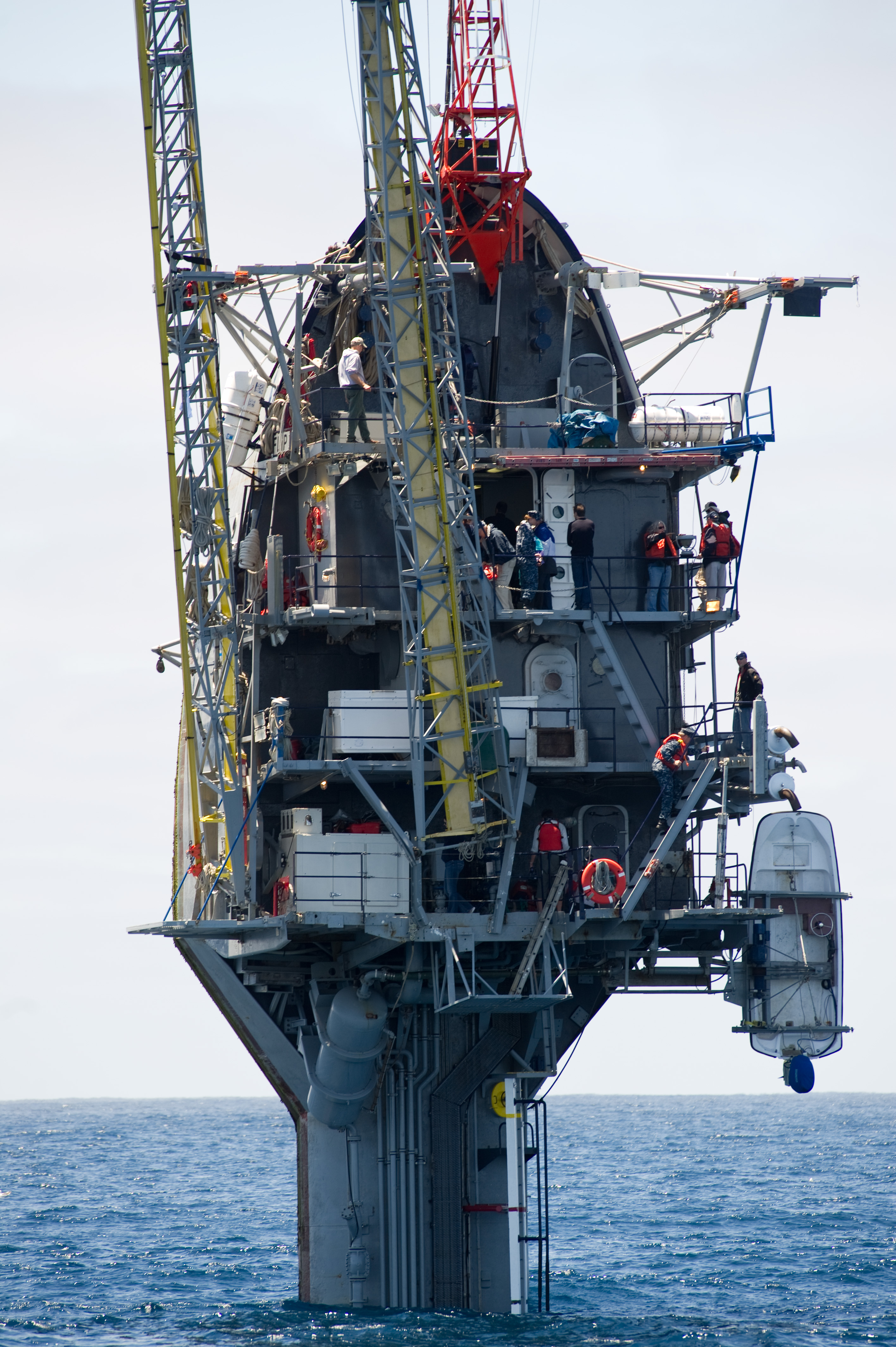
FLIP vertical in 2012

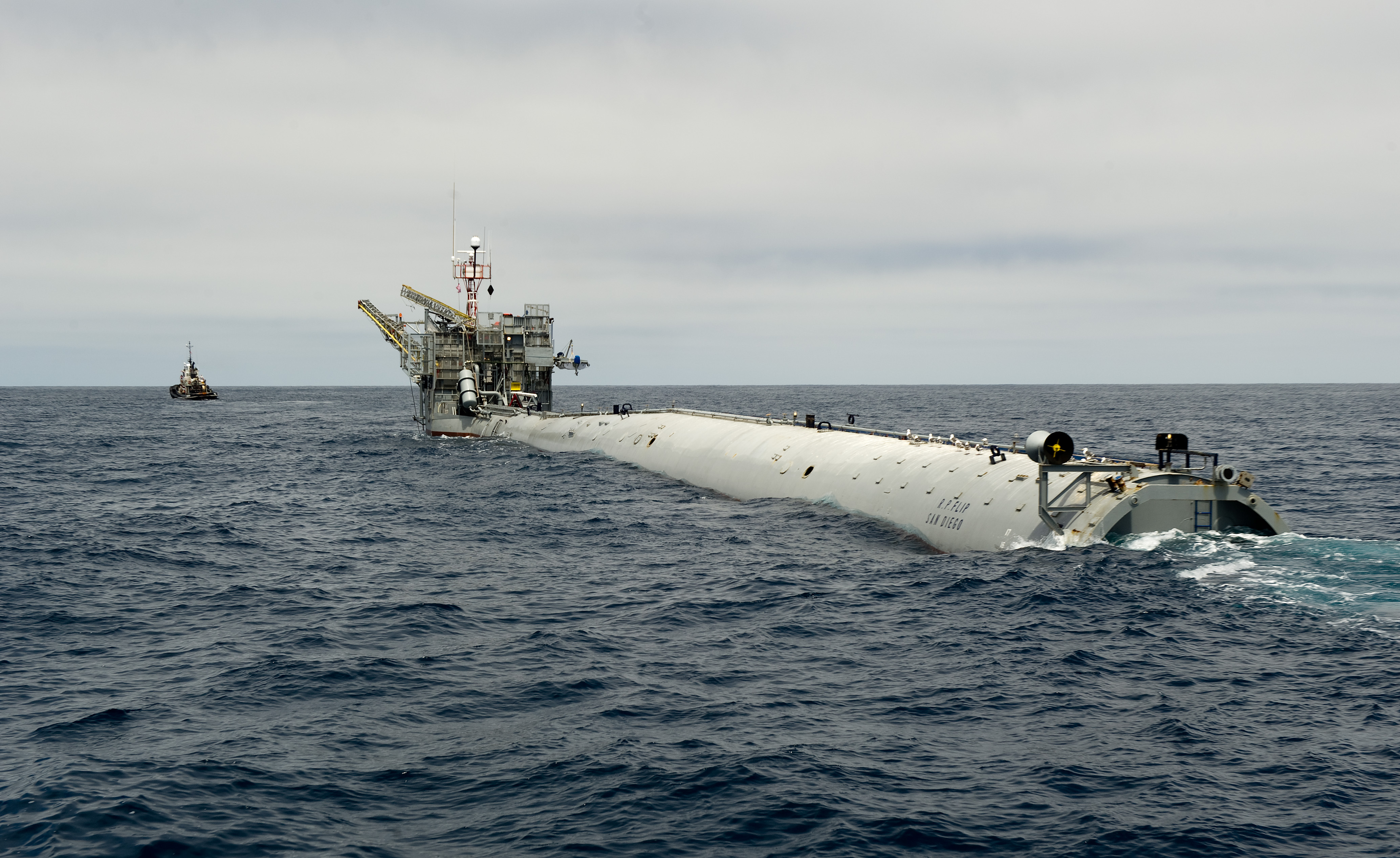
FLIP under tow in 2012

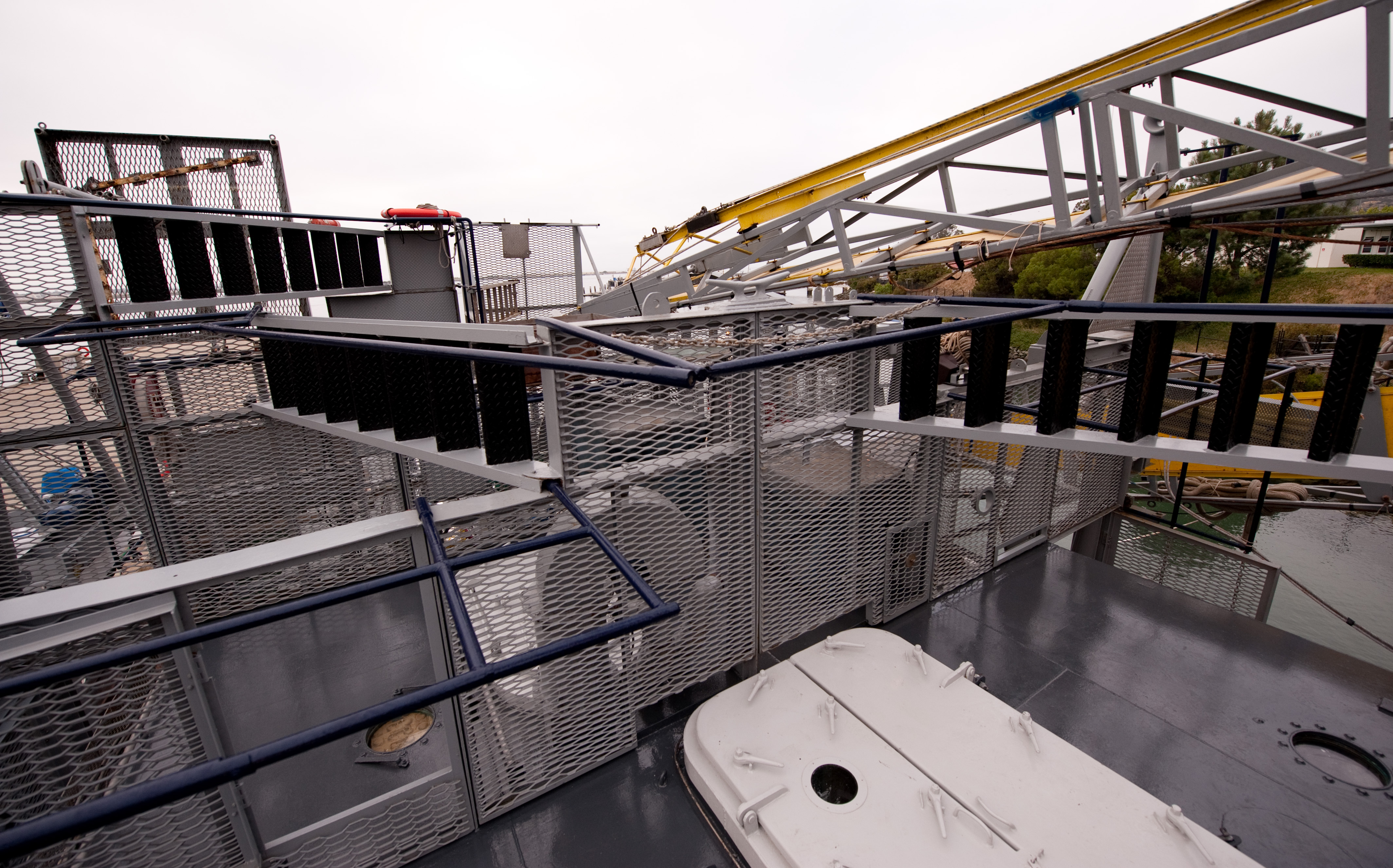
FLIP in horizontal position, showing stairway used when positioned vertically
