= Jack Jacobs (disambiguation) =

Jack Jacobs (1919–1974), was an American and Canadian football player.

Jack Jacobs may also refer to:

- Jack Jacobs (cricketer) (1909–2003), New Zealand cricketer
- John Arthur “Jack” Jacobs (1916–2003), geophysicist
- Jack H. Jacobs (born 1945), Medal of Honor recipient
- Jack B. Jacobs (born 1942), Delaware judge

== See also ==
- John Jacobs (disambiguation)
