= Faraday Institute for Science and Religion =

Research institute in the UK

- Established: 2006
- Executive Director: Graham Budd
- Faculty: Sarah Perrett (Associate Director); Denis Alexander (Emeritus Director) Robert (Bob) White
- Address: The Woolf Building, Madingley Road, Cambridge, CB3 0UB, UK
- Location: Cambridge, England
- Website: www.faraday.cam.ac.uk

The Faraday Institute for Science and Religion is an interdisciplinary academic research institute based in Cambridge, England. It is named after the 19th-century English scientist Michael Faraday, the pioneer of electromagnetic induction.

It was established in 2006 by a $2,000,000 grant from the John Templeton Foundation to carry out academic research, to foster understanding of the interaction between science and religion, and to engage public understanding in both these subject areas. The institute also leads debate on wider issues such as sustainability and education.

== Senior staff ==
The institute's Executive Director is Graham Budd, and its Associate Director is Sarah Perrett. The emeritus directors are Denis Alexander and Robert (Bob) White.

== Activities ==
The institute organises a wide range of activities, including:

1. Free, regular lectures and seminars on a range of science and religion topics.
2. Providing access to resources such as downloadable audio and video recordings of over 350 Faraday Institute courses, lectures and seminars. The website also includes a wide range of written material, and an online shop featuring heavily discounted books.
3. Short, intensive weekend, and midweek courses. These are open to graduates or undergraduates from any university in the world, of any faith or none. Discounts and bursaries are available to students and those from low-income countries. Some courses give an overview of the science-religion debate, while others focus on a specific topic.
4. Residential and day conferences which focus on a particular aspect of the interaction between science and religion.
5. Informing and improving the media's understanding of the interaction between science and religion.

Activities of the Faraday Institute have included:

- Hosting a workshop on "The Social, Political, and Religious Transformations of Biology" in September 2007. A book arising from the conference, "Biology and Ideology – From Descartes to Dawkins" (eds D.R. Alexander and R.L. Numbers) was published in 2010 by University of Chicago Press.
- A project on evolution, faith, and Charles Darwin, in collaboration with the think tank Theos.
- The "Test of Faith" documentary, course, and books.
- Commissioning the play Let Newton Be, which was reviewed in Science and Nature.
- Organisation of The Georges Lemaître Anniversary Conference, April 2011 at Sidney Sussex College, Cambridge.
- Organisation of the ‘Sustainability in Crisis’ Conference, Sept 26–28, 2011, held at Murray Edwards College, Cambridge.

In his former capacity as director and now as emeritus director of the institute, Denis Alexander has commented on science and religion in UK national media and international media.

The institute has published 20 Faraday Papers discussing various science and faith issues, which are available online in 12 different languages. Its website hosts recordings of more than 350 lectures. Most of these lectures can also be found on the University of Cambridge Video & Audio Archive. Its work, along with that of other similar organizations, has led to a "complete reassessment of historical literature on the relationship between science and religion."
