= Chris Chapman =

Chris Chapman may refer to:

- Chris Chapman (rugby league, born 1966), former rugby league footballer
- Chris Chapman (seismologist) (born 1945), British seismologist
- Chris Chapman (producer) (born 1981), television producer, director and writer
- Christine Chapman (born 1956), Welsh politician
- Christopher Chapman (1927–2015), Canadian filmmaker
- Chris Chapman (real tennis), Australian real tennis player
