= John Jacobs =

John Jacobs may refer to:

- John C. Jacobs (1838–1894), New York politician
- John H. Jacobs (1847–1934), pioneer of Michigan sandstone industry
- John Jacobs (English golfer) (1925–2017), European Tour player and internationally known golf coach and instructor
- Johnny Jacobs (1916–1982), American television announcer
- John Arthur “Jack” Jacobs (1916-2003), geophysicist
- John Jacobs (American golfer) (born 1945), PGA Tour and Champions Tour player
- John Jacobs (activist) (1947–1997), SDS member and "weatherman"
- John Jacobs (evangelist) (born 1959), best known for his role in Christian ministries that employ feats of strength
- John Jacobs (producer), American film and television producer
- John E. Jacobs (1903–1971), American educator
- John Hornor Jacobs (born 1971), American author
- John S. Jacobs (c. 1826-1873), African-American author and abolitionist

== See also ==
- Jack Jacobs (disambiguation)
- Jon Jacobs (disambiguation)
- John Jacob (disambiguation)
