= John Jacob =

John Jacob may refer to:

- John Jacob, Marquis of Montferrat (1395–1445)
- Sir John Jacob, 1st Baronet (c. 1597–1666), royalist MP in England
- Sir John Jacob, 2nd Baronet of Bromley (c. 1633–1674), his son, of the Jacob baronets
- Sir John Jacob, 3rd Baronet of Bromley (c. 1665–1740), his son, of the Jacob baronets
- John J. Jacob (Kentucky businessman) (1770–1852), Kentucky businessman, financier, and philanthropist
- John Jacob (East India Company officer) (1812–1858), British officer and founder of Jacobabad in Pakistan
- John J. Jacob (West Virginia politician) (1829–1893), Governor of West Virginia in the United States
- John Jacob (Indiana politician), member of the Indiana House of Representatives
- John Edward Jacob (born 1934), president of the National Urban League in the United States
- John C. Jacob (1936–2008), environmental pioneer in Kerala, India
- John P. Jacob (born 1957), American writer and curator
- E. John Jacob, member of the Kerala Legislative Assembly
- S. John Jacob, member of the Tamil Nadu Legislative Assembly

== See also ==
- "John Jacob Jingleheimer Schmidt", a traditional children's song
- John Jacobs (disambiguation)
