= C1 World Dialogue =

Swiss foundation

C1 World Dialogue is an initiative whose stated mission is to "support and promote, propagate and preserve, peace harmony and friendship between the Western and Islamic Worlds". The initiative has its origins in the Council of One Hundred Leaders (C-100) West-Islamic Dialogue originally launched by the World Economic Forum in response to the attacks of 11 September 2001 on the USA. Since then, the group has evolved into an autonomous body with an institutional base as a Swiss foundation, based in Basel. The president of the General Conference of the organization is former British Prime Minister Tony Blair.

== Main activities ==
The initiative publishes the Annual Dialog Report, that combines data and research about Muslim-West relations with commentary and analysis. The Reports stated aims are to "provide the knowledge-base for the actions needed to achieve sustainably improved Muslim-West relations that are conducive to peace, stability and mutual flourishing." The first version of the report was published with the WEF in 2008 at the annual meeting of the World Economic Forum in Davos on January 24 Another edition was launched in 2009 at events in Egypt, the UK and United States.

The report consists of four sections. The first explores the basis for building a common platform for practical cooperation. The second one outlines the conceptual and theoretical basis for the work while section three presents current extensive survey and other data about the state of relations based on the continuous research of PEW and Media Tenor. The fourth section contains current examples of cross-religious dialogue in practice.

The C-1 is developing practical work in several areas led by its constituent Commissions with a particular focus on work with the Media and in Education. It is also working to promote the platform for cooperation offered by the Common Word initiative proposing cooperation on the basis of the twin Commandments to love God and our neighbour. It is also developing a rapid response capacity in order to help de-escalate unstable situations that suddenly arise and which may lead to conflict or misunderstanding. Recent press releases have addressed the minaret controversy in Switzerland and the riots against Christians in Gojra, Pakistan. The rapid response work in communication is coordinated by the UN Alliance of Civilizations.

The C1 World Dialogue plans to hold its annual General Conference, which will bring together all the participating members, next year in Sarajevo. The president of the General Conference is the former British Prime Minister Tony Blair.

== Members ==
The C-1 is led by the Co-chairs Ali Gomaa, the Grand Mufti of Egypt and the Bishop of London Richard Chartres together with an Executive which the multi-stakeholder character of the initiative and includes public and religious leaders and representatives from media, business, academia and the civil society. Additional members of the Executive Board include Patriarch Theophilos III of Jerusalem, the Grand Mufti of Bosnia, Mustafa Ceric, Diarmuid Martin, Archbishop of Dublin, Kai Diekmann Editor of Bild (Germany), professors John Esposito of Georgetown, Anthony Grayling of London, Ibrahim Kalin (Senior Advisor to the Prime Minister of Turkey), David Ford of Cambridge and Miroslav Volf of Yale, Muna Abu-Sulayman and the founder of the People-to-People President Mary Eisenhower. Theodore Cardinal McCarrick also serves as a special Advisor.

The initiative was founded by Prince Ghazi bin Muhammad bin Talal of Jordan, Canon Alistair Macdonald-Radcliff and publisher Roland Schatz, who were also joined by the New York-based businessman Haris Hromic.
