= The Good Book (book) =

2011 anthology compiled by A. C. Grayling

- First US edition
- Author: A. C. Grayling
- Language: English
- Subject: Secularism, humanism
- Publisher: Walker & Company
- Publication date: 2011
- Publication place: United Kingdom, United States
- Media type: Print (hardcover)
- ISBN: 978-0-8027-1737-5
- Followed by: The God Argument

The Good Book is an anthology compiled by A. C. Grayling. It was published in March 2011 by Walker & Company (a US imprint of Bloomsbury) with the subtitle A Humanist Bible, and in April 2011 by Bloomsbury with the subtitle A Secular Bible.

The book was designed as a secular alternative to religious text, and to be read as a narrative drawing on non-religious philosophy, including that from Ancient Greek, Chinese, Roman, Indian and Arab civilizations, as well as the European Renaissance and the Age of Enlightenment. The book also contains a summary of scientific discoveries from the 19th century to the present day.

== Structure ==
The Good Book's organizational system is similar to that of the Bible. It is divided into fourteen books (Genesis, Wisdom, Parables, Concord, Lamentations, Consolations, Sages, Songs, Histories, Proverbs, The Lawgiver, Acts, Epistles, and The Good). Each book is divided into short chapters, and each chapter is divided into numbered verses, so that chapter and verse can be referenced numerically.

The volume's final book features a version of the Ten Commandments (The Good 8:11):

1. Love well
2. Seek the good in all things
3. Harm no others
4. Think for yourself
5. Take responsibility
6. Respect nature
7. Do your utmost
8. Be informed
9. Be kind
10. Be courageous

These come with the post-thought that the reader "at least, sincerely try" and an addendum in (The Good 8:12), "Add to these ten injunctions, this: O friends, let us always be true to ourselves and to the best in things, so that we can always be true to one another."

== Reception ==
The book received a variety of reviews. The book was well covered in The New York Times and given a warm reception on The Colbert Report. Genevieve Fox wrote in The Telegraph, "If the humanists are in the ascendant, then Grayling's self-help book for the spiritually rudderless will be snapped up", while Christopher Hart, reviewing it in the Sunday Times, concluded that: "Compared to the original, it's a molehill at the foot of Everest". Reviews in The Observer and Private Eye satirised the book for its arbitrary rejection of religious content and the proselytising of the author. It received a positive review in the Sunday Express, where Terry Waite praised it "as a source for inspiration and wisdom". A review in the Irish Independent concluded that "to try to compose a secular bible is itself a well-intentioned undertaking. But can it ever have anything like the influence of the Bible...no." In the religious journal First Things, R. J. Snell writes: "While the marketing presents the author as provocateur, one finds instead the reflections of a decent, middle-aged man with a thorough education, now thinking about his loves and aspirations in light of the erosive power of time. Grayling ignores religion more than he attacks it." In an Evening Standard article celebrating the King James Version of the Bible, David Sexton attacks several books by atheist authors and describes The Good Book as "unreadable, not merely just because it is boring but because it is nauseating".

Grayling discussed The Good Book with the Archbishop of Canterbury, Rowan Williams, before a large audience on London's South Bank, and with Richard Holloway, former Bishop of Edinburgh, at the 2011 Edinburgh Book Festival. In a YouTube video at the Sydney Writers Festival, Grayling responded to criticisms of The Good Book, stating: "some of the reviews have been hysterically hostile".

== Editions ==
- The Good Book: A Humanist Bible. New York: Walker, 2011. ISBN 978-0-8027-1737-5.
- The Good Book: A Secular Bible. London: Bloomsbury, 2011. ISBN 978-0-7475-9960-9.
- The Good Book: A Secular Bible. Revised Version. London: Bloomsbury, 2016. ISBN 978-1-4088-7134-8.
