= Alistair Macdonald-Radcliff =

English Anglican priest

The Very Reverend Canon Alistair Macdonald-Radcliff
- Rector of the Church of the Advent
- Church: The Episcopal Church
- Province: Province I
- Diocese: Massachusetts
- In office: 2024–Present

Orders
- Ordination: 1999 (Deacon); June 24, 2001 (Priest)

Personal details
- Born: Alistair Macdonald-Radcliff London, England
- Denomination: Anglican
- Occupation: Priest
- Education: London Metropolitan University (BA); University of London (MTh); University of Oxford; Yale University (STM) 1995

The Very Reverend Canon Alistair John Eyre Newburgh Macdonald-Radcliff is an English Anglican priest known for his leadership of various organizations connected to international development and inter-faith dialogue as well as his commentary upon international affairs. Macdonald-Radcliff is the Director General of the C1 World Dialogue, a group that has its origins in an initiative of the World Economic Forum. Its President is the former British Prime Minister Tony Blair. He was formerly a senior advisor to Lord Carey of Clifton and to the King Abdullah Bin Aziz International Center for Interreligious and Intercultural Dialogue, and was also the Dean of All Saints' Cathedral in Cairo. In 2024 he was admitted to the Most Venerable Order of the Hospital of St John of Jerusalem. Currently he serves as the Rector of the Church of the Advent in Boston, a Director of the Society for the Preservation of the Book of Common Prayer, and the Editor-in-Chief of The Anglican Way.
