= A. C. Grayling =

English philosopher

A. C. Grayling CBE FRSA FRSL
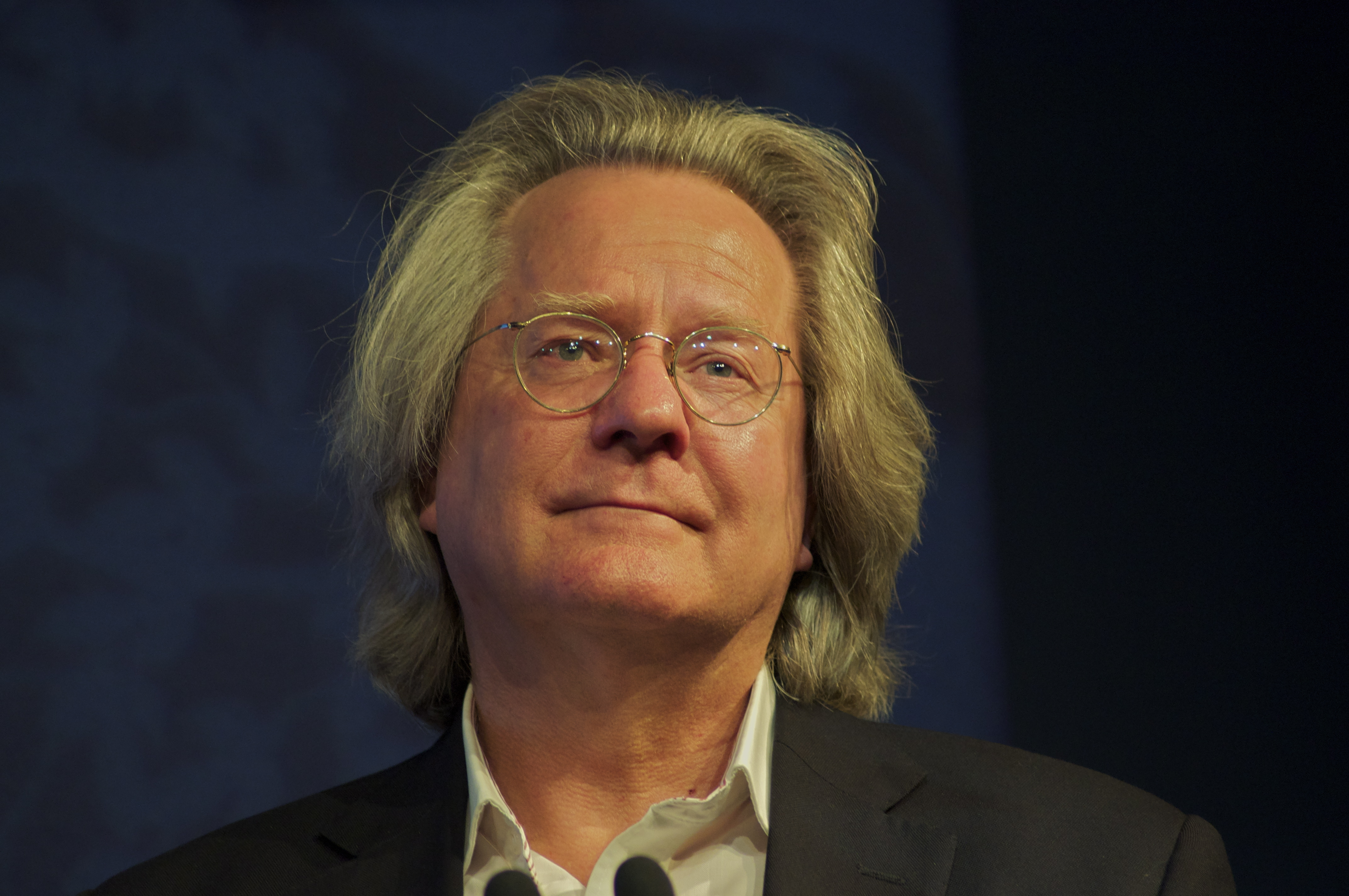
- At the 2011 Edinburgh International Book Festival

Master of the New College of the Humanities
- Incumbent
- Assumed office 2011

Personal details
- Born: Anthony Clifford Grayling; 3 April 1949 (age 77) Luanshya, Northern Rhodesia
- Children: 3
- Education: University of Sussex (BA, MA); University of London (BA); Magdalen College, Oxford (DPhil)
- Website: acgrayling.com

Education
- Thesis: Epistemological Scepticism and Transcendental Arguments (1981)
- Doctoral advisors: A. J. Ayer; P. F. Strawson

Philosophical work
- Era: Contemporary philosophy
- Region: Western philosophy
- School: Analytic philosophy; New Atheism
- Institutions: Bedford College, London, St Anne's College, Oxford, Birkbeck College, London, New College of the Humanities
- Main interests: Epistemology, history of ideas, humanist ethics, logic, metaphysics
- Notable ideas: Criticism of arguments for the existence of God

Anthony Clifford Grayling (/ˈɡreɪlɪŋ/; born 3 April 1949) is a British philosopher and author. He was born in Northern Rhodesia (now Zambia) and spent most of his childhood there and in Nyasaland (now Malawi). Until June 2011, he was Professor of Philosophy at Birkbeck, University of London, where he taught from 1991. In 2011 he founded and became the first Master of New College of the Humanities (now Northeastern University London), an independent undergraduate college in London. He is also a supernumerary fellow of St Anne's College, Oxford, where he formerly taught.

Grayling is the author of about 30 books on philosophy, biography, history of ideas, human rights and ethics, including The Refutation of Scepticism (1985), The Future of Moral Values (1997), Wittgenstein (1992), What Is Good? (2000), The Meaning of Things (2001), The Good Book (2011), The God Argument (2013), The Age of Genius: The Seventeenth Century and the Birth of the Modern Mind (2016) and Democracy and its Crisis (2017).

Grayling was a trustee of the London Library and a fellow of the World Economic Forum, and is a fellow of the Royal Society of Literature and the Royal Society of Arts. For a number of years he was a columnist for The Guardian newspaper, and presented the BBC World Service series Exchanges at the Frontier on science and society.

Grayling was a director and contributor at Prospect magazine from its foundation until 2016. He is a vice-president of Humanists UK, honorary associate of the National Secular Society, and Patron of the Defence Humanists. His main academic interests lie in epistemology, metaphysics, and philosophical logic and he has published works in these subjects. His political affiliations lie on the centre-left, and he has defended human rights and politically liberal values in print and by activism. He is associated in Britain with other New Atheists. He frequently appears in British media discussing philosophy and public affairs. In his book, Democracy and Its Crisis, Grayling argues that voting systems must be reformed to prevent certain results, such as Brexit and the 2016 election of Donald Trump.

== Early life and education ==
The son of Henry Clifford and Ursula Adelaide Grayling (née Burns), Grayling was born and raised in Luanshya, Northern Rhodesia (now Zambia), within the British expatriate enclave, and raised there and in Nyasaland (now Malawi) where his father worked as manager for the Standard Bank. He attended several boarding schools, including Falcon College in Southern Rhodesia (now Zimbabwe), from which he ran away after being regularly caned. His first exposure to philosophical writing was at the age of twelve, when he found an English translation of the Charmides, one of Plato's dialogues, in a local library. At age fourteen, he read G. H. Lewes's Biographical History of Philosophy (1846), which confirmed his ambition to study philosophy; he said it "superinduced order on the random reading that had preceded it, and settled my vocation".

Grayling had an elder sister Jennifer and brother John. When he was 19 years old, his elder sister Jennifer was murdered in Johannesburg. She had been born with brain damage, and after brain surgery to alleviate it at the age of 20 had experienced personality problems that led to emotional difficulties and a premature marriage. She was found dead in a river shortly after the marriage; she had been stabbed. When her parents went to identify her, her mother—already ill—had a heart attack and died. Grayling said he dealt with his grief by becoming a workaholic.

After moving to England in his teens, he spent three years at the University of Sussex, but said that although he applauded their intention to educate generalists, he wished to be a scholar, so in addition to his BA from Sussex, he also completed one in philosophy as a University of London external student. He went on to obtain an MA from Sussex, then attended Magdalen College, Oxford, where he was taught by P. F. Strawson and A. J. Ayer, obtaining his doctorate in 1981 for a thesis on Epistemological Scepticism and Transcendental Arguments. A part of that thesis is published as The Refutation of Scepticism (1985) and its themes are further developed in Scepticism and the Possibility of Knowledge (2008).

=== Career ===
Grayling lectured in philosophy at Bedford College, London, and St Anne's College, Oxford, before taking up a post in 1991 at Birkbeck, University of London, where in 1998 he became a reader in philosophy, and in 2005 a professor. In addition to his work on Berkeley, philosophical logic, the theory of knowledge, and the history of ideas, the latter including (as chief editor) the four-volume The Continuum Encyclopedia of British Philosophy, he wrote and edited several pedagogical works in philosophy, including An Introduction to Philosophical Logic (3rd ed., 1999) and the two volumes Philosophy: A Guide Through the Subject (1995) and Philosophy: Further Through the Subject (1998).

In his philosophical work, Grayling connected solutions to the problem of scepticism in epistemology with the questions about assertability and the problem of meaning in the philosophy of language and logic. A principal theme in his work is that considerations of metaphysics, which relate to what exists, has to be kept separate from the two connected questions of the relation of thought to its objects in the variety of domains over which thought ranges, and the mastery of discourses about those domains, where a justificationist approach is required.

Grayling resigned from Birkbeck in June 2011 to found and become the first master of the New College of the Humanities, an independent undergraduate college in London. In February 2019, Northeastern University, a private research university in Boston, Massachusetts, US, purchased the New College of the Humanities. He is a supernumerary fellow of St Anne's College, Oxford. He was a judge on the Man Booker Prize for 2003 and chairman of the judges for the 2014 Man Booker Prize. He has also been a judge on the Wellcome Trust Book Prize and the Art Fund prize.

In 2013 he was awarded the Forkosch Literary Prize, and in 2015 he received the Bertrand Russell Society Award. Grayling was appointed Commander of the Order of the British Empire (CBE) in the 2017 New Year Honours for services to philosophy.

== Public advocacy ==
For Grayling, work on technical problems is only one aspect of philosophy. Another aspect, one which has been at the centre of philosophy's place in history, has more immediate application to daily life: the questions of ethics, which revolve upon what Grayling calls the great Socratic question, 'How should one live?'. In pursuit of what he describes as 'contributing to the conversation society has with itself about possibilities for good lives in good societies', Grayling writes widely on contemporary issues, including war crimes, the legalisation of drugs, euthanasia, secularism, human rights and other topics in the tradition of Polemics. He has articulated positions on humanist ethics and on the history and nature of concepts of liberty as applied in civic life. In support of his belief that the philosopher should engage in public debate, he brings these philosophical perspectives to issues of the day in his work as a writer and as a commentator on radio and television.

Among his contributions to the discussion about religion in contemporary society he argues that there are three separable, though naturally connected debates:

(a) a metaphysical debate about what the universe contains; denying that it contains supernatural agencies of any kind makes him an atheist;
(b) a debate about the basis of ethics; taking the world to be a natural realm of natural law requires that humanity thinks for itself about the right and the good, based on our best understanding of human nature and the human condition; this makes him a humanist;
(c) a debate about the place of religious movements and organisations in the public domain; as a secularist Grayling argues that these should see themselves as civil society organisations on a par with trade unions and other NGOs, with every right to exist and to have their say, but no greater right than any other self-constituted, self-selected interest group.

On this last point, Grayling's view is that for historical reasons religions have an inflated place in the public domain out of all proportion to the numbers of their adherents or their intrinsic merits, so that their voice and influence is amplified disproportionately: with the result that they can distort such matters as public policy (e.g. on abortion) and science research and education (e.g. stem cells, teaching of evolution). He argues that winning the metaphysical and ethical debates is already abating the problems associated with (c) in more advanced Western societies, even the US. He sees his own major contribution as being the promotion of understanding of humanist ethics deriving from the philosophical tradition.

Between 1999 and 2002 Grayling wrote a weekly column in The Guardian called "The Last Word", on a different topic every week. In these columns, which also formed the basis of a series of books for a general readership, commencing with The Meaning of Things in 2001, Grayling made the basics of philosophy available to the layperson. He is a regular contributor to The Guardian's "Comment is free" group blog, and writes columns for, among others, the Prospect and New Scientist magazines.

Grayling is accredited with the United Nations Human Rights Council, and is a patron of Humanists UK, an Honorary Associate of the National Secular Society, Patron of the Defence Humanists, was a Trustee of the London Library, and a board member of the Society of Authors and an Honorary Patron of the Philosophy Foundation, a charity whose aim is to bring philosophy to the wider community, and particularly to disadvantaged schools. In 2003 he was a Booker Prize judge and Chairman of the Judges for the 2014 Man Booker Prize. In 2005, Grayling debated with Christian philosopher William Lane Craig on whether God can exist in an evil world. Grayling is also a Patron of the right to die organisation, My Death My Decision.

Grayling wrote a book on the allied strategic air offensive in World War II, Among the Dead Cities: The History and Moral Legacy of the WWII Bombing of Civilians in Germany and Japan (2006), as a contribution to the debate on the ethics of war. In September 2010, Grayling was one of 55 public figures who sent a letter to The Guardian expressing their opposition to Pope Benedict XVI's state visit to the UK. In August 2014, Grayling was one of 200 public figures who were signatories to a letter to The Guardian opposing Scottish independence in the run-up to September's referendum on that issue.

A. C. Grayling was one of the contributors to the book, We Are One: A Celebration of Tribal Peoples, released in October 2009. The book explores the cultures of peoples around the world, portraying both their diversity and the threats they face. Other contributors included not only western writers, such as Laurens van der Post, Noam Chomsky, Claude Lévi-Strauss, but also indigenous people, such as Davi Kopenawa Yanomami and Roy Sesana. The royalties from the sale of this book go to the indigenous rights organisation, Survival International.

In recent years Grayling has been campaigning against the UK Government's response to the 2016 United Kingdom European Union membership referendum result. In his book, Democracy and Its Crisis, Grayling argues that voting systems must be reformed to prevent certain results, such as Brexit and the election of Donald Trump. Grayling has tweeted that Brexit must be made to disappear like a "nasty, temporary, hiccup, soon forgotten".

== Personal life ==
Grayling lives in central London. He has two children, Anthony Jolyon Clifford Grayling and Georgina Eveline Ursula Grayling, from his first marriage and one daughter, Madeline Catherine Jennifer Grayling, from his second marriage to the novelist Katie Hickman.

== Positions held ==
- Fellow of the Royal Society of Literature
- Fellow of the Royal Society of Arts
- Fellow of the World Economic Forum (2000–2004)
- Member of the editorial boards of Reason in Practice and Prospect
- British Academy visitor to the Institute of Philosophy at the Chinese Academy of Social Sciences (1986)
- Director of the Sino-British Summer School in Philosophy in Beijing (1988, 1993)
- Jan Hus Visiting Fellow at the Institute of Philosophy at the Academy of Sciences of the Czech Republic (1994 and 1996)
- Leverhulme Trust Research Fellowship (1998)
- Honorary Secretary of the Aristotelian Society (1993–2001)
- Gifford Lecturer at the University of Glasgow (2005)
- Past chairman of June Fourth, a human rights group concerned with China
- Honorary Associate of the National Secular Society
- Patron of the British Armed Forces Humanist Association (UKAFHA)
- Representative to the UN Human Rights Council for the International Humanist and Ethical Union
- Vice-president, British Humanist Association. In June 2011, it was announced that he had decided not to take up the position of President of the BHA.
- Member of the C1 World Dialogue group on relations between Islam and the West

== Publications ==
- An Introduction to Philosophical Logic (1982). ISBN 0-389-20299-1
- The Refutation of Scepticism (1985). ISBN 0-7156-1922-5
- Berkeley: The Central Arguments (1986). ISBN 0-7156-2065-7
- Wittgenstein (1988). ISBN 0-19-287676-7
  - Republished in 2001 as Wittgenstein: A Very Short Introduction. ISBN 0-19-285411-9
- with Susan Whitfield. China: A Literary Companion (1994). ISBN 0-7195-5353-9
- (ed). Philosophy: A Guide Through the Subject (1995). ISBN 0-19-875156-7
- Russell (1996). ISBN 0-19-287683-X
  - Republished in 2002 as Russell: A Very Short Introduction. ISBN 0-19-280258-5
- The Future of Moral Values (1997), ISBN 0-297-81973-9
- Philosophy 2: Further Through the Subject (1998). ISBN 0-19-875179-6, ed.
- The Quarrel of the Age: The Life and Times of William Hazlitt (2000). ISBN 0-297-64322-3
- The Meaning of Things: Applying Philosophy to Life (2001). ISBN 0-297-60758-8
  - published in the US as Meditations for the Humanist: Ethics for a Secular Age.
- The Reason of Things: Living with Philosophy (2002). ISBN 0-297-82935-1
  - published in the US as Life, Sex, and Ideas: The Good Life Without God.
- What Is Good?: The Search for the Best Way to Live (2003). ISBN 0-297-84132-7
- The Mystery of Things (2004). ISBN 0-297-64559-5
- The Art of Always Being Right (2004). ISBN 1-903933-61-7 [Edited T. Bailey Saunders' translation of Schopenhauer's essay The Art of Being Right]
- Descartes: The Life of René Descartes and Its Place in His Times (2005). ISBN 0-7432-3147-3
- The Heart of Things: Applying Philosophy to the 21st Century (2005). ISBN 0-297-84819-4
- The Form of Things: Essays on Life, Ideas and Liberty in the 21st Century (2006). ISBN 0-297-85167-5
- with Andrew Pyle and Naomi Goulder (eds). The Continuum Encyclopedia of British Philosophy (2006), ISBN 1-84371-141-9
- Grayling, Anthony Clifford (7 March 2006), Among the Dead Cities: The History and Moral Legacy of the WWII Bombing of Civilians in Germany and Japan, New York City: Walker & Co., OL 2628833W, Wikidata Q1219602
- with Mick Gordon. On Religion (2007).
- Against All Gods: Six Polemics on Religion and an Essay on Kindness (2007). ISBN 978-1-84002-728-0
- Truth, Meaning and Realism: Essays in the Philosophy of Thought (2007). ISBN 978-0-8264-9748-2
- Towards The Light (2007). ISBN 978-0-8027-1636-1
  - published in the US as Towards the Light of Liberty.
- The Choice of Hercules (2007).
- Scepticism and the Possibility of Knowledge (2008).
- Ideas That Matter: A Personal Guide for the 21st Century (2009). ISBN 978-0-297-85676-4
- Liberty in the Age of Terror : A Defence of Civil Society and Enlightenment Values (2009).
- To Set Prometheus Free: Essays on Religion, Reason and Humanity (2009). ISBN 978-1-84002-962-8
- Thinking of Answers: Questions in the Philosophy of Everyday Life (2010). ISBN 978-1-4088-0598-5
- The Good Book (2011). ISBN 978-0-8027-1737-5
- Friendship (2013). ISBN 978-0300175356
- The God Argument (2013). ISBN 978-1-62040-190-3
- Among the Dead Cities: Was the Allied Bombing of Civilians in WWII a Necessity or a Crime? (Bloomsbury edition; 2014). ISBN 0-7475-7671-8
- The Challenge of Things: Thinking Through Troubled Times (2015). ISBN 978-1-4088-6461-6
- The Age of Genius: The Seventeenth Century and the Birth of the Modern Mind (2016). ISBN 978-0747599425
- War: An Enquiry (2017). ISBN 978-0300175349
- Democracy and its Crisis (2018). ISBN 9781786072894
- The History of Philosophy (2019). ISBN 9780241304556
- The Good State: On the Principles of Democracy (2020). ISBN 9781786077189
- The Frontiers of Knowledge: What We Know About Science, History and The Mind (2021). ISBN 9780241304563
- For the Good of the World: Is Global Agreement on Global Challenges Possible? (2022). ISBN 9780861542666
- Who Owns the Moon?: In Defence of Humanity’s Common Interests in Space (2025). ISBN 9780861549153
- Discriminations: Making Peace in the Culture Wars (2025). ISBN 9780861549962

=== Foreword to other books ===
Foreword to Shyam Wuppuluri, N. C. A. da Costa (eds.), "Wittgensteinian (adj.): Looking at the World from the Viewpoint of Wittgenstein's Philosophy" Springer — The Frontiers Collection, 2019.
