= Impatiens johnsiana =

Scientific classification
- Kingdom: Plantae
- Clade: Tracheophytes
- Clade: Angiosperms
- Clade: Eudicots
- Clade: Asterids
- Order: Ericales
- Family: Balsaminaceae
- Genus: Impatiens
- Species: I. johnsiana

Binomial name
- Impatiens johnsiana Ratheesh, Sunil & Anil Kumar

Species of flowering plant

Impatiens johnsiana is a flowering plant species belonging to the family Balsaminaceae. It was discovered from Kattimattom Hills near Chembra Peak, Wayanad. The new plant has been named Impatiens johnsiana after John C. Jacob, who was popularly known as Johnci, an ardent naturalist who devoted his life to educate people on the need to conserve the biodiversity of the Western Ghats.

The plant is endemic to Western Ghats on densely clothed tree trunks in evergreen forests at an altitude of 1500-700 MSL.
