= Ann Wintle =

British geophysicist

- Born: 1948 (age 77–78); Hampshire, UK
- Education: University of Sussex (BS), University of Oxford (PhD)
- Spouse(s): J.A. Jacobs, m. 1982
- Scientific career
- Fields: Geophysics, Archaeology
- Workplaces: Aberystwyth University

Ann Grace Wintle is a British geophysicist and is the pioneer of luminescence dating, by increasing the precision of existing methods and maximum age of fossil the method is able to reliably date. She also set up the NERC luminescence dating facility in Aberystwyth, Wales.

== Early life and education ==
Wintle was born in 1948 in Hampshire. She studied physics at the University of Sussex in 1969. She also had a fondness for archaeology, for which she credits her mother and Sir Mortimer Wheeler’s TV and radio programmes. She combined both of these interests in her PhD from the University of Oxford.

== Career and research ==
After completing her studies, she completed a post-doctoral fellowship at Oxford and then spent two years at Simon Fraser University. In 1979, she moved to Cambridge, and in 1987 was a lecturer at Royal Holloway. She moved to Aberystwyth in 1989 where she was appointed to a personal chair in 1998. In 2000, she spent time at Uppsala University in Sweden as a guest professor.

Wintle became an Emeritus Professor at Aberystwyth University in the Department of Geography and Earth Sciences in 2001.

Her work focuses on luminescence dating, a field at the intersection of archaeology, geology and physics. She studies and applies techniques to date samples from sedimentary deposits containing minerals such as quartz or feldspars. This process is used in archaeology, to date traces of human activity or fossils, and in geology, to trace changes in climate conditions.

== Awards and honours ==
Wintle is an Honorary Member of the Quaternary Research Association and a Senior Fellow of the McDonald Institute for Archaeological Research in Cambridge University.

In 2008, she won the Institute of Physics Edward Appleton Medal and Prize for her outstanding contribution in the development and application of luminescence properties of minerals as a geological dating tool applicable to the past one million years.

In 2015, she was awarded the Liu Tungsheng Distinguished Career Medal For Distinguished Service To The International Community In Quaternary Science.

In 2018, she received the James Croll Medal from the Quaternary Research Association.

She has received Honorary Doctorates from the University of Uppsala in 2001, the University of Wollongong, Australia, in 2016 as well as the University of Sussex in 2019. She is recognised for her contributions to the development of the field of luminescence dating, for her collaborative work in establishing luminescence dating research laboratories around the world, and for her mentorship.
