= The Meaning of Things =

The Meaning of Things: Applying Philosophy to Life
- Author: A. C. Grayling
- Language: English
- Publisher: Weidenfeld & Nicolson
- Publication date: August 9, 2001
- Media type: Print
- Pages: 196
- ISBN: 978-0297607588

The Meaning of Things: Applying Philosophy to Life, published in the U.S. as Meditations for the Humanist: Ethics for a Secular Age, is a book by A. C. Grayling. First published in 2001, the work offers popular treatments of philosophical reasoning, weaving together ideas from various writers and traditions. It consists of short essays on a variety of subjects which, although deeply rooted in philosophy, are everyday phenomena encountered, recognized, and understood by everyone. The brief essays in the volume were originally published as installments in Grayling's "The Last Word" column in The Guardian.

== Contents ==
Part I: Virtues and Attributes
Moralising — Tolerance — Mercy — Civility — Compromise — Fear — Courage — Defeat — Sorrow — Death — Hope — Perseverance — Prudence — Frankness — Lying — Perjury — Betrayal — Loyalty — Blame — Punishment — Delusion — Love — Happiness

Part II: Foes and Fallacies
Nationalism — Racism — Speciesism — Hate — Revenge — Intemperance — Depression — Christianity — Sin — Repentance — Faith — Miracles — Prophecy — Virginity — Paganism — Blasphemy — Obscenity — Poverty — Capitalism

Part III: Amenities and Goods
Reason — Education — Excellence — Ambition — Acting — Art — Health — Leisure — Pace — Reading — Memory — History — Leadership — Travel — Privacy — Family — Age — Gifts — Trifles

== Quotations ==
- Defeat is always an opportunity, even when, as far too often happens, what is genuinely the better cause has been crushed by the worse. [...] But nothing happens without a lesson to offer, or without opening other routes into the future.
- Hatred [...] is dislike and antipathy inflamed to a high degree and inspired by beliefs which stimulate a set of other emotions in the hater, chief among them fear, ignorance, jealousy, anger and disgust. But note that all these emotions, and especially the first three, are about the hater; thus hating says more about haters than what they hate. It shows weakness, for it is a crude emotion which turns fears and anxieties outward to fix them on something else.
- What underlies talk of virginity is a profound and often hidden moral angst about purity and pollution—and therefore also sentiments of temptation and desire. If our religions had decided that ears or wisdom teeth were spiritually significant, we should feel the same anxieties regarding them as with the hymen; and moral concern would be devoted to them instead.

== Editions ==
The 2001 hardcover edition of The Meaning of Things was published by Weidenfeld & Nicolson. A paperback edition was published in 2002 by Phoenix, an imprint of the Orion Publishing Group. The American edition hardcover edition was published by Oxford University Press in 2002. Weidenfeld & Nicolson, also an imprint of Orion Publishing Group, published a paperback edition in 2002 and a Kindle edition in 2011.
