= Theos (think tank) =

UK public theology think tank

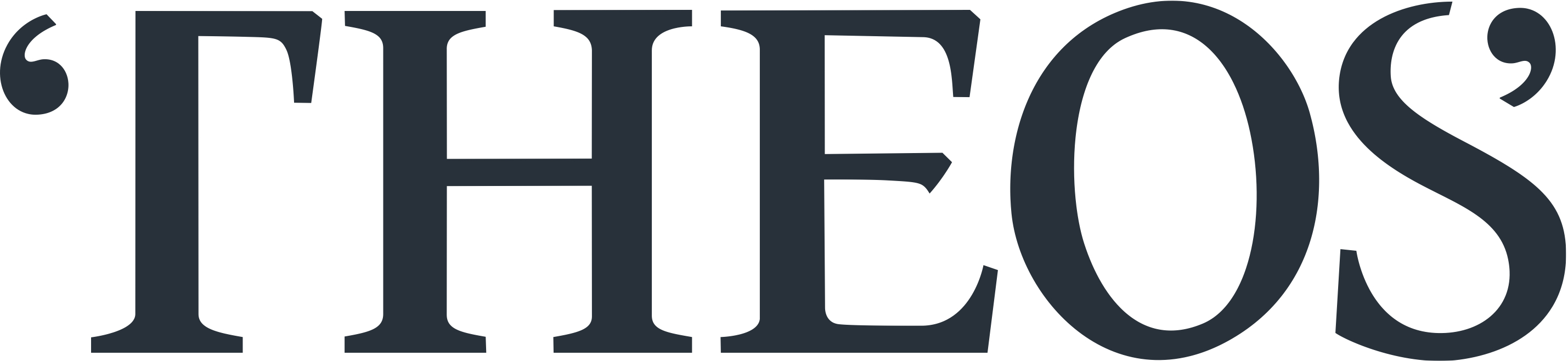
- Formation: 2006; 20 years ago
- Type: Think tank
- Legal status: Charity
- Location: Bloomsbury, London, UK
- Director: Chine McDonald
- Staff: 15
- Website: www.theosthinktank.co.uk

Theos (from the Greek: Θεός, theós, "God") is a Christian religion and society think tank researching the relationship between religion, politics and society in the contemporary world. Theos aims to impact opinion around issues of faith and belief in society through research, publications, media engagement, podcasts, animated videos, and events such as debates, seminars and lectures. Theos has its headquarters in the United Kingdom in Bloomsbury, London.

Theos maintains an ecumenical position, committed to the traditional creeds of the Christian faith. It also works with non-Christian and non-religious individuals and organisations.

== History ==
=== Early years: 2006–2011 ===
Theos was launched in November 2006 with the support of the then Archbishop of Canterbury, Rowan Williams, and the Roman Catholic Archbishop of Westminster, Cardinal Cormac Murphy-O'Connor. Its first director was Paul Woolley.

Theos believes that religion is a significant force in public life and should have an active role in public debate. The think tank argues that Christianity has played a seminal role in the formation of British, and Western, politics and ideas. Theos believes faith is "not just important for human flourishing and the renewal of society, but that society can only truly flourish if faith is given the space to do so".

Opposing the idea that politicians "don’t do God", as stated by Alastair Campbell in 2003, Theos' first research report was titled '"Doing God": A Future for Faith in the Public Space' and was published on 1 November 2006. Rowan Williams and Cormac Murphy O’Connor wrote the foreword to the report, stating that Theos encourages the "reassessment ... of the importance of faith to individuals and society ... by increasing public understanding of faith and its contribution to public life".

In its first years, the think tank produced reports on faith in areas of public life including sports, multiculturalism, Christmas, and politics. Its "Rescuing Darwin" project, which coincided with the 200th anniversary of Charles Darwin's birth, explored the extent and nature of evolutionary and non-evolutionary beliefs in the UK and their perceived relationship with theism and atheism. The project included an essay on Darwinism and theism in modern Britain, an extended interview with philosopher Mary Midgley, a "spiritual biography" of Charles Darwin, and two independent research studies conducted by polling company Savanta (then ComRes) and ethnographic social research agency ESRO. As part of the project, Theos commissioned the play "Mr Darwin's Tree" from the Christian playwright Murray Watts, to explore "Darwin's questions about his science, himself, God and suffering".

=== 2011–2021 ===
In 2011, Elizabeth Oldfield became the director of Theos, succeeding Paul Woolley. Under her leadership, Theos sought to promote informed and depolarised conversations about faith in society, with a focus on the belief that humans thrive in relationships of mutual dependence. Theos also expanded its network by collaborating with individuals from various fields, including academics, musicians, actors, and authors.

The think tank launched two ongoing podcasts, The Sacred and Reading Our Times, which serve as platforms for discussing faith and current issues.

During this period, Theos released reports on social issues, and on the topics of community, work, and social innovation. The research report "Religious London: Faith in a Global City", published in 2020, discussed the role of religion in public life.

=== 2022 onwards ===
Chine McDonald, a writer, broadcaster and public theologian, became the director of Theos in January 2022, succeeding Elizabeth Oldfield. Prior to this role, she worked as a journalist and held communications and fundraising roles in various organisations, including Christian Aid. McDonald is the author of the book God Is Not a White Man and regularly appears as a commentator on religion and ethics programmes, including as a presenter of BBC Radio 4's "Thought for the Day".

Since 2022, Theos has published works including "The Nones: Who are they and what do they believe?" and "A Torn Safety Net: How the Cost of Living Crisis Threatens Its Own Last Line of Defence", produced in partnership with the Church Urban Fund, with a joint foreword by former Archbishop of Canterbury Rowan Williams and former UK Prime Minister Gordon Brown.

In February 2025, regarding the Alliance for Responsible Citizenship conference in London, Nick Spencer of Theos said that while religion has been less significant in UK politics than in the USA, where over the past decade the Christian right is becoming more visible.

In March 2025, Theos announced results from a study for their podcast series "Motherhood vs The Machine." A survey had asked 2,298 participants about their stance on "growing a foetus entirely outside of a woman’s body." Only 21% of participants expressed support for the idea, while 52% opposed it. Religious individuals showed even lower levels of support, and women were less inclined to approve compared to men.

== Media ==
Theos has been featured in mainstream media outlets, including articles for publications UnHerd, The Guardian, The Economist, the Financial Times, Prospect, Yorkshire Post, Church Times, Christianity Today, and Comment Magazine. Senior Fellow Nick Spencer hosted a BBC Radio 4 series entitled The Secret History of Science and Religion. Additionally, Theos' work has been extensively quoted in media outlets, including The Washington Post, The New Statesman, The Telegraph, The Times, The Spectator, BBC, BBC 4, BBC 5, and multiple local BBC stations.

Nick Spencer's book, Magisteria: The Entangled Histories of Science & Religion, published in 2023, has received acclaim in New Scientist, Prospect, the Financial Times and the Times Literary Supplement.

The think tank has collaborated with animation director Emily Downe on several short animations on the topics of science and religion and on exploring the concept of 'worldviews', as well as for the think tank's podcast The Sacred.

== Criticism ==
British philosopher and author A.C. Grayling has been a critic of the organisation. In his book The God Argument: The Case Against Religion and for Humanism, published in 2013, Grayling devoted a chapter to criticising Theos and its research, arguing that the organisation was conservative and criticising it for what he saw as a lack of transparency in its funding, and for its association with conservative Christian organisations. Overall, Grayling's criticism of Theos was part of his wider argument for the separation of religion and state and the promotion of secular humanism as an alternative worldview.

== Podcasts ==
=== The Sacred ===
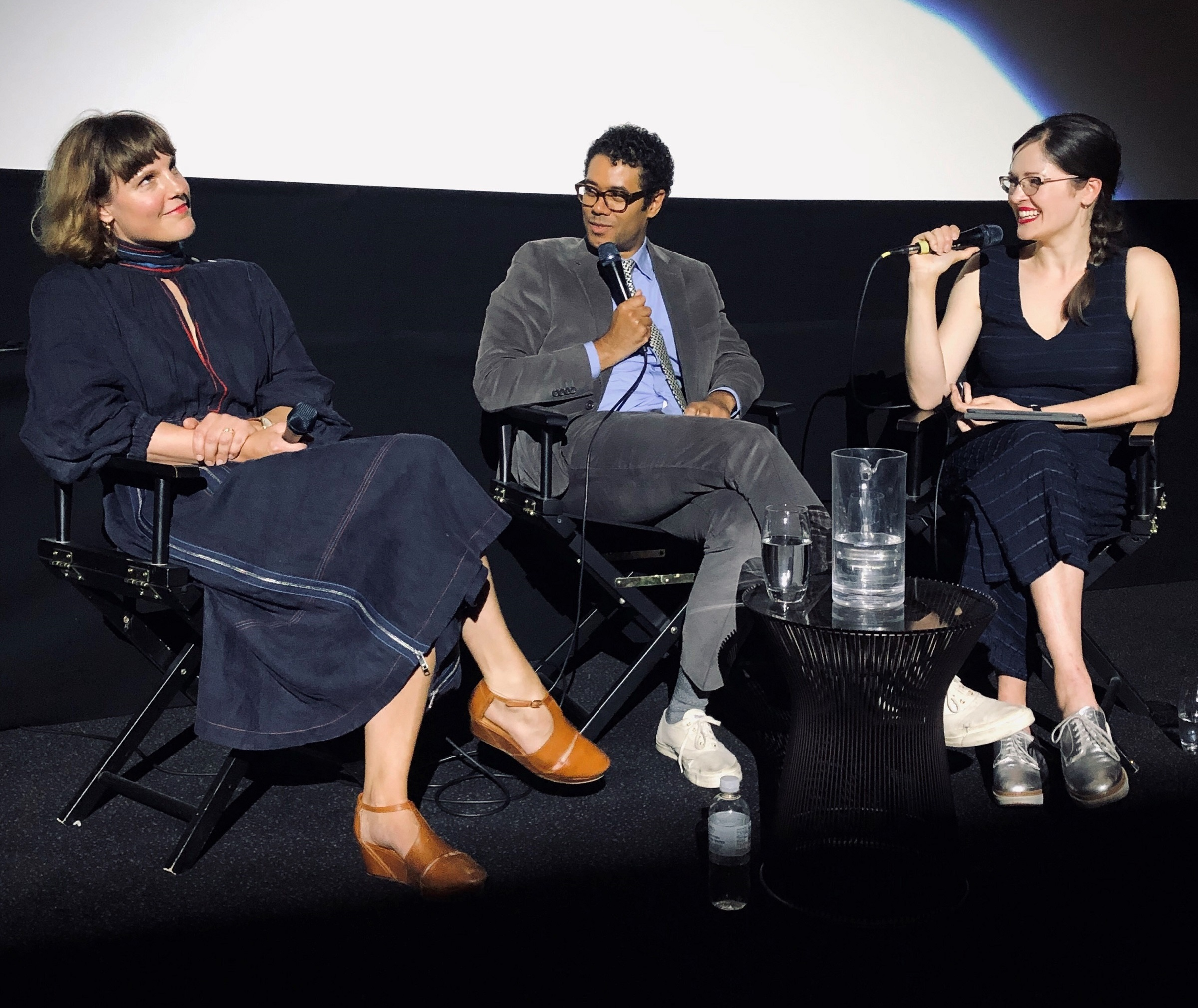
Live recording of The Sacred featuring Lydia Fox (left), Richard Ayoade (centre), and Elizabeth Oldfield (right), September 2019

The Sacred is a podcast produced by Theos and hosted by Elizabeth Oldfield, the former director of the think tank. The podcast explores the things people hold sacred in the broadest sense, including guests' deep principles or values to live by.

The podcast has been releasing episodes since late 2017 and has featured a range of guests from various backgrounds, including academics, journalists, actors, musicians, and politicians. Notable guests have included Justin Welby, Lord Charles Moore, Ash Sarkar, Rabbi Jonathan Sacks, Dame Prue Leith, Sally Phillips, Richard Ayoade, Nick Cave, and Rainn Wilson.

On 11 September 2019, Theos held a live podcast recording of The Sacred at Curzon Bloomsbury in London, featuring an interview with comedian Richard Ayoade and actress Lydia Fox. After a break during the COVID-19 pandemic, the podcast resumed its annual live podcast recordings in April 2023 with an interview featuring journalist Oliver Burkeman.

=== Reading Our Times ===
Reading Our Times is a podcast produced by Theos and hosted by Nick Spencer. The podcast aims to explore the books and ideas that are shaping contemporary society and thinking.The guests on the podcast are authors from across the Anglosphere, who discuss a range of issues with the host, including meritocracy, justice, populism, human rights, the brain, liberalism, and religion.

Guests who have appeared on the podcast include Thomas Piketty, Marilynne Robinson, Lord Jonathan Sumption, Michael Sandel, Margaret Macmillan, Charles Taylor, Minouche Shafik, Martin Rees, Rowan Williams, Iain McGilchrist, Maryanne Wolf, Alan Rusbridger, and Stefan Dercon.

== Annual lectures ==
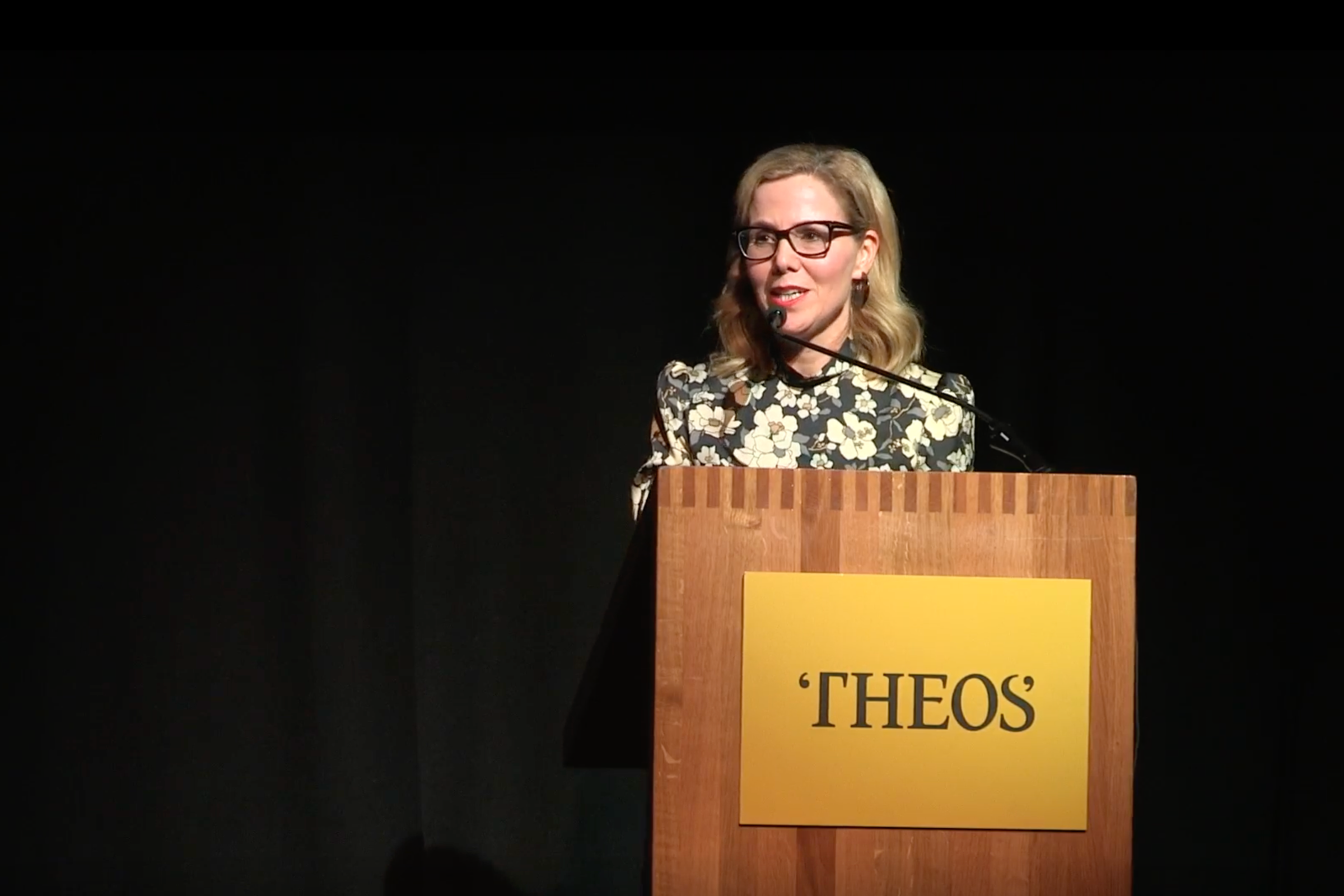
Sally Phillips delivering the 2019 Theos Annual lecture at King's Place, London

The think tank has held annual lectures in venues around London with British public figures since its third year of existence.

Speaker	Topic	Date and venue
Dr Kathryn Mannix	Dying for beginners: how understanding death can help us to live better	01/11/2023 at 1 Wimpole Street
Tom Holland	Humanism: a Christian heresy	23/11/2022 at Conway Hall
Dr Willie Jennings	Reimagining Western Education in a Time of Racial Crisis	10/11/2021 online
Prof Michael Sandel	The Tyranny of Merit	08/09/2020 online
Sally Phillips	Human Dignity, Different Lives & the Illusions of Choice	29/11/2019 at King’s Place
Michael Gove	When will there be a harvest for the world?	22/11/2018 at Institute of Directors
Tim Farron	What Kind of Liberal Society Do We Want?	28/11/2017 at The Law Society
Prof Terry Eagleton	The Death of God and the War on Terror	05/10/2016 at One Birdcage Walk
Baroness Onora O’Neill	Freedom of religion and freedom of expression	19/10/2015 at the Inner Temple
Prof Will Hutton	How Good We Could Be: Morality, Economics and the Future of Britain	24/11/2014 at The Stationers Hall
Rt Revd. Rt Hon Prof Rowan Williams	The Person and the Individual: Human Dignity, Human Relationships and Human Limits	01/10/2012 at Methodist Central Hall
General Lord Richard Dannatt	The Battle for Hearts and Minds: Morality and Warfare Today	08/11/2011 at One Birdcage Walk
Baron Ian Blair	Religion and Public Order	16/11/2010 at One Birdcage Walk
Baron Jonathan Sacks	Religion in Twenty–first century Britain	04/11/2009 at Lewis Media Centre
Mark Thompson	Faith, Morality and Media	14/10/2008 at Lewis Media Centre

== Publications ==
=== Books ===
Books published by Theos staff members
Author	Year	Title	Link
Nicholas Spencer	2023	Magisteria: The Entangled Histories of Science and Religion	
Madeleine Pennington	2021	Quakers, Christ and the Enlightenment	
Chine McDonald	2021	God Is Not a White Man: And Other Revelations	
Simon Perfect	2021	Freedom of Speech in Universities: Islam, Charities and Counter–terrorism	
Nathan Mladin	2021	“The question of surveillance capitalism” in The Robot Will See You Now: Artificial Intelligence and the Christian Faith, eds. John Wyatt and Stephen N. Williams	
Ben Ryan	2019	How the West was Lost: The Decline of a Myth and the Search for New Stories	
Madeleine Pennington	2019	The Christian Quaker: George Keith and the Keithian Controversy	
Ben Ryan	2018	Fortress Britain? Ethical approaches to immigration policy for a post-Brexit Britain	
Theos Team	2017	The Mighty and the Almighty: How Political Leaders Do God, ed. Nick Spencer	
Nick Spencer	2017	The Political Samaritan: How Power Hijacked a Parable	
Nick Spencer	2016	The Evolution of the West: How Christianity Shaped Our Values	
Nick Spencer	2014	Atheists: The Origin of the Species	
Nick Spencer	2009	Darwin and God	

== Funding ==
Theos, though editorially independent, is a project of the British and Foreign Bible Society, which provides some core funding. The think tank does not receive any funding from the government, corporations or religious denominations, except when conducting consultancy research for them. Theos relies on regular donations from individuals, and its published research is often funded by charitable trusts, such as the William Leech Research Fellowships, the Halley Stewart Trust, Laing Family Trusts and Sainsbury Family Charitable Trusts. The Annual Lecture of the think tank is currently sponsored by CCLA, an investment fund for charities, churches and the public sector, which is owned by its clients.
