= Church of the Advent (Boston) =

- The church in 2019
- Church of the Advent
- 42°21′28″N 71°04′17″W
- Location: Boston, Massachusetts
- Country: United States
- Denomination: Episcopal Church
- Tradition: Anglo-Catholic
- Website: theadventboston.org

History
- Status: Parish church
- Founded: 1844 (parish)
- Consecrated: December 1, 1894

Architecture
- Functional status: Active
- Architect: John Hubbard Sturgis
- Style: English Gothic Revival
- Years built: 1879-1888 (present building)

Administration
- Diocese: Massachusetts

Clergy
- Rector: The Very Reverend Canon Alistair Macdonald-Radcliff

The Church of the Advent is an Episcopal parish in Boston, Massachusetts, United States. The church is housed in a Victorian Gothic building, faced in brick with eight large change ringing bells and a 172-foot spire. It is well known as a prominent center of Anglo-Catholic worship. The church reported 803 members in 2015 and 517 members in 2023; no membership statistics were reported in 2024 parochial reports. Plate and pledge income reported for the congregation in 2024 was $402,250 with average Sunday attendance (ASA) of 176 persons.

== Location ==
The church building is located at 30 Brimmer Street at the corner of Mount Vernon and Brimmer Streets on the "flat" of Beacon Hill. It is next door to the historic Charles Street Meeting House.

== History ==
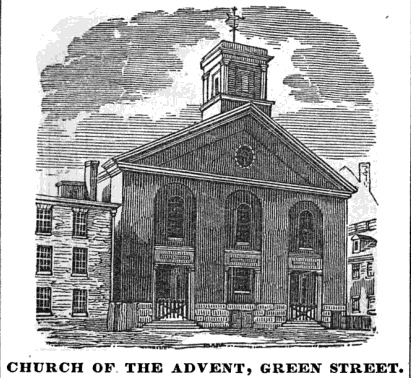
The parish's 1851 home was on Green Street in the since-demolished West End.

The church was begun in 1844 by a group who wished to implement the ideals of the new Oxford Movement, then about a decade old in England. The founders defied the widespread custom of renting pews, whereby those who had the means leased the best seats, often from generation to generation. Servants and the poor were relegated to places in the back or in the galleries. Such pew rents provided income for churches but also effectively excluded those who could not afford them, thereby enforcing social distinctions contrary to the essential nature of Christianity. Founders wrote in the parish charter that their intention was "to secure to a portion of the City of Boston the ministrations of the Holy Catholic Church, and more especially to secure the same to the poor and needy, in a manner free from unnecessary expense and all ungracious circumstances."

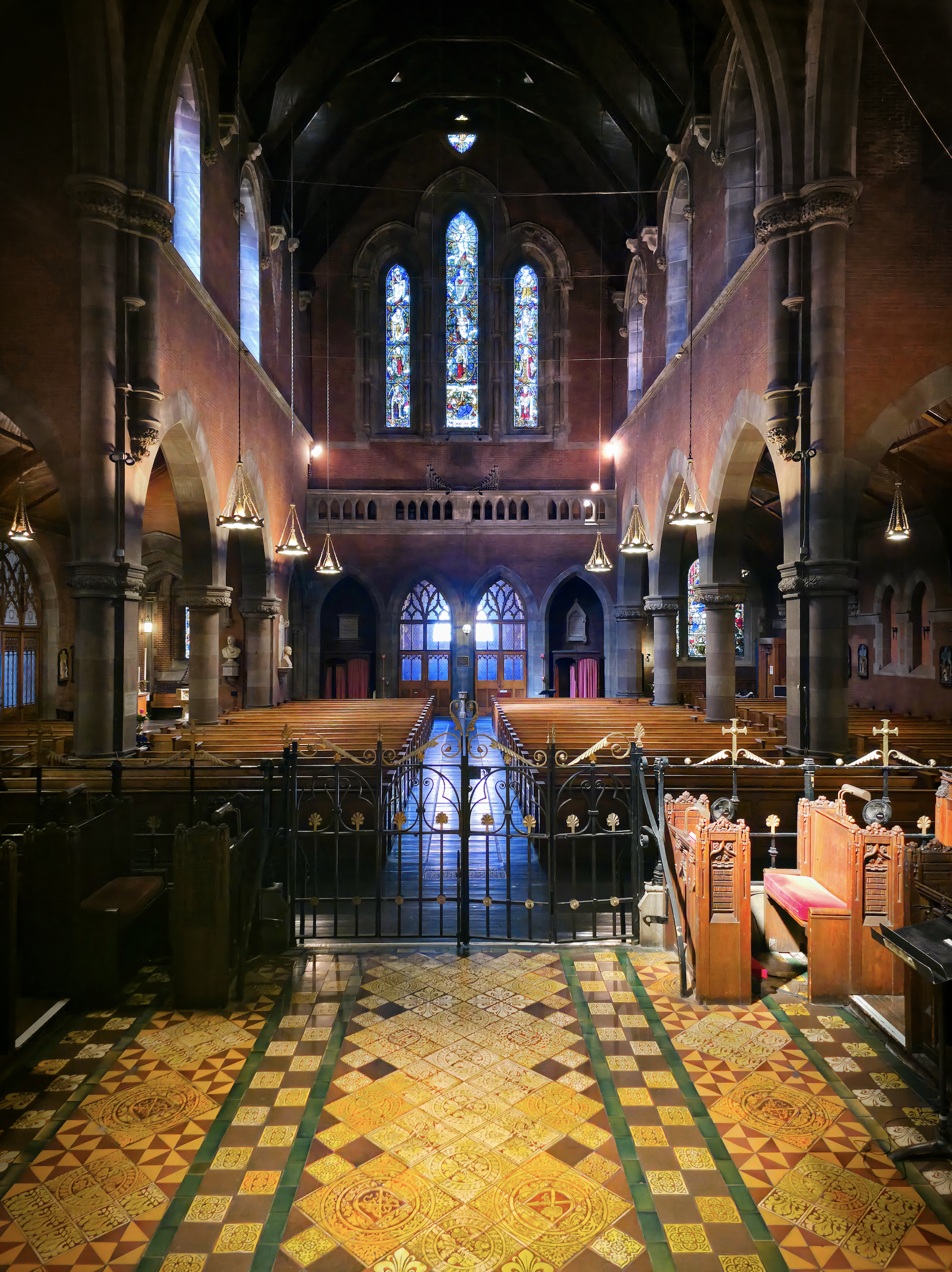
View from the chancel into the nave

In 1872, Charles Chapman Grafton became the Advent's fourth rector. It was during his tenure that construction began on the parish's permanent home, the Gothic Revival structure on Brimmer Street on the "flat" of Beacon Hill. Previously the congregation had moved from its first meeting space, an "upper room" in a building on Merrimack Street, to rented space in a building near Causeway Street, and later to a church on Green Street in Boston's since-demolished West End. From it moved to a disused Congregational church on Bowdoin Street on the other side of the Hill.(This building served as the Church of St. John the Evangelist until 2015.) Father Grafton was elected bishop of the Diocese of Fond du Lac, Wisconsin, in 1888 but returned in 1894 to preach and consecrate the completed Brimmer Street church on Advent Sunday, December 1 – fifty years to the day after the parish's first services in the North End loft.

In 1936, parishioner and master organ-builder, G. Donald Harrison of the Aeolian-Skinner Company, designed and installed a pipe organ which remains a world-renowned masterpiece of the art.

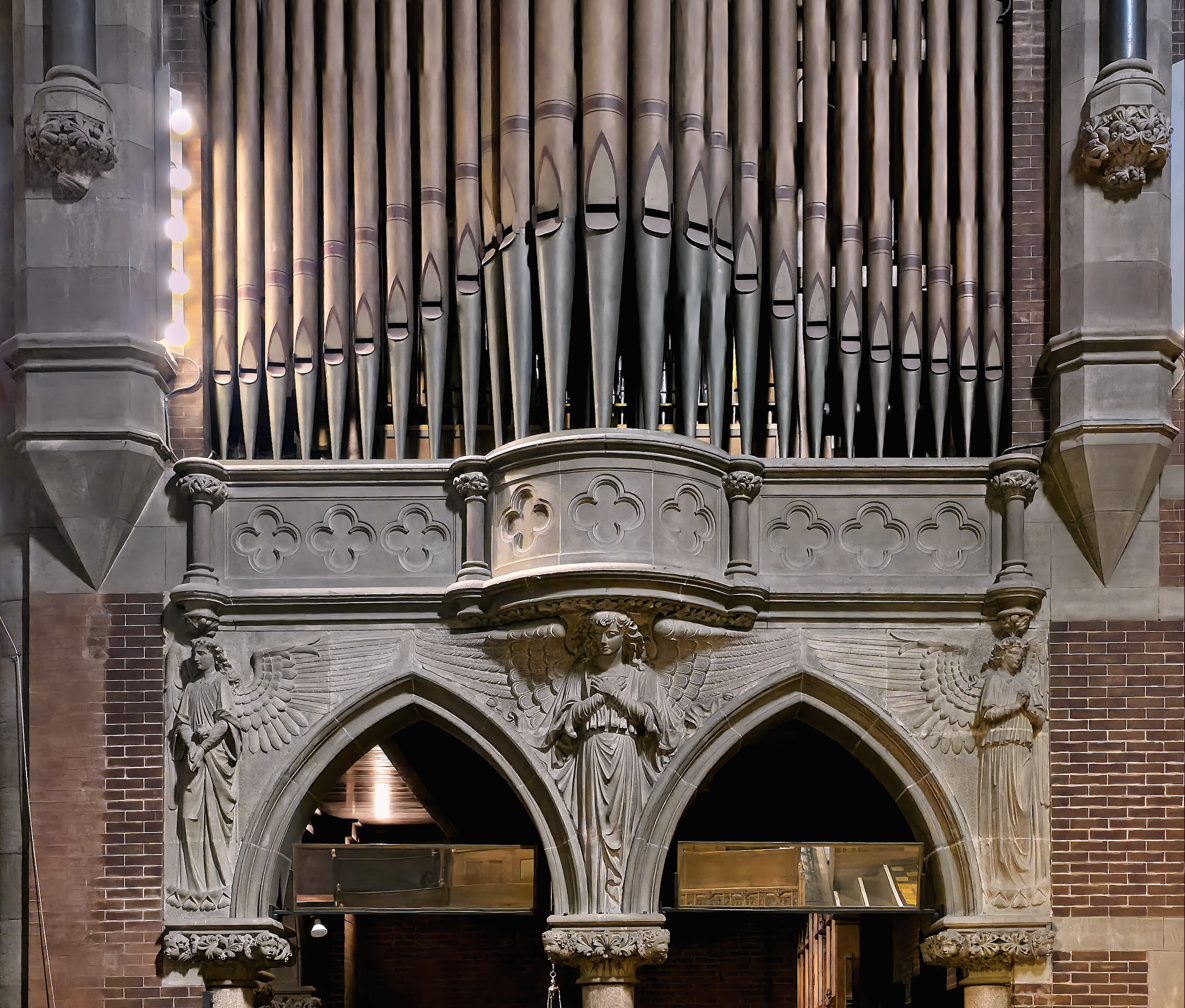
Organ built by Aeolian-Skinner Company

In 1965, parishioner and seminarian Jonathan Daniels, died in Alabama during the Civil Rights Movement.

Also of note is the parish's thirteenth pastor, Richard Holloway, who subsequently became Bishop of Edinburgh and Primus of the Scottish Episcopal Church.
