= Professor of Geophysics (Cambridge) =

The Professorship of Geophysics is a statutory professorship at the University of Cambridge. It was founded in 1964.

The professorship was established in the Department of Geodesy and Geophysics (now part of the Department of Earth Sciences. The first incumbent was Sir Edward Bullard, who was appointed to the chair in 1964.

== Professors of Geophysics ==
- Edward Bullard (1964)
- Jack Jacobs (1974)
- Chris Chapman (1984)
- Bob White (1989)
- Sergei Lebedev (2021)
