= Among the Dead Cities =

2006 book by Anthony Grayling

Among the Dead Cities The History and Moral Legacy of the WWII Bombing of Civilians in Germany and Japan
- Author: A. C. Grayling
- Subject: Ethics, military history
- Publisher: Walker Books
- Publication date: 7 March 2006; 20 years ago
- Media type: Print
- Pages: 384 pp (hardcover)
- ISBN: 0802714714
- OCLC: 62741565

Among the Dead Cities: The History and Moral Legacy of the WWII Bombing of Civilians in Germany and Japan (later released as Among the Dead Cities: Was the Allied Bombing of Civilians in WWII a Necessity or a Crime?) is a 2006 book by British philosopher A. C. Grayling in which he said that although World War II was a just and necessary war, the area bombing done to defeat Germany was a crime (unlike the American precision bombing or "pinpoint bombing" of industrial and military targets) because it was (1) an intentional attack on non-combatants; (2) unnecessary in defeating Germany; and (3) disproportionate. Responses were divided.

== Reception ==
John Charmley of The Guardian wrote that "its extremely sophisticated argument lends itself to being immediately misunderstood by those of a less liberal frame of mind" and that Grayling anticipates all the criticisms of historians and right-leaning readers. Stressing that the philosopher critiques area bombing rather than bombing itself, Charmley said Grayling "outlines his argument carefully". He billed the book as "provocative and readable", arguing,

Unless we exercise vigilance over our leaders, they will fall for the tempting arguments that lead to area bombing, or its modern equivalent. Books like this should be compulsory reading for all senior politicians.

Christopher J. Eberle wrote in Ethics that the five chapters on the "Bomber War" itself, the motivations behind it, and the public criticism "make for captivating, if disturbing and depressing, reading", but that Grayling's factual narrative had been disputed by writers other than the reviewer. However, Eberle claimed the argument against the area bombing "covers no new ground (that I can espy) regarding the normative criteria we should employ". He said that Grayling argues well that area bombing was unnecessary, but is less persuasive in arguing that area bombing violated the principles of non-combatant immunity and proportionality. Still, Eberle concluded that Among the Dead Cities,

synthesizes a large amount of technical information [...], does so in a way that renders salient many morally important issues raised by the area bombing campaign, and that reaches sensible moral verdicts.

In The Journal of Military History, Binoy Kampmark called the book's eight chapters "neatly written". However, he described the account of just-war theory in the sixth chapter as "rather haphazardly compiled". Kampmark also said that Grayling overall answers his questions less than satisfactorily, arguing that the tribunals at Nuremberg and Tokyo were wise to "[make] neat omissions about area bombing in their judgment [...] The Axis powers started it".

David Cesarani of The Independent stated that "Grayling has a shaky grasp of the wider military context", noting that targets in precision bombing were potently defended and that the RAF doing precision bombing would possibly have allowed Hitler to divert critical resources. Cesarani speculated, "If the Germans had been able to ring the [Normandy] beaches with 500 more, [...] the war might have turned out rather differently." He dismissed it as "a spirited and readable polemic rather than an objective study. It shows that military history is too serious a business to be left to moral philosophers."

The Daily Telegraph's Max Hastings said the author "rehearses familiar history" and is new only in "the absolutism of his conclusions", which he felt differed from those of "more cautious historians". Arguing that the area bombing was done to hasten collapse of tyrannies whereas the Nazis were deep defenders of an immoral ideology, Hastings said Grayling excessively engages in presentism and adds "little useful to the debate".
