= Edward Bullard =

British geophysicist (1907–1980)

Sir Edward Bullard
- Bullard in 1941
- Born: 21 September 1907; Norwich, Norfolk, England
- Died: 3 April 1980 (aged 72); La Jolla, California. United States
- Education: University of Cambridge
- Known for: Dynamo theory
- Awards: Hughes Medal (1953); The Chree Medal and Prize (1957); Gold Medal of the Royal Astronomical Society; Fellow of the Royal Society; Wollaston Medal (1967); Vetlesen Prize (1968); Royal Medal (1975); William Bowie Medal (1975); Maurice Ewing Medal (1978)
- Scientific career
- Fields: Geophysics
- Workplaces: British Admiralty, National Physical Laboratory, University of Cambridge
- Thesis: 1. Electron scattering. 2. Pendulum Observations. (1932)
- Doctoral advisor: Patrick Blackett
- Doctoral students: Thomas Gaskell; Harvey Gellman; Robert Ladislav Parker; Nigel Weiss

5th Director of NPL
- In office 1948–1955
- Preceded by: Edward Victor Appleton (Acting)
- Succeeded by: Reginald Leslie Smith-Rose (Acting)

Sir Edward Crisp Bullard FRS (21 September 1907 – 3 April 1980) was a British geophysicist who is considered, along with Maurice Ewing, to have founded the discipline of marine geophysics. He developed the theory of the geodynamo, pioneered the use of seismology to study the sea floor, measured geothermal heat flow through the ocean crust, and found new evidence for the theory of continental drift.

== Early life ==
Bullard was born into a wealthy brewing family in Norwich, England. His maternal grandfather was Sir Frank Crisp and his paternal grandfather was Sir Harry Bullard, who had been an MP for Norwich. He was educated at Norwich School and later studied Natural Sciences at Clare College, Cambridge. He studied under Ernest Rutherford at the Cavendish Laboratory of University of Cambridge and in the 1930s he received his PhD degree as a nuclear physicist.

Bullard found poor career prospects for nuclear physicists during the Great Slump, so in 1931 he switched fields to take a job as demonstrator in the department of geodesy and geophysics at Cambridge. The department had been founded in 1921 when it consisted of only one person, Sir Gerald Lenox-Conyngham. By 1931 Lenox-Conyngham had persuaded the university that he needed additional staff, so had been given funds for a junior post. Bullard was appointed to this position on the recommendation of Rutherford. At the same time Harold Jeffreys was appointed reader in geophysics. Over the next eight years, these three researchers made numerous advances in geophysics.

During World War II, he was an experimental officer at HMS Vernon of the Admiralty Mining Establishment with Francis Crick, Thomas Gaskell and Robert Boyd, working on the development of degaussing techniques to protect shipping from magnetic mines.

== Career ==
Bullard held a chair at the University of Toronto from 1948 to 1950 and was head of the National Physical Laboratory between 1950 and 1955. He was knighted in the 1953 Coronation Honours List. He returned to Cambridge in 1955, first as an assistant in research, then as a reader and finally to a chair created for him in 1964. He was a founding fellow of Churchill College, Cambridge.

Bullard became one of the most important geophysicists of his day. He also did studies of the ocean floor, even though he suffered from seasickness and could rarely take scientific trips on the ocean. He was important to dynamo theory, hence his most important work concerned the source of the Earth's magnetic field. He was often frustrated by efforts to increase geophysical interest at the University of Cambridge. In his career he won the Hughes Medal, the Vetlesen Prize and the Gold Medal of the Royal Astronomical Society. He was elected to the American Academy of Arts and Sciences in 1954. In 1965, he was awarded the Alexander Agassiz Medal from the National Academy of Sciences, of which he was a member, for his significant investigations of the earth from its surface to its core. He was elected to the American Philosophical Society in 1969.

Then during the early 1960s Bullard and his associates, J.E. Everett and Alan Gilbert Smith, used a computer to try to fit all of the continents together. Instead of using the shorelines, as other geophysicists had done, he used a depth of 914 meters (3000 ft) below sea level. This depth corresponds to about halfway between the shoreline and the ocean basins and represents the true edge of the continents. By doing this he discovered a near perfect fit among the continents put together. With this discovery he helped further the idea of a supercontinent that an earlier geophysicist, Alfred Wegener, had suggested calling Pangaea. It turned out a posteriori that a very similar result had been published thirty years earlier by the French geologist Boris Choubert, but this work published in French in a francophone journal of low international influence had remained virtually unknown.

After retiring from Cambridge in 1974 he settled to a position at the University of California, San Diego. Bullard died in La Jolla, California, in 1980. His papers are held by the Churchill Archives Centre.

== See also ==
- List of geophysicists

Academic offices
Preceded by Established for Sir Edward Bullard by grace of 20 May 1964	Professor of Geophysics, University of Cambridge; 1964-1974	Succeeded by J.A. Jacobs
