= Elizabeth Oldfield (podcaster) =

British podcaster & author (born 1983/84)

- Born: 1983 or 1984 (age 42–43)
- Occupations: Christian podcaster and author
- Known for: The Sacred podcast and Fully Alive book
- Website: https://www.elizabetholdfield.com/

Elizabeth Oldfield is a British podcaster and author.

== Career ==
Oldfield has a degree in English and history.

She worked as a journalist at the BBC, and was Director of Theos, a religious thinktank, for ten years.

== Podcaster ==
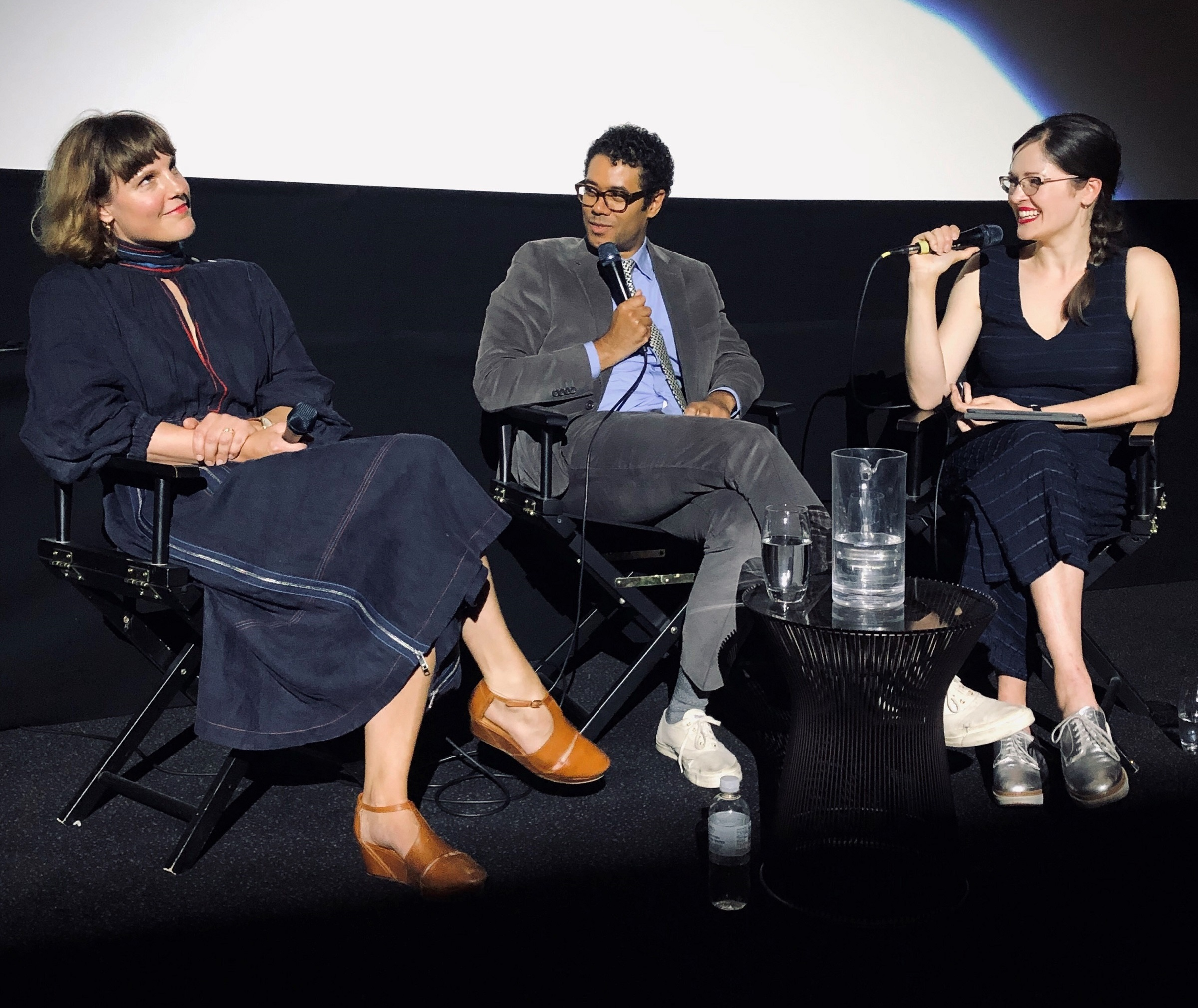
Live recording of The Sacred featuring Lydia Fox (left), Richard Ayoade (centre), and Elizabeth Oldfield (right), September 2019

She is the host of The Sacred podcast since 2017. Explaining its purpose in Church Times, Oldfield quoted Barack Obama: "If you listen hard enough, everybody’s got a sacred story . . . How did they come to believe what they believe?" She said that this story becomes a glue that perhaps can "mend our broken common life".

== Author ==
She is the author of the book Fully Alive: Tending to the Soul in Turbulent Times (ISBN 9781493446971, Hodder/Brazos, 2024). The title is from a quotation of St Irenaeus: "The glory of God is a human being fully alive". Anglican priest and poet Rachel Mann describes the book as "part spiritual memoir and part self-help manual". Mann commends the book to those who appreciated Unapologetic by Francis Spufford, those who "can’t quite give up on the Song of Love despite all the evidence to the contrary". Anglican pastor Aaron Damiani describes the book as a "lively conversation with poets, social scientists, cultural critics, philosophers, and psychologists".

Oldfield considers that Spufford's Unapologetic changed the debate about religion and science introduced by New Atheism in the 2000s. According to Oldfield, Unapologetic shifted the discussion from being about the Big Bang, Biblical criticism, and proofs of God and into the area of feelings: "for almost all of us, that’s what drives not just our metaphysics, but most of our deepest decisions".

== Personal life ==
Oldfield is married to Chris, a philosopher. Their two children are a boy and a girl. She and her husband are committed Christians. Since December 2020, she and her family live in an intentional Christian community in London.
