= Boris Choubert =

Russian-French geologist (1906–1983)

- Boris Schuberth
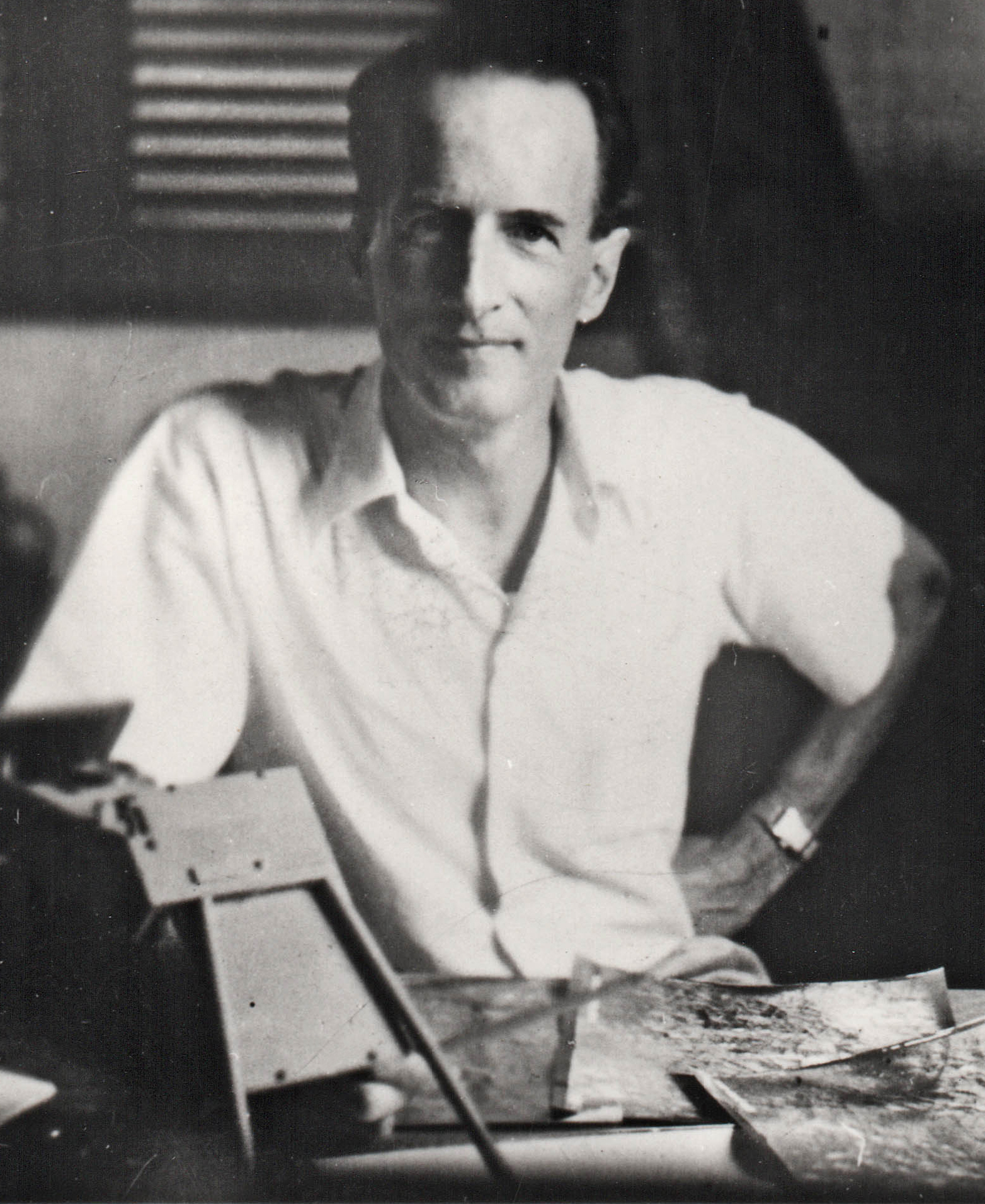
- Boris Choubert in French Guiana (around 1950).
- Born: 1906; Saint Petersburg, Russia
- Died: December 3, 1983 (aged 76–77); Nice, France
- Known for: First reconstruction of the pre-Atlantic paleocontinent
- Scientific career
- Thesis: Étude géologique des terrains anciens du Gabon (Geologic study of ancient Gabon terrains) (1937)

Boris Choubert or Schuberth (1906 − December 3, 1983) was a Russian-French geologist. An adept of Wegener's theory, he was the first to precisely reconstruct the layout of the continental masses of Africa, America, Europe and Greenland prior to the fragmentation of Pangaea, thirty years before the article generally credited for this discovery.

== Biography ==
Of Russian origin, Boris Schuberth, better known as Choubert (Note: Boris Schuberth kept his family name across his whole life but with adding « said Choubert », and he signed his scientific writings as Boris Choubert. His younger brother Georges, a geologist in Marocco, did change his family name to Choubert, and transmitted it to his offspring.) was born in Saint Petersburg in 1906. He left Russia for Finland in 1917, then for France in 1927. He studied geology at La Sorbonne for two years, then at the Institut de géologie appliquée (now École nationale supérieure de géologie) in Nancy, where he received his diploma of engineer-geologist. (Note: A student of 1930 class, Boris Choubert served as the President of the Association des ingénieurs de l'ENSG Nancy from 1961 to 1964.)

In 1933 he was employed by the Government of Gabon (then a subdivision of French Equatorial Africa). In 1937 he defended his thesis on Étude géologique des terrains anciens du Gabon (Geologic study of ancient Gabon terrains).

In 1946 he was hired by the Office de recherche scientifique d'outre-mer (presently IRD) and left for French Guiana. In 1949 he founded a multidisciplinary research organization which would become the Institut de l'Amérique tropicale française (Institute of the French tropical America) in 1954, then the Guyana office of ORSTOM in 1964. At the end of his stay he was inspecteur général de l'ORSTOM and the head of Bureau de recherches géologiques de la Guyane.

In 1960 he came back to continental France. In 1961 he joined the CNRS as a directeur de recherche, then the École des mines de Paris, where he stayed until his retirement in 1976. He then moved to Nice, where he was harboured by the laboratoire de géologie. He died in Nice on December 3, 1983.

== Scientific studies ==
Boris Choubert mainly dedicated himself to three geological fields, of which he significantly advanced the first two:

- prospecting and mining geology;
- geological mapping and structural geology;
- igneous petrology.

=== Mining geology ===
- In Gabon in 1934 Boris Choubert discovered the characteristic minerals, manganite and rhodochrosite, of a huge manganese deposit, which holds a quarter of all world reserves. (Note: This deposit has been exploited since 1962, and produces today about 4 Mt/a of ore.)
- In 1939 he discovered the first diamonds in the alluvial deposits of the Ikoy River basin, near Lambaréné (Estuaire Province, Gabon). He would show later that these deposits are of secondary origin, and that these diamonds come in fact from kimberlites, the same as those from South Africa.
- In Guyane he realized a detailed study of the gold mines of Saint-Élie and A Dieu Vat, and already drew attention to the problems generated by placer mining.

=== Geological mapping ===
- Boris Choubert achieved, alone or in collaboration, a great number of geological maps at various scales, from mine plans at 1/4,000 to a global tectonic map at 1/10,000,000, with a particular attention at the magmatic and metamorphic rocks of ancient formations.
- In 1935 he published a very important paper where he reconstructs Paleozoic and Precambrian ranges, and deduces the past existence and contours of the paleocontinent that predated the Atlantic Ocean opening.
- In French Guiana he tackles the geological map of the territory (88,000 km^{2}) at 1/500,000 scale, a map published in 1949 then, with more details, in 1960.

== Boris Choubert and continental drift ==
=== Continental drift in 1935 ===
Evoked several times between 1596 and 1908, the continental drift concept was chiefly developed and advocated by the German meteorologist Alfred Wegener between 1912 et 1929, on the basis of different criteria, morphological (the nesting of continent shapes, like the Horn of Brazil and the Gulf of Guinea), stratigraphic (stratigraphic continuity between Africa and South America, and complementarity of Paleozoic cratons), paleoclimatic (similarity of Paleozoic striated pebbles of South Africa and South America) and paleontological (same fauna and flora during the Paleozoic era).

Wegener's studies obtained but limited success among the geological and geophysical community, for a number of reasons: in part because for every isolated argument one could appeal to coincidence or find some other explanation, but above all because the mechanisms that Wegener invoked as driving drift did not hold water. (Note: Perhaps because himself was no geologist or geophysicist, too.)

Boris Choubert was aware of studies by the South-African geologist Alexander du Toit, who had evidenced the great similarity of ancient South-American, West-African and South-African formations and was a supporter of Wegener's theory. Working on rocks from Gabon, Congo and Brazil, Boris Choubert confirmed the findings of du Toit and in turn became a fervent supporter of continental drift.

=== Reconstruction of the pre-Atlantic paleocontinent ===
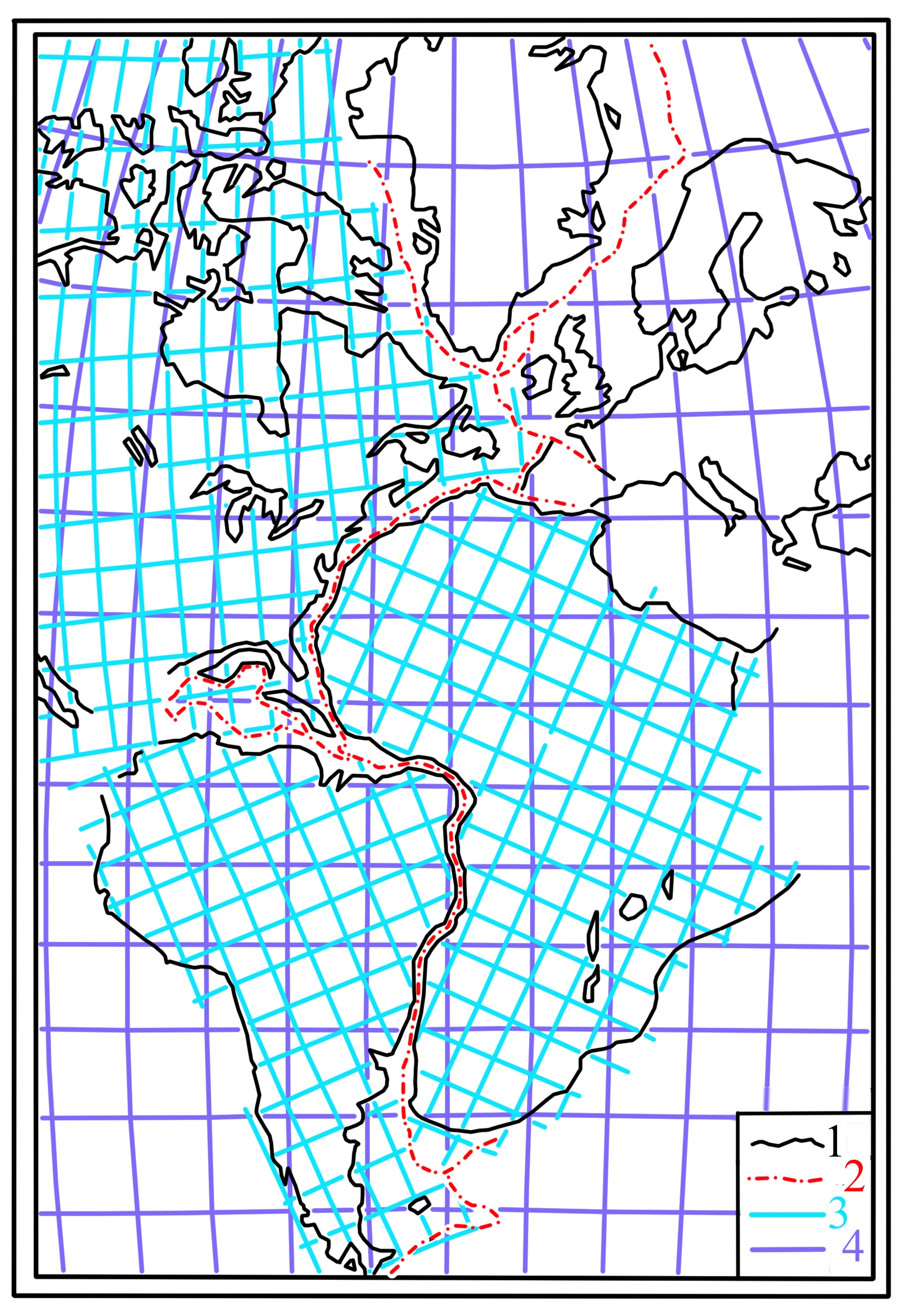
Boris Choubert's reconstruction of the America-Greenland-Europe-Africa supercontinent (1935).

Boris Choubert published in 1935 a reconstruction of the relative positions of America, Africa and Europe before the Triassic. This reconstitution was much more precise than the previous proposals by Wegener and du Toit, essentially because Choubert, instead of using coastlines, based his reconstitution on the 1000-m isobath, a much better representation of the limits of continental blocks.

That excellent fit was more convincing a proof of continental drift than previous attempts, which left a large gap between Africa and South America. For his reconstruction Boris Choubert dared for the first time the idea that the Iberian Peninsula suffered, after the Triassic, a rotation with respect to the rest of Europe. He also swept the Mid-Atlantic Ridge problem by explaining that it formed posteriorly to Atlantic Ocean opening. The Caribbean Sea does not fit as well as the rest but, as it is known today, it was seriously affected by Cenozoic tectonics.

Boris Choubert drew the theory farther than Wegener, who had only considered post-Triassic continental drift. By reconstructing the Paleozoic mountain ranges across the Atlantic (Caledonian range, Hercynian range et Appalachians), he made clear that they were formed by the compression of sediments that had been accumulated between three Precambrian cratons (Canadian Shield and Fennoscandian Shield at north, Gondwana at south). Withdrawing those ranges he concluded that the three cratons had made a single continent at the end of the Precambrian, which was later fragmented during the Paleozoic. Hence he realized that continental drift is a general process, which has affected the Earth all along its geological history.

=== The fit by Bullard, Everett and Smith ===
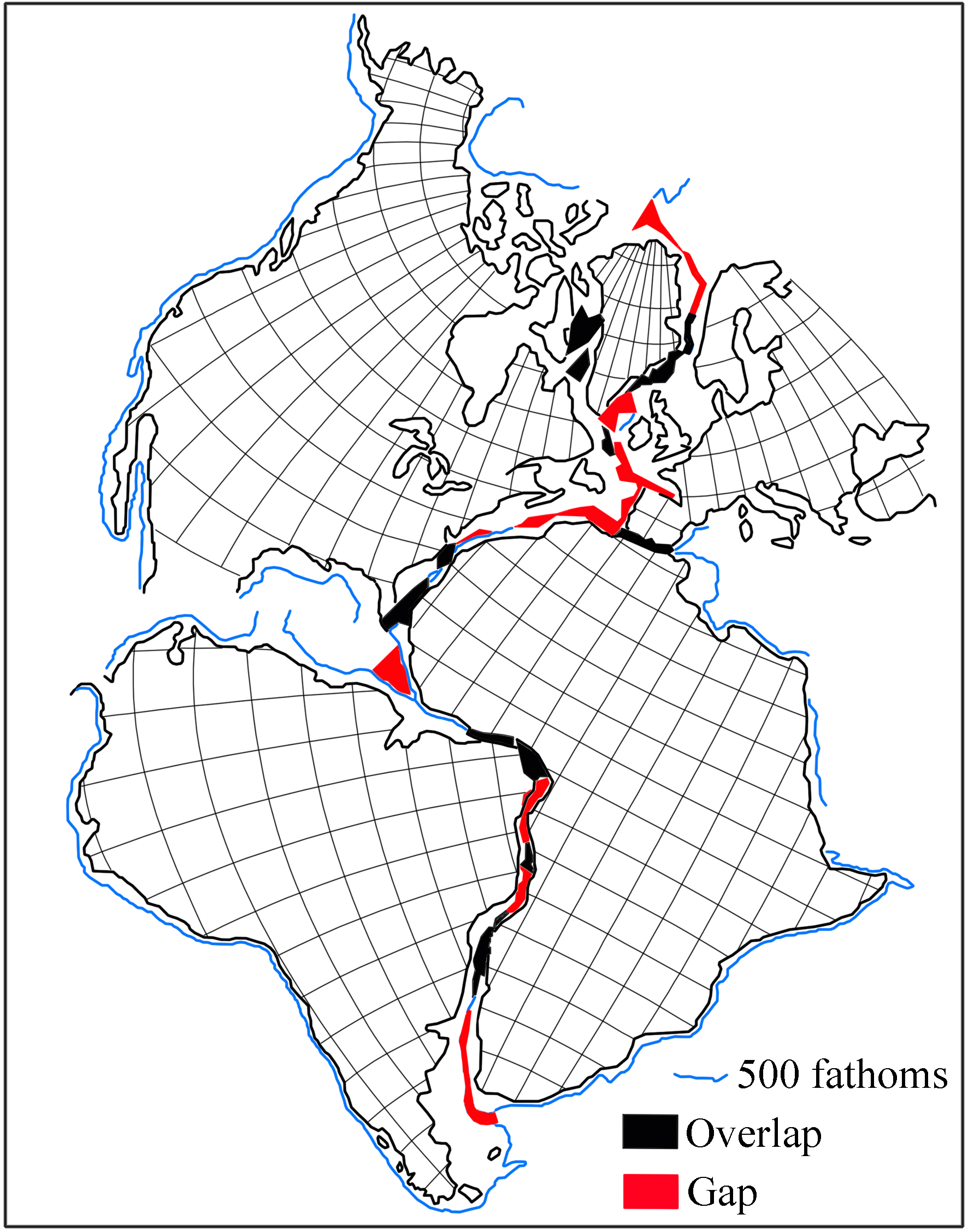
Reconstruction by Bullard et al. of the America-Greenland-Europe-Africa supercontinent (1965).

Thirty years later, Edward Bullard and co-authors published a paper in which a reconstruction similar to Choubert's was achieved with the help of a computer, through the numerical minimisation of distances between continental blocks. This paper rapidly acquired a great reputation among the scientific community, whereas Choubert's work had remained almost unnoticed (and it is even not cited in Bullard et al.'s paper).

== See also ==
- Continental drift
