= Bob White (geophysicist) =

Geophysicist

Robert (Bob) Stephen White (born 12 December 1952) is Emeritus Professor of Geophysics in the Earth Sciences department at Cambridge University and was elected a Fellow of the Royal Society (FRS) in 1994. He is Director of the Faraday Institute for Science and Religion.

== Biography ==
Bob White is also a Fellow of St Edmund's College, Cambridge, prior to which he was a student and Research Fellow at Emmanuel College, Cambridge. A Fellow of the Geological Society, and a member of the American Geophysical Union and several other professional bodies; he serves on numerous of their committees. He leads a research group investigating the Earth's dynamic crust. His most cited paper (White & McKenzie 1989) used geophysical evidence in conjunction with models of melt generation beneath rifts to show that the largest and most rapid effusions of volcanic rock on the earth, known as flood basalts, result from continental rifting above mantle plumes. He has organised fieldwork in many different countries and supervised 50 PhD students at the Department of Earth Sciences in Cambridge, many of whom are now prominent in academia, industry, government and education. His work at sea has taken him to the Atlantic, Indian and Pacific Oceans and his research group is currently investigating the internal structure of volcanoes in Iceland, New Zealand, the Faroes and the Atlantic margin. His scientific work is published in over 350 papers and articles.

== Honours and awards ==
- 2018 Awarded the Gold Medal of the Royal Astronomical Society for Geophysics

== Publications ==
=== Selected Scientific Publications ===
- White, R. & McKenzie, D. (1989). Magmatism at rift zones: The generation of volcanic continental margins and flood basalts. Journal of Geophysical Research, 94, 7685–7729.
- White, R. S., McKenzie, D. & O'Nions, R. K. (1992). Oceanic crustal thickness from seismic measurements and rare earth element inversions. Journal of Geophysical Research, 97, 19,683–19,715.
- Bown, J. W. & White, R. S. (1994). Variation with spreading rate of oceanic crustal thickness and geochemistry. Earth and Planetary Science Letters, 121, 435–449.
- White, R. S., Minshull, T. A., Bickle, M. J. & Robinson, C. J. (2001). Melt generation at very slow-spreading oceanic ridges: constraints from geochemical and geophysical data. Journal of Petrology, 42, 1171–1196.
- White, R. S., Christie, P. A. F., Kusznir, N. J., Roberts, A., Davies, A., Hurst, N., Lunnon, Z., Parkin, C. J., Roberts, A. W., Smith, L. K., Spitzer, R., Surendra, A. & Tymms, V. (2002). iSIMM pushes frontiers of marine seismic acquisition. First Break, 20, 782–786.
- White, R. S., Smallwood, J. R., Fliedner, M. M., Boslaugh, B., Maresh, J. & Fruehn, J. (2003). Imaging and regional distribution of basalt flows in the Faroe-Shetland Basin. Geophysical Prospecting, 51, 215–231.
- Harrison, A. J. & White, R. S. (2004). Crustal structure of the Taupo Volcanic Zone, New Zealand: stretching and igneous intrusion, Geophysical Research Letters, vol. 31, L13615, doi:10.1029/2004GL019885.
- White, R. S., et al. (2008). Lower-crustal intrusion on the North Atlantic continental margin, Nature, 452, 460–464 plus supplementary information at www.nature.com, doi:10.1038/nature06687
- White, R. S. and Smith, L. K. (2009). Crustal structure of the Hatton and the conjugate east Greenland rifted volcanic continental margins, NE Atlantic, Journal of Geophysical Research, 114, B02305, doi:10.1029/2008JB005856
- White, R. S., Drew, J., Martens, H. R., Key, A. J., Soosalu, H. &Jakobsdóttir, S. S. (2011). Dynamicsof dyke intrusion in the mid-crust of Iceland, Earth and Planetary Science Letters, 304, 300–312, doi:10.1016/j.epsl.2011.02.038
- Tarasewicz, J., Brandsdóttir, B., Robert S. White, R.S., Hensch, M. & Thorbjarnardóttir, B. (2012). Using microearthquakes totrack repeated magma intrusions beneath the Eyjafjallajökull stratovolcano, Iceland, Journal of Geophysical Research, 117, B00C06,doi:10.1029/2011JB008751
- Martens, H. R. & White, R. S. (2013). Triggering of microearthquakes in Iceland by volatiles released from a dyke intrusion, Geophysical Journal International, 194 (3), 1738‒1754, doi:10.1093/gji/ggt184

=== Selected Science-Religion Publications ===
- White, Robert (2001). Science: Friend or Foe? The Church of England Newspaper, Friday 24 August 2001, p. 11 (also published on Christians in Science web site www.cis.org.uk)
- Alexander, D. & White, R. S. (2004). Beyond Belief: Science, Faith and Ethical Challenges, Lion, Oxford, 219pp.
- White, R. S. (2005). Truth in the geological sciences, in Can We Be Sure About Anything? Science, Faith and Postmodernism (ed. Denis Alexander), Apollos (an imprint of Inter-Varsity Press), Leicester, pp. 187–213.
- White, R. S. (2005). "Genesis and Creation, Truth Matters", Reform
- White, R. S. (2007). "The Age of the Earth", Faraday Paper 8 [see also Evangelicals Now, December 2002, 18].
- Spencer, Nick and White, Robert (2007). Christianity, Climate Change and Sustainable Living, SPCK, 245pp. [published in USA as Spencer, Nick, White, Robert and Vroblesky, Virginia, by Hendrickson].
- White, Robert S. (editor) (2009) Creation in Crisis: Christian Perspectives on Sustainability, SPCK, 298pp.
- Jonathan A. Moo and Robert S. White (2013) Hope in an Age of Despair: The Gospel and the Future of Life on Earth, Inter-VarsityPress, 224 pp., ISBN 978-1844748778.

Academic offices
Preceded by Chris Chapman	Professor of Geophysics, University of Cambridge; 1989-2020	Succeeded by Sergei Lebedev
