= Jon Jacobs (disambiguation) =

Jon Jacobs may refer to:

- Jon Jacobs (born 1966), British actor and entrepreneur
- Jon Jacobs (comics), see Fan Expo Canada
- Jon Jacobs (music producer), nominated for Latin Grammy Award for Best Engineered Album

== See also ==
- John Jacobs (disambiguation)
- Jonathan Jacob, Big Brother Celebrity Hijack contestant
