= Andrew Pyle (philosopher) =

British philosopher

Andrew Pyle (born 17 March 1955) is a British philosopher on the history of philosophical atomism.

Pyle is professor Emeritus in Early Modern Philosophy at the University of Bristol, where he also received his doctorate. His dissertation was titled Atomism and its Critics: Democritus to Newton. Pyle also writes on the history of science and has given talks within the university on the nature of science historically. Pyle is one of the editors of the Continuum Encyclopedia of British Philosophy. Andrew Pyle engaged in an apologetics debate with William Lane Craig in 2008 on the topic: Does the Christian God Exist?

In 2018, Bristol University held an all day conference honouring the thematic themes of Pyle's research

== Publications ==
- Hume's Dialogues on Natural Religion (Continuum, 2006)
- Malebranche (Routledge, London, 2003)
- Boyle on Science and the Mechanical Philosophy: A Reply to Chalmers, Studies in the History and Philosophy of Science 33 (2002), 175-190
- The Rationality of the Chemical Revolution, in Nola & Sankey, eds, After Popper, Kuhn and Feyerabend (Kluwer, Dordrecht, 2000)
- Atomism and its Critics: Democritus to Newton (Thoemmes, Bristol 1995)
