= Lion Hudson =

- Parent company: SPCK Group
- Founded: 2017; 9 years ago
- Founder: David Dorricott
- Country of origin: England
- Headquarters location: Oxford, England
- Distribution: Marston Book Services (UK), Koorong, Trafalgar Square Publishing (US)
- Key people: Suzanne Wilson-Higgins, Managing Director; Caroline Gregory, Finance & Shared Services Director.
- Publication types: Children's Bible Retelling, books, literature, ebooks, audio books
- Nonfiction topics: Religion, Christianity
- Fiction genres: Literature
- Imprints: Lion Books; Lion Scholar; Lion Children's Books; Lion Fiction; Candle Books; Monarch Books
- No. of employees: 27
- Official website: www.lionhudson.com

Lion Hudson is UK's largest publisher of children's Christian books. It is based in Oxford, United Kingdom. Since 2021, it has been an imprint of SPCK.

== History ==
It had its origins as Lion Publishing (founded in 1971) and Hudson International (founded in 1977) which merged to become Lion Hudson PLC in 2003. The company became owned by the AFD Group in the Isle of Man in August 2017 upon the acquisition of the assets of "Lion Hudson PLC in administration" (now liquidated).

Lion Hudson was purchased by SPCK in 2021 and is now an imprint of SPCK. It is the UK's largest publisher of children's Christian books.

== See also ==
- List of publishers of children's books
