= The God Argument =

2013 book by A. C. Grayling

The God Argument: The Case against Religion and for Humanism
- Author: A. C. Grayling
- Subject: Humanism, Religion
- Publisher: Bloomsbury
- Publication date: 2013
- Pages: 288
- ISBN: 978-1620401903
- Preceded by: The Good Book

The God Argument: The Case against Religion and for Humanism is a 2013 book by the English philosopher and humanist A. C. Grayling, in which he counters the arguments for the existence of God, and puts forward humanism as an alternative to religion.

Grayling is concerned with tone. He states that he wrote the first half of the book "thoroughly and calmly to examine all the arguments offered in support of religious beliefs", such as the ontological argument for the existence of God, which he argues against in the first half of the book.

In the other half, he proposes humanism as a suitable substitute of religion for a moral life or what he calls a "good life". According to his definition of humanism, if one believes that moral choices should be grounded in "the responsible use of reason" and "human experience in the real world" then one is a humanist.
