= Jack Jacobs (cricketer) =

New Zealand cricketer

Personal information
- Born: 16 April 1909; Dunedin, New Zealand
- Died: 15 June 2003 (aged 94); Southport, Queensland, Australia
- Batting: Right-handed
- Role: Batsman, occasional wicket-keeper

Domestic team information
- Years: Team
- 1927/28–1937/38: Canterbury

Career statistics
Competition	First-class
Matches	12
Runs scored	464
Batting average	23.20
100s/50s	0/4
Top score	69
Catches/stumpings	5/1
- Source: Cricinfo, 6 February 2020

Jack Jacobs (16 April 1909 – 15 June 2003) was a New Zealand cricketer. He played first-class cricket for Canterbury between 1927 and 1938.

Jacobs attended Christchurch Boys' High School. He was a batsman who occasionally kept wicket. His highest first-class scores were 61 (Canterbury's top score) and 69 in his first match in December 1927, when Canterbury beat Otago by four wickets. He played senior cricket in Christchurch until the early 1950s, and was a member of the Canterbury Cricket Association's management committee in the 1930s and 1940s.

Jacobs served in Greece and Crete with the New Zealand Army in World War II. He was captured by the Germans and spent several years as a prisoner of war. After the war ended in Europe he toured England with the New Zealand Services team from May to September 1945, playing in the team's only first-class match.
