= John C. Jacob =

Indian environmentalist (1936–2008)

- Born: 1936; Nattakam, Kottayam, British India
- Died: 11 October 2008 (aged 72); Payyanur, Kerala, India
- Occupations: Environmentalist; professor; author

John C. Jacob (1936 – 11 October 2008) was one of the pioneers of the environmental movement in Kerala, India.

== Early life and education ==
John Jacob was born at Nattakam in Kottayam in 1936.

He earned a degree in zoology from Madras Christian College.

== Career ==
He then joined the faculty at St. Joseph's College, Devagiri in Kozhikode before becoming the head of the Zoology Department at Payyanur College. He worked at Payyanur until he retired in 1992.

At Payyanur, in 1972 he started a zoology club that would form the genesis of campus-based nature conservation activities. The club also became involved in protesting threats to the environment. Jacobs also started several ecological magazines stressing the need to preserve nature, as well as setting up the Society for Environment Education, Kerala (SEEK), which published Soochimukhi magazine.

Jacob led the movement against the Silent Valley project in South Kerala.

He is the author of several books, including Prakrithi: Nireekshanavum Vyakhyanavum and Urangunnavarude Thazhvaraka. He also translated Daniel Quinn's works Ishmael and My Ishmael into Malayalam.

== Death ==
He died in Payyanur on 11 October 2008.

== Awards ==
In 2004, he received the Science Forum's Environmental Education and Eco-Spirituality Award and in 2005, the Kerala government honored him with the inaugural Vanamitram Award.

In recognition of his contributions to the environment, he was awarded the Kerala Biodiversity Board's Haritham Award.

== Legacy ==
The name of the balsaminaceae plant Impatiens johnsiana is dedicated to Prof. John C. Jacob who was popularly known as "Johnsi". The new plant is endemic to these parts of Western Ghats on densely clothed tree trunks in evergreen forests at an altitude of 1500-700 MSL. The observations showed that there are less than five hundred mature individuals restricted to a 10 km2 vested forest area. Impatiens johnsiana falls under the category Critically Endangered-CR (IUCN 2001). The research team included Dr M. K. Ratheesh Narayanan (now with Payyannur College Kannur; Dr C. N. Sunil (Sree Narayana Mangalm College, Moothakunnam Ernakulam); Dr N. Anil Kumar, Jayesh P. Joseph (MSSRF, Wayanad) and Dr T. Shaju (Tropical Botanic Garden and Research Institute, Thiruvananathapuram).
