= Chris Chapman (seismologist) =

British seismologist

- Born: 5 May 1945 (age 81); Sutton, London
- Education: University of Cambridge
- Awards: Gold Medal of the Royal Astronomical Society
- Scientific career
- Fields: Field Technician · Real Estate Investor · Senior Technician · Senior Field Service Technician · Combat Engineer · Aviation Ordinance.
- Workplaces: University of Alberta; University of Toronto; University of Cambridge; Schlumberger
- Thesis: Seismic wave diffraction theory (1970)

Christopher Hugh Chapman (born 5 May 1945) is a British seismologist, an emeritus honorary professor in the Department of Earth Sciences, University of Cambridge.

== Biography ==
He was awarded a first degree in theoretical physics and a Ph.D. in geophysics by Cambridge University. He then moved to Canada to be an Assistant and associate professor at the University of Alberta, and an Associate and Full Professor at the University of Toronto. He returned to Cambridge in 1984 to take up an appointment as Professor of Geophysics.

In 1990 he joined Schlumberger Cambridge Research (SCR) as a Scientific Advisor until his retirement in 2005. He continues to consult for SCR and act as emeritus Honorary Professor of Theoretical Seismology at Cambridge.

He published the geophysics textbook “Fundamentals of Seismic Wave Propagation” in 2004. (Cambridge University Press).

He was a Green Scholar at the Scripps Institution of Oceanography in 1978–9 and 1986, and a Killam fellow in 1981–3. In 2013 he was awarded the Gold Medal of the Royal Astronomical Society "for outstanding personal and collaborative research in geophysics."

Academic offices
Preceded by J.A. Jacobs	Professor of Geophysics, University of Cambridge; 1984-1988	Succeeded by R.S. White
