= J. A. Jacobs =

British geophysicist (1916–2003)

“Jack” Jacobs
- Born: 13 April 1916
- Died: 13 December 2003 (aged 87); Aberystwyth, Wales
- Education: DSc (1987)
- Alma mater: University College London and Royal Holloway College
- Occupation: Geophysicist
- Spouse: Ann Wintle (3rd)
- Honours: Gold Medal of the Royal Astronomical Society (2002)

John Arthur “Jack” Jacobs (13 April 1916 – 13 December 2003) was a British geophysicist and mathematician, whose primary area of research was geomagnetism. He worked at multiple universities in Canada and the UK, and was awarded the Gold medal of the Royal Astronomical Society in 2002.

== Early life and career ==
Jacobs graduated from University College London, with an MA in mathematics in 1939 with specialism in higher mathematics and hydrodynamics.

After the start of World War 2 in 1939, Jacobs spent two years working for the Bristol Aeroplane Company. He then undertook wartime service at the Royal Naval Engineering College where he was a senior lecturer and deputy Training Commander with the rank of Lieutenant Commander RN from 1941.

In 1943, he became a lecturer of mathematics at Royal Holloway College, and was awarded his PhD degree in 1949 for research in plastic flow.

== Academic career in Canada ==
Although British, Jacobs spent a significant part of his career in Canada where he held positions at a number of the major Canadian universities, became a Fellow of the Royal Society of Canada (1958) and was awarded numerous honours including the Canadian Centennial Medal (1967), the J. Tuzo Wilson Medal of the Canadian Geophysical Union (1982) and an Honorary DSc by the University of British Columbia (1987).

The return of Leopold Infeld to Poland in 1950 gave Jacobs the opportunity to move from the UK to Canada, where he took up the position of associate professor of Applied Mathematics at the University of Toronto. He started his appointment there in 1951. At Toronto, Jacobs was drawn into the geophysics group by Tuzo Wilson, he soon became the group's resident theoretician and wrote papers on heat flow, core formation and many other problems.

The University of British Columbia hired Jacobs as Professor of Physics in 1957 and within ten years he had created the Institute of Earth Sciences and the Department of Geophysics and Astronomy. He later moved to the University of Alberta (1967–74), as Killam Professor of Science, where he established the Institute of Earth and Planetary Physics and became its first director.

From 1971 to 1975 Jacobs was chairman of the Canadian National Committee for the International Union of Geodesy and Geophysics.

== Academic career after Canada ==
Jacobs returned to the UK in 1974 to become the second Professor of Geophysics at the University of Cambridge, succeeding Sir Edward Bullard. Whilst at Cambridge he became a Fellow of Darwin College and, from 1977 to 1982, the Vice-Master of the college.

In 1994 he was awarded the John Adam Fleming Medal by the American Geophysical Union (AGU), for original research in geomagnetism and atmospheric electricity. He was also a Fellow of the AGU and a Fellow of the Royal Astronomical Society and was awarded the RAS's Price Medal in 1994, and the RAS Gold Medal in 2002.

He retired from the University of Cambridge in 1983 and later moved to Aberystwyth, Wales where his third wife Ann Grace Wintle held an academic position and was later promoted to a professorship. Jacobs was made an Honorary Professor of University of Wales, Aberystwyth in 1988.

== Scientific work ==
Jacobs's published work runs to nearly 200 scientific papers and seven books which cover the temperature of the interior of the Earth, geomagnetic micropulsations, magnetic storms, the Earth's core and reversals of the Earth's magnetic field.

The citation for the RAS Gold Award highlights his proposal in 1956 for an adiabatic cooling model of the Earth, in which the Earth's liquid core slowly cools and freezes from the centre outwards to form the solid inner core (which had been shown to exist by seismic observations made in the 1930s). This proposal was made years before the idea of plate tectonics and before anyone had thought of the Earth losing heat by convection, let alone in an adiabatic state.

He went on to make significant contributions to the theory of the origin of the core and its evolution and developed the starting point for ideas on core-mantle stability.

He also worked on external geomagnetism, making numerous refined studies of fluctuations of the geomagnetic field and associated phenomena in the upper atmosphere and the citation includes his work on micropulsations – ultra-low frequency variations of the Earth's magnetic field that originate in the magnetosphere.

== Personal life ==
His first wife was Daisy Sarah Ann Montgomerie. They had two daughters before she died in 1974. His second wife was Peggy Jones. In 1982 he married his third wife, Ann Grace Wintle.

Jacobs died on 13 December 2003 in Aberystwyth.

== See also ==
- List of geophysicists

== Bibliography ==
- Physics and Geology: By J. A. Jacobs, R. D. Russell and J. Tuzo Wilson (1959 & 1974)
- The Earth's Core and Geomagnetism: By J. A. Jacobs (1963)
- Geomagnetic Micropulsations: By J. A. Jacobs (1970)
- A Tectbook on Geonomy: By J. A. Jacobs (1974)
- The Earth's Core: By J. A. Jacobs (1975 & 1987)
- Reversals of the Earth's Magnetic Field: By J. A. Jacobs (1984)
- The Deep Interior of the Earth: By J. A. Jacobs (1992)

Academic offices
Preceded by Sir Edward Bullard	Professor of Geophysics, University of Cambridge; 1974–1983	Succeeded by Chris Chapman
