= List of California Institute of Technology people =

The California Institute of Technology has had numerous notable alumni and faculty.

== Notable alumni ==
Alumni who went on to become members of the faculty are listed in the faculty section.

=== Physics and astronomy ===
- Marc Aaronson, BS 1972
- George O. Abell, BS 1951, MS 1952, PhD 1957; professor of Astronomy UCLA
- Eric G. Adelberger, BS 1960, PhD 1967; co-recipient of 2021 Breakthrough Prize in Fundamental Physics
- Charles R. Alcock, PhD 1977
- Berni Alder, PhD 1951; National Medal of Science recipient
- Carl D. Anderson, BS 1927, PhD 1930, faculty; Nobel laureate in physics (1936) for proving the existence of positrons
- Roger Angel, MS 1966; Kavli Prize laureate; awarded MacArthur Fellowship
- Horace W. Babcock, BS 1934
- James M. Bardeen, PhD 1965
- Eric Becklin, PhD 1968
- Edmund Bertschinger, BS 1979
- Eric Betzig, BS 1983, co-recipient of 2014 Nobel Prize in Chemistry "for the development of super-resolved fluorescence microscopy"
- J. Richard Bond, PhD 1979; Gruber Prize in Cosmology winner
- Ira Sprague Bowen, PhD 1926
- Robert Brode, PhD 1924
- Carlton M. Caves, PhD 1979
- Paul Chaikin, BS 1966
- Chung-Yao Chao, PhD 1930
- Roger Chevalier, BS 1970
- John Clauser, BS 1964; Wolf Prize winner and co-recipient of 2022 Nobel Prize in Physics "for experiments with entangled photons, establishing the violation of Bell inequalities and pioneering quantum information science"
- Donald D. Clayton, PhD 1962
- Judith Gamora Cohen, PhD 1971; Kate Van Nuys Page Professor of Astronomy at Caltech
- Sidney Coleman, PhD 1962
- H. Richard Crane, BS 1930, PhD 1934; National Medal of Science recipient
- Roger Dashen, PhD 1964
- Lance J. Dixon, BS 1982
- Jesse DuMond, BS 1916, PhD 1929; professor of Physics at Caltech
- Robley D. Evans, BS 1928, PhD 1932
- Alexei Filippenko, PhD 1984, Gruber Prize in Cosmology winner
- James C. Fletcher, PhD 1948
- William A. Fowler, PhD 1936, faculty; Nobel laureate in physics (1983) "for his theoretical and experimental studies of the nuclear reactions of importance in the formation of the chemical elements in the universe"; National Medal of Science recipient
- Edward Fredkin, undergraduate studies (1952)
- George M. Fuller, BS 1976, PhD 1981
- Neil Gehrels, PhD 1982; Dan David Prize winner
- Andrea M. Ghez, PhD 1992; Crafoord Prize Laureate in Astronomy, 2012; Sackler Prize winner; awarded MacArthur Fellowship; co-recipient of 2020 Nobel Prize in Physics "for the discovery of a supermassive compact object at the centre of our galaxy"
- Donald A. Glaser, PhD 1950; Nobel laureate in physics (1960) "for the invention of the bubble chamber"
- James E. Gunn, PhD 1966; Crafoord Prize Laureate in Astronomy, 2005; Gruber Prize in Cosmology winner; National Medal of Science recipient; Kyoto Prize winner
- Robert N. Hall, BS 1942, PhD 1948
- James Hartle, PhD 1964
- Jeffrey A. Harvey, PhD 1981
- Lars Hernquist, PhD 1985; Gruber Prize in Cosmology winner
- John Huchra, PhD 1976
- Vernon W. Hughes, MS 1942
- Kamaloddin Jenab, PhD 1936
- David C. Jewitt, PhD 1983; Shaw Prize laureate; Kavli Prize laureate
- J. R. Jokipii, PhD 1965; Regents' Professor Planetary Sciences and Astronomy, University of Arizona; member of National Academy of Sciences
- Kenneth Kellermann, PhD 1963
- Robert Kirshner, PhD 1975; Wolf Prize winner
- Christopher Kochanek, PhD 1989
- Steven E. Koonin, BS 1972; former faculty; former Undersecretary for Science, Department of Energy; former chief scientist at BP
- John Kormendy, PhD 1976
- Charles Christian Lauritsen, PhD 1929
- Thomas Lauritsen, BS 1936, PhD 1939; former professor of Physics at Caltech; member of National Academy of Sciences
- Robert B. Leighton, BS 1941, PhD 1947
- Robert Lin, BS 1962
- Tom Lubensky, BS 1964
- Hideo Mabuchi, PhD 1998; awarded MacArthur Fellowship
- Arthur B. McDonald, PhD 1969; Nobel laureate in physics (2015) "for the discovery of neutrino oscillations, which shows that neutrinos have mass"; Breakthrough Prize laureate
- William B. McLean, BS 1935, PhD 1939
- Curt Michel, BS 1955, PhD 1962; selected as NASA scientist-astronaut (but was not assigned to any spaceflight missions)
- Dimitri Mihalas, PhD 1963
- Mark M. Mills, PhD 1948
- Norman Murray, BS 1979; professor and former director of Canadian Institute of Theoretical Astrophysics at University of Toronto
- Morris Muskat, PhD 1929
- Seth Neddermeyer, PhD 1935
- Jerry Nelson, BS 1965; Kavli Prize laureate
- Gerry Neugebauer, PhD 1960; former faculty
- Frank Oppenheimer, PhD 1939; Manhattan Project physicist; founder of the Exploratorium
- Douglas D. Osheroff, BS 1967; Nobel laureate in physics (1996) "for their discovery of superfluidity in helium-3"; awarded MacArthur Fellowship
- Wolfgang K. H. Panofsky, PhD 1942; National Medal of Science recipient
- Eugene Parker, PhD 1951; Kyoto Prize laureate; National Medal of Science recipient; Crafoord Prize Laureate in Astronomy (2020)
- Joseph Polchinski, BS 1975; Breakthrough Prize laureate
- Charles Y. Prescott, PhD 1966
- William H. Press, PhD 1973
- David E. Pritchard, BS 1962
- Leo James Rainwater, BS 1939; Nobel laureate in physics (1975) "for the discovery of the connection between collective motion and particle motion in atomic nuclei and the development of the theory of the structure of the atomic nucleus based on this connection"
- Wade Regehr, PhD 1988
- Mark J. Reid, PhD 1975; Senior Radio Astronomer at the Smithsonian Astrophysical Observatory, part of the Harvard-Smithsonian Center for Astrophysics; world leading astronomer in development and application of Very Long Baseline Interferometry (VLBI) in galactic structure imaging and measurements; member of National Academy of Sciences
- Howard Percy Robertson, PhD 1925; former faculty
- Malvin Ruderman, PhD 1951
- Allan Sandage, PhD 1953; Crafoord Prize Laureate in Astronomy, 1991; Gruber Prize in Cosmology winner; National Medal of Science recipient
- Anneila Sargent, PhD 1967; faculty
- Paul Schechter, PhD 1975
- Stephen A. Shectman, PhD 1973; staff member, Observatories of the Carnegie Institution for Science; member of National Academy of Sciences and fellow of American Academy of Arts and Sciences
- Robert J. Schoelkopf, PhD 1995
- Kate Scholberg, PhD 1996
- David Schramm, PhD 1971
- Bernard F. Schutz, PhD 1972
- William Shockley, BS 1932; Nobel laureate in physics (1956) "for their researches on semiconductors and their discovery of the transistor effect"
- Charles C. Steidel, PhD 1990; Lee A. DuBridge Professor of Astronomy at Caltech; MacArthur Fellow (2002); Gruber Prize in Cosmology winner
- Paul Steinhardt, BS 1973
- Guyford Stever, PhD 1941; National Medal of Science recipient
- Martin Summerfield, PhD 1941
- Saul Teukolsky, PhD 1973
- Kip Thorne, BS 1962; faculty; Richard P. Feynman Professor of Theoretical Physics, Emeritus at Caltech; Shaw Prize laureate; Kavli Prize laureate; Breakthrough Prize laureate; Gruber Prize in Cosmology winner; Harvey Prize recipient; co-recipient of 2017 Nobel Prize in Physics "for decisive contributions to the LIGO detector and the observation of gravitational waves"
- William G. Tifft, PhD 1958
- Alvin V. Tollestrup, PhD 1950; former faculty; National Medal of Technology and Innovation recipient
- Charles H. Townes, PhD 1939; Nobel laureate in physics (1964) "for fundamental work in the field of quantum electronics, which has led to the construction of oscillators and amplifiers based on the maser-laser principle"; National Medal of Science recipient
- George Trilling, BS 1951, PhD 1955; director of Physics Division at Lawrence Berkeley National Lab
- Virginia Louise Trimble, PhD 1968
- Alvin Trivelpiece, PhD 1958
- Michael Turner, BS 1971
- George Wallerstein, PhD 1958
- William Ward, PhD 1973
- Clifford Martin Will, PhD 1971
- Kenneth G. Wilson, PhD 1961; Wolf Prize laureate (1980), Nobel laureate in physics (1982) "for his theory for critical phenomena in connection with phase transitions"
- Olin Chaddock Wilson, PhD 1934
- Robert W. Wilson, PhD 1962; Nobel laureate in physics (1978) "for their discovery of cosmic microwave background radiation"
- Bruce Winstein, PhD 1970
- Jack Wisdom, PhD 1981; awarded MacArthur Fellowship
- Stephen Wolfram, PhD 1979; awarded MacArthur Fellowship
- George Zweig, PhD 1964; awarded MacArthur Fellowship
- Barton Zwiebach, PhD 1983
- Norman J. Zabusky, PhD 1959

=== Chemistry and chemical engineering ===
- Matthew John Allen, PhD 2004; known for Lanthanide chemistry, contrast agents for magnetic resonance imaging, catalysis, molecular imaging, coordination chemistry; Fellow of the American Association for the Advancement of Science (2018) and Fellow of the American Chemical Society (2019)
- David T. Allen, PhD 1983; Melvin H. Gertz Regents Chair in Chemical Engineering at University of Texas, Austin; known for contributions to improving air quality and for developments in sustainable engineering education and practice; elected member of National Academy of Engineering
- Fred C. Anson, BS 1954, former faculty; Elizabeth W. Gilloon Professor of Chemistry, Emeritus at Caltech; member of National Academy of Sciences; known for pioneering work on the electrochemistry of polymers, catalysis of electrode reactions, and electrochemical reactions that involve ultrathin coating of molecules on electrode surfaces
- Peter B. Armentrout, PhD 1980
- Jesse L. Beauchamp, BS 1964
- Arnold Beckman, PhD 1928; inventor of the pH meter, founder of Beckman Instruments and financier of the first "silicon" company in Silicon Valley, Shockley Semiconductor Laboratory; National Medal of Technology and Innovation recipient; National Medal of Science recipient
- David Beratan, PhD 1986
- Rena Bizios, MS 1971
- Helen Blackwell, PhD 1999
- Jesse D. Bloom, PhD 2007
- Richard D. Braatz, PhD 1993
- Leo Brewer, BS 1940
- Richard G. Brewer, BS 1951; pioneer in quantum optics and nonlinear laser spectroscopy, particularly advanced techniques in the study of laser induced steady state and transient phenomena; researcher at IBM Almaden research laboratories; IBM fellow, elected member of National Academy of Sciences
- Gary Brudvig, PhD 1981; Benjamin Silliman Professor of Chemistry and Professor of Molecular Biophysics and Biochemistry at Yale University and Director of Yale Energy Sciences Institute. Elected fellow of American Academy of Arts and Sciences and member of National Academy of Sciences. Known for advancing molecular understanding of photosynthesis and contributing to design of artificial photosynthetic systems to produce solar fuels.
- Emily A. Carter, PhD 1987
- Christopher Chang, BS/MS 1997
- Douglas S. Clark, PhD 1983
- Robert N. Clayton, PhD 1955, National Medal of Science recipient
- Robert E. Cohen, PhD 1972
- William H. Corcoran BS 1941, PhD 1948; former faculty, Institute Professor of Chemical Engineering at Caltech; known for research in biomedical engineering (particularly fluid flow and design of artificial heart valves), chemical engineering kinetics, engineering design, pharmaceutical process engineering and development design, rocketry, and transport processes; member of National Academy of Engineering
- Charles D. Coryell, BS 1932, PhD 1935
- Francis J. Doyle III, PhD 1991; Dean of the John A. Paulson School of Engineering and Applied Sciences at Harvard University
- Paul Hugh Emmett, PhD 1925
- David A. Evans, PhD 1967
- Gary Felsenfeld, PhD 1955, Distinguished Investigator and chief of the section on physical chemistry in the Laboratory of Molecular Biology at the National Institute of Diabetes and Digestive and Kidney Diseases at the National Institutes of Health; and regulation of globin gene expression during development; member of National Academy of Sciences
- M.G. Finn, BS 1980
- Gerald Fuller, PhD 1980
- Neil Garg, PhD 2005
- Jeff Gelles, PhD 1986; Aron and Imre Tauber Professor of Biochemistry and Molecular Pharmacology at Brandeis University; leading researcher in single-molecule biophysical imaging and study of molecular motors and assemblies involved in DNA, RNA, and protein assembly, transcription, and modification; fellow of American Academy of Arts and Sciences
- Jacqueline G. Gish, PhD 1976; Northrop Grumman Technology Fellow; recognized for significant contributions to the development of high-energy lasers, development of diagnostics for plasma and laser programs, and leadership of efforts on chemical lasers and solid state lasers; member of National Academy of Engineering
- William A. Goddard, III, PhD 1965; faculty
- Marc Hillmyer, PhD 1994; McKnight Presidential Endowed Chair Professor of Chemistry at University of Minnesota - Twin Cities. Elected fellow of American Academy of Arts and Sciences.
- Wilson Ho, BS/MS 1975; Donald Bren Professor of Physics & Astronomy and Chemistry, University of California, Irvine; physical chemist known for development of single-molecule scanning tunneling microscopy methods and instrumentation and investigation of nanoscale materials, surfaces, and phenomena; member of National Academy of Sciences
- James L. Hoard, PhD 1932
- Brian M. Hoffman, PhD 1966
- James A. Ibers, BS 1951, PhD 1954
- Harold S. Johnston, PhD 1948; National Medal of Science recipient; winner of Tyler World Prize for Environmental Achievement
- Christopher W. Jones, PhD 1999
- William D. Jones, PhD 1979; Charles F. Houghton Professor of Chemistry at University of Rochester; elected fellow of American Academy of Arts and Sciences and National Academy of Sciences
- Eric W. Kaler, BS 1978
- Martin Karplus, PhD 1953; Nobel laureate in chemistry (2013) "for the development of multiscale models for complex chemical systems"
- Chaitan Khosla, PhD 1990; Alan T. Waterman Award winner
- Julia A. Kornfield, BS 1983; Elizabeth W. Gilloon Professor of Chemical Engineering
- Nathan Lewis, BS/MS 1977; faculty; George L. Argyros Professor of Chemistry at Caltech
- William Lipscomb, PhD 1946; Nobel laureate in chemistry (1976) "for his studies on the structure of boranes illuminating problems of chemical bonding"
- James Mayer, PhD 1982; Charlotte Fitch Roberts Professor of Chemistry at Yale University; pioneering chemist known for work in coupled transfers of protons and electrons in catalysis and bioinorganic chemistry; elected member of American Academy of Arts and Sciences and National Academy of Sciences
- Joseph Edward Mayer, BS 1924
- Heather Maynard, PhD 2000
- Stephen L. Mayo, PhD 1987; faculty; Bren Professor of Biology and Chemistry at Caltech
- Harden M. McConnell, PhD 1951; Wolf Prize winner; National Medal of Science recipient
- Edwin Mattison McMillan, BS 1928, MS 1929; Nobel laureate in chemistry (1951) "for their discoveries in the chemistry of the transuranium elements"; National Medal of Science recipient
- Matthew Meselson, PhD 1957; Lasker Award recipient; awarded MacArthur Fellowship
- Liviu M. Mirica, BS 1999
- Kurt Mislow, PhD 1947
- Jeffrey F. Morris, PhD 1995; Professor of Chemical Engineering and Director, Levich Institute, City College of New York. President of Society of Rheology and recipient of Bingham Medal in 2023. Elected member of National Academy of Engineering "for research on the fundamentals of concentrated suspension and hydrate slurry flows and for implementing applications in many industries."
- Milan Mrksich, PhD 1994
- Daniel G. Nocera, PhD 1984
- Karen Oegema, BS 1989
- José Onuchic, PhD 1987
- Ann Orel, BS 1977
- Dinshaw Patel, MS 1963
- Linus Pauling, PhD 1925; former faculty, two-time sole recipient of Nobel Prize in Chemistry (1954) "for his research into the nature of the chemical bond and its application to the elucidation of the structure of complex substances" and Nobel Peace Prize (1962) for his work on nuclear disarmament and his contributions to the Partial Test Ban Treaty; National Medal of Science recipient
- Nikola Pavletich, BS 1988
- Cornelius J. Pings, BS 1951, PhD 1955; former faculty in chemical engineering and chemical physics; former provost and professor of chemical engineering at University of Southern California; former president of Association of American Universities (AAU); member of National Academy of Engineering
- Kenneth Pitzer, BS 1935; National Medal of Science recipient
- Dana Powers, BS 1970, PhD 1975; senior scientist, nuclear energy and fuel cycle programs, Sandia National Laboratories; member of National Academy of Engineering; known for contributions to commercial nuclear power plant safety worldwide and to radioactive source-term processes
- Danny Reible, PhD 1982
- Melanie Sanford, PhD 2001; awarded MacArthur Fellowship
- George C. Schatz, PhD 1976
- Richard Scheller, PhD 1980; Kavli Prize laureate; Alan T. Waterman Award winner; Lasker Award recipient
- Warren G. Schlinger, BS 1944, PhD 1949; philanthropist and former chemical engineer at Texaco, Inc. noted for over 60 patents and decades of work on chemical processes involving syngas and cleaner energy recovery from fossil fuels; elected member of National Academy of Engineering
- Peter G. Schultz, BS 1979, PhD 1984; Alan T. Waterman Award winner; Wolf Prize winner
- Dorothy Semenow, PhD 1953; first woman awarded PhD by Caltech
- Joe Mauk Smith, BS 1937; Professor of Chemical Engineering, Emeritus at University of California, Davis; elected member of National Academy of Engineering; known for leadership in chemical reaction kinetics and thermodynamics, and teaching in those subjects; author of several influential textbooks
- Shannon Stahl, PhD 1997; Steenbock Professor of Chemical Sciences at University of Wisconsin, Madison; recognized for research in chemical catalysis and elected fellow of American Academy of Arts and Sciences and National Academy of Sciences
- Howard A. Stone, PhD 1988
- Scott Strobel, PhD 1992
- Yongkui Sun, PhD 1990; Executive Director of Business Development and Licensing at Merck & Co.; known for contributions to green, economical processes for pharmaceuticals and for developing business strategies in emerging markets; member of National Academy of Engineering
- Kenneth S. Suslick, BS 1974
- Timothy M. Swager, PhD 1988
- Patricia Thiel, PhD 1981
- Mark Thompson, PhD 1985; chemist
- Holden Thorp, PhD 1989
- Margaret A. Tolbert, PhD 1986; Distinguished Professor of Chemistry at University of Colorado, Boulder; member of National Academy of Sciences; prominent researcher in field of atmospheric chemistry
- Donald Truhlar, PhD 1970
- Michael Tsapatsis, PhD 1994
- Nicholas Turro, PhD 1963
- John S. Waugh, PhD 1953; Wolf Prize winner
- Robert Waymouth, PhD 1987
- George M. Whitesides, PhD 1964; Dan David Prize winner; Kyoto Prize laureate; King Faisal International Prize winner; National Medal of Science recipient; Kavli Prize in Nanoscience co-recipient
- Edgar Bright Wilson, PhD 1933; National Medal of Science recipient
- Saul Winstein, PhD 1938; National Medal of Science recipient
- K. Dane Wittrup, PhD 1988
- Peter T. Wolczanski, PhD 1981
- Mark S. Wrighton, PhD 1972; awarded MacArthur Fellowship
- Oliver R. Wulf, PhD 1926
- Yushan Yan, PhD 1997; Henry Belin du Pont Chair in Chemical and Biomolecular Engineering at the University of Delaware; elected fellow of National Academy of Inventors and National Academy of Engineering for "creativity, innovation and entrepreneurship in separation membranes and electrochemical reaction engineering, catalysis and materials"
- Ajit Yoganathan, PhD 1978; Regents' Professor, Wallace H. Coulter Distinguished Faculty Chair in Biomedical Engineering, and director, Center for Innovative Cardiovascular Technologies, Georgia Tech; member of National Academy of Engineering; known for improvements in the biomechanics of prosthetic heart valves and the development of heart repair devices
- Yannis C. Yortsos, PhD 1979
- Don Merlin Lee Yost, PhD 1926; faculty; former professor of chemistry at Caltech; pioneering physical chemist who worked on nuclear magnetic resonance, electron spin resonance, and the microwave spectroscopy of gases; member of National Academy of Sciences
- William Gould Young, PhD 1929
- Robert Zwanzig, PhD 1952

=== Biology, biological engineering, and medicine ===
- David Agard, PhD 1980
- Bruce Ames, PhD 1953; Japan Prize laureate; National Medal of Science recipient; winner of Tyler Prize for Environmental Achievement
- Thomas F. Anderson, BS 1932, PhD 1936
- Utpal Banerjee, PhD 1984
- Andrew Benson, PhD 1942
- Howard Berg, BS 1964; former faculty
- Steven Block, PhD 1983
- James F. Bonner, PhD 1934; former faculty
- C. Kevin Boyce, BS 1995; awarded MacArthur Fellowship
- Frank Brink (1910–2007), MS 1935; former professor and President of Rockefeller University; made major contributions to the understanding of neuronal activity through his targeted research on the cycle of excitation, response, and recovery in nerve fibers; member of National Academy of Sciences
- Edward Callaway, PhD 1988
- Louise Chow, PhD 1973
- Thomas Clandinin, PhD 1998; Shooter Family Professor of Neurobiology at Stanford University; elected member of American Academy of Arts and Sciences
- David A. Clayton, PhD 1970; former professor at Stanford University and former Vice President for Science Development of Howard Hughes Medical Institute; known for significant research contributions to understanding of mitochondrial genes and interplay between mitochondrial genetic mutation and human genetic disease; member of National Academy of Medicine
- David P. Corey, PhD 1980; Bertarelli Professor of Translational Medical Science and director of Bertarelli Program in Translational Neuroscience and Neuroengineering at Harvard Medical School; renowned for research into molecular and biophysical basis of sensory transduction in the inner ear, basic processes of mechanosensation in biology, leading to better understanding and treatment of hereditary deafness; Howard Hughes Medical Institute investigator; fellow of American Academy of Arts and Sciences
- Horace W. Davenport, BS 1935, PhD 1939; William Beaumont Professor Emeritus of Physiology at the University of Michigan; pioneered the study of gastroenterology and laid a foundation for more effective ulcer treatments by revealing how gastric acid works in digestion without consuming the stomach itself; member of National Academy of Sciences
- Mark M. Davis, PhD 1981; King Faisal International Prize winner; Alfred P. Sloan, Jr. Prize winner
- Ronald W. Davis, PhD 1970; Gruber Prize in Genetics winner
- Sean Eddy, BS 1986
- Michael Ehlers, BS 1991
- Sarah Elgin, PhD 1972
- Gerald D. Fasman, PhD 1952; Rosenfield Professor of Biochemistry, Brandeis University; major contributor to fundamental studies of protein structure-function relationships; member of National Academy of Sciences
- Edwin Furshpan, PhD 1955; Robert Henry Pfeiffer Professor of Neurobiology (Emeritus) at Harvard Medical School; member of National Academy of Sciences
- Michael Gazzaniga, PhD 1964
- James L. Gould, BS 1970
- Viviana Gradinaru, BS 2005
- Jack Griffith, PhD 1969; Kenan Distinguished Professor of Microbiology and Immunology and of Biochemistry and Biophysics at University of North Carolina, Chapel Hill School of Medicine; known for extensive work in visualizing and understanding DNA-protein interactions, particularly as they relate to cancer and other diseases; elected fellow of American Academy of Arts and Sciences and of National Academy of Sciences
- Leland H. Hartwell, BS 1961; Nobel laureate in physiology or medicine (2001) "for their discoveries of key regulators of the cell cycle"; Alfred P. Sloan, Jr. Prize winner; Lasker Award winner
- Stephen Heinemann, BS 1962
- Sterling B. Hendricks, PhD 1926; National Medal of Science recipient
- Ira Herskowitz, BS 1967; awarded MacArthur Fellowship
- Leonard Herzenberg, PhD 1955; Kyoto Prize laureate
- Steven A. Hillyard, BS 1964; Professor (Emeritus) of Neuroscience at UC San Diego School of Medicine; known for investigations in the area of human cognitive processes; leading figure in the electrophysiological study of human attention using the event-related potential technique; fellow of American Academy of Arts and Sciences
- David Ho, BS 1974
- David Hogness, BS 1949, PhD 1953
- Leroy Hood, BS 1960, PhD 1968; former faculty; Kyoto Prize laureate; Russ Prize winner; Lasker Award winner; National Medal of Science recipient
- Norman Horowitz, PhD 1939, former faculty
- Clyde A. Hutchison III, PhD 1968
- Harvey Itano, PhD 1950
- Lily Jan, PhD 1974, Wiley Prize recipient; Gruber Prize in Neuroscience winner
- Yuh Nung Jan, PhD 1974, Wiley Prize recipient; Gruber Prize in Neuroscience winner
- Tan Jiazhen, PhD 1937
- A. Dale Kaiser, PhD 1955, Lasker Award winner
- Lawrence C. Katz, PhD 1984
- Alfred G. Knudson, BS 1944, PhD 1956, Kyoto Prize laureate; Lasker Award winner
- Monty Krieger, PhD 1976; Whitehead Professor of Molecular Genetics at MIT; member of National Academy of Sciences
- Quynh-Thu Le, BS 1989
- Greg Lemke, PhD 1983
- Leonard Lerman, PhD 1950
- Edward B. Lewis, PhD 1942; former faculty; Nobel laureate in physiology or medicine (1995) "for their discoveries concerning the genetic control of early embryonic development"; Lasker Award winner; Wolf Prize winner; National Medal of Science recipient
- Richard S. Lewis, PhD 1985; Professor of Molecular and Cellular Physiology at Stanford University School of Medicine; elected member of National Academy of Sciences for fundamental contributions to understanding of cellular store-operated calcium ion channels and connections to immunology
- Dan Lindsley, PhD 1952
- Sharon R. Long, BS 1973, awarded MacArthur Fellowship
- John H. R. Maunsell, PhD 1982
- Robert Metzenberg, PhD 1955
- Richard D. Mooney, PhD 1991; George Barth Geller Distinguished Professor of Neurobiology and Cell Biology at Duke University; elected member of American Academy of Arts and Sciences and National Academy of Sciences
- William Newsome, PhD 1979; Dan David Prize winner
- Baldomero Olivera, PhD 1966
- Maynard Olson, BS 1965; Gruber Prize in Genetics winner
- Arthur Pardee, PhD 1947
- Ardem Patapoutian, PhD 1996; co-recipient of 2020 Kavli Prize in Neuroscience and 2021 Nobel Prize in Physiology or Medicine "for their discoveries of receptors for temperature and touch"
- John Quackenbush, BS 1983
- Charles M. Rice, PhD 1981; Albert Lasker award recipient (2016); co-recipient of 2020 Nobel Prize in Physiology or Medicine "for the discovery of Hepatitis C virus"
- Arthur Riggs, PhD 1966, geneticist
- Michael Rosbash, BS 1965; Shaw Prize laureate; Wiley Prize recipient; Gruber Prize in Neuroscience winner; co-recipient of 2017 Nobel Prize in Physiology or Medicine "for their discoveries of molecular mechanisms controlling the circadian rhythm"
- Gordon H. Sato, PhD 1955
- Michael Sheetz, PhD 1972; Wiley Prize recipient; Lasker Award recipient
- Donald C. Shreffler, PhD 1962; former professor and Chairman of Department of Genetics at Washington University in St. Louis, Washington University School of Medicine; known for contributions to immunogenetics, paving the way for detailed studies of MHC genes; elected member of National Academy of Medicine and member of National Academy of Sciences
- Frederick J. Sigworth, BS 1974; Professor of Cellular and Molecular Physiology and of Biomedical Engineering at Yale University School of Medicine; member of National Academy of Sciences
- Folke K. Skoog, BS 1932, PhD 1936; National Medal of Science recipient
- Charles M. Steinberg, PhD 1961
- F. William Studier, PhD 1963; senior scientist emeritus and former chair of Biology Department at Brookhaven National Laboratory. Elected member of National Academy of Sciences, American Academy of Arts and Sciences, and National Academy of Inventors. Recipient of Merkin Prize in Biomedical Technology and Department of Energy E.O. Lawrence Memorial Award. Known for "invention of technologies that have helped extend millions of lives through therapies, diagnostics, and vaccines; for his seminal work exploring the genetics and biochemistry of bacteriophage T7; and for his innovative techniques for high-throughput analysis of DNA, RNA, and T7 proteins."
- Howard M. Temin, PhD 1959; co-recipient of 1975 Nobel Prize in Physiology or Medicine "for their discoveries concerning the interaction between tumour viruses and the genetic material of the cell"; Lasker Award winner; National Medal of Science recipient
- Doris Tsao, BS 1996; professor of Biology at Caltech; MacArthur fellow; Kavli Prize laureate
- Albert Tyler, PhD 1929; former faculty
- David Van Essen, BS 1967; former faculty; elected member of National Academy of Sciences
- Sue VandeWoude, BS 1982; professor of Comparative Medicine and associate dean for Research in the College of Veterinary Medicine and Biomedical Sciences at Colorado State University; leading animal virologist and veterinarian; elected member of National Academy of Sciences
- Christopher Voigt, PhD 2002
- Sam Wang, BS 1986
- Ned Wingreen, BS 1984

=== Mathematics and computer science ===
- Alejandro Aceves, MS 1983
- Ian Agol, BS 1992; Breakthrough Prize laureate
- William Arveson, BS 1960
- Michael Aschbacher, BS 1966; faculty, winner of the Cole Prize in Algebra (1980) and Wolf Prize in Mathematics (2012)
- Pierre Baldi, PhD 1986
- Mihir Bellare, BS 1986
- Christopher S. Bretherton, BS 1980; professor of Applied Mathematics and Atmospheric Science at University of Washington; leading researcher in cloud formation and turbulence and computer modeling of global climate and weather forecasting; elected member of National Academy of Sciences
- Walter Bright, BS 1979
- Lawrence D. Brown, BS 1961
- Robert Calderbank, PhD 1980
- Tony F. Chan, BS/MS 1973
- Matthew Cook, PhD 2005
- Fernando J. Corbató, BS 1950; recipient of the 1990 Turing Award
- Bill Dally, PhD 1986
- James Demmel, BS 1975
- Robert Dilworth, BS 1936, PhD 1939, former faculty
- Bradley Efron, BS 1960; recipient of 2005 National Medal of Science; awarded MacArthur Fellowship
- Solomon Feferman, BS 1948
- Edward Felten, BS 1985
- Hal Finney, BS 1979
- Athanassios S. Fokas, PhD 1979
- Edray Goins, BS 1994; president of the National Association of Mathematicians
- E. Mark Gold, BS 1956
- Leonidas J. Guibas, BS/MS 1971
- John Gustafson, BS 1977
- Alfred W. Hales, BS 1960, PhD 1962
- Philip J. Hanlon, PhD 1981
- Juris Hartmanis, PhD 1955; recipient of the 1993 Turing Award
- Chandrashekhar Khare, PhD 1995
- David Kirk, PhD 1993
- Donald Knuth, PhD 1963; creator of TeX typesetting language; author of The Art of Computer Programming; recipient of the 1974 Turing Award; Kyoto Prize laureate; Harvey Prize recipient; National Medal of Science recipient
- Harold W. Kuhn, BS 1947
- Serge Lang, BS 1946
- Benoît Mandelbrot, MS 1948, Eng 1949; pioneer of fractal geometry; Japan Prize laureate; Harvey Prize recipient; Wolf Prize winner
- John McCarthy, BS 1948; inventor of the Lisp programming language and recipient of the 1971 Turing Award; Kyoto Prize laureate; National Medal of Science recipient
- Carl Morris, BS 1960, statistician
- Eugene Myers, BS 1975
- Andrew Odlyzko, BS/MS 1971
- Lior Pachter, BS 1994
- Lawrence Paulson, BS 1977
- John Platt, PhD 1989
- Irving S. Reed, BS 1944, PhD 1949; co-inventor of Reed–Solomon error correction
- John R. Rice, PhD 1959
- Neil Risch, BS 1972
- Paul W. K. Rothemund, BS 1994; awarded MacArthur Fellowship
- Tsutomu Shimomura, undergraduate studies, computational physicist and computer security expert; tracked down and helped the FBI arrest hacker Kevin Mitnick
- Peter Shor, BS 1981; King Faisal International Prize winner; awarded MacArthur Fellowship, Breakthrough Prize laureate
- Stanislav Smirnov, PhD 1996; recipient of Fields Medal in 2010
- Richard P. Stanley, BS 1966
- Harold Stark, BS 1961
- Ivan Sutherland, MS 1960; computer scientist and internet pioneer; recipient of the 1988 Turing Award for the invention of Sketchpad, an early predecessor to the graphical user interface; former faculty; Kyoto Prize laureate
- Peter Swerling, BS 1947
- Peter Szolovits, BS 1970, PhD 1975; Professor of Computer Science and Engineering and Health Sciences and Technology at MIT; known for work on application of AI methods to problems of medical decision making and design of information systems for health care institutions and patients; elected member of National Academy of Medicine
- Robert Tarjan, BS 1969; recipient of the 1986 Turing Award
- Clifford Truesdell, BS 1941, MS 1942
- Lloyd R. Welch, PhD 1958; co-inventor of the Baum-Welch algorithm
- Erik Winfree, PhD 1998; faculty; awarded MacArthur Fellowship
- W. Hugh Woodin, BS 1977

=== Engineering and applied science ===
- Rohan Abeyaratne, PhD 1979
- Allan Acosta, BS 1945, PhD 1952; former faculty; engineer; Richard L. and Dorothy M. Hayman Professor of Mechanical Engineering, Emeritus at Caltech
- Mihran S. Agbabian, MS 1948; Professor Emeritus of Engineering at the University of Southern California (USC) and President Emeritus of the American University of Armenia; member of National Academy of Engineering; known for fundamental contributions to the application of advanced methods of applied mechanics to structural design, and contributions to the field of structural response to blast and shock and the reduction of seismic hazards to existing structures
- Mohamed-Slim Alouini, PhD 1998
- George E. Apostolakis, PhD 1973, engineer; Korea Electric Power Corporation Professor of Nuclear Science and Engineering, and Professor of Engineering Systems Emeritus, at Massachusetts Institute of Technology; former Commissioner of Nuclear Regulatory Commission; known for innovations in the theory and practice of probabilistic risk assessment and risk management, particularly with regards to nuclear safety; member of National Academy of Engineering
- Irving L. Ashkenas, BS, MS 1939; distinguished aerospace engineer and cofounder of Systems Technology, Inc.; elected member of National Academy of Engineering; known for leadership in flying qualities theory and practice, and for contributions to flight control systems and aerospace vehicle system design
- Michael Aziz, BS 1978; the Gene and Tracy Sykes Professor of Materials and Energy Technologies at the Harvard John A. Paulson School of Engineering and Applied Sciences
- Mary Baker, PhD 1972; Chairman and President of ATA Engineering Inc.; elected member of National Academy of Engineering for computer simulation methods for structural mechanics problems and engineering leadership
- William F. Ballhaus, Sr., PhD 1947
- Michael I. Baskes, BS 1965, PhD 1970; member of National Academy of Engineering; materials engineer known for contributions to the embedded atom method for predicting the structure and properties of metals and alloys
- Robert L. Behnken, PhD 1997, NASA astronaut, flew on STS-123
- Jacobo Bielak, PhD 1971
- Maurice Anthony Biot, PhD 1932
- Pratim Biswas, PhD 1985
- Alexandria Boehm, BS 1996
- Frank Borman, MS 1957; NASA astronaut, commanded Gemini 7 and Apollo 8 space missions
- Robert W. Bower, PhD 1973
- James E. Broadwell, MS 1944; research scientist in aeronautical engineering; elected member of National Academy of Engineering for contributions to the understanding and management of turbulent mixing with application to chemical laser design
- Norman H. Brooks, PhD 1954; former faculty; James Irvine Professor of Environmental and Civil Engineering, Emeritus at Caltech; member of National Academy of Sciences and National Academy of Engineering; expert in hydraulic engineering, environmental fluid mechanics, and water resources and technology
- Arthur E. Bryson, PhD 1951
- Sébastien Candel, PhD 1972
- Brian J. Cantwell, PhD 1976; Edward C. Wells Professor of Engineering (Aeronautics and Astronautics) at Stanford University; member of National Academy of Engineering; known for studies of the space-time structure of turbulent flows and for the development of fast-burning fuels for hybrid propulsion
- Gregory Chamitoff, MS 1985; NASA astronaut, flew on STS-124 and stayed on Expedition 17 on the International Space Station
- Dean Roden Chapman, BS 1944, PhD 1948
- Uma Chowdhry, MS 1970
- Deborah Chung, BS/MS 1973
- Francis H. Clauser, BS 1934, PhD 1937; former faculty; Clark Blanchard Millikan Professor of Engineering, Emeritus at Caltech; pioneer in the study of boundary layer theory, turbulent flows, guided missiles, spacecraft, magnetohydrodynamics, and partial differential equations; member of National Academy of Engineering
- Ray W. Clough, MS 1943; National Medal of Science recipient
- Julian Cole, PhD 1949; former faculty
- Donald E. Coles, PhD 1953; former faculty; Professor of Aeronautics, Emeritus at Caltech; contributed to study of supersonic and turbulent boundary layer flows, Couette flows, and fluid flow instrumentation design; member of National Academy of Engineering
- Robert Conn, PhD 1968; President of the Kavli Foundation and Zable Professor and Dean, Emeritus, of the Jacobs School of Engineering at UC San Diego; leading researcher in plasma physics, fusion energy, energy policy and materials science; member of National Academy of Engineering and recipient of E.O. Lawrence award from Department of Energy
- Stanley Corrsin, PhD 1947
- Charles Crouse, PhD 1974; Principal Engineer at AECOM. Elected member of National Academy of Engineering "for contributions to public safety and infrastructure resilience through leadership in transferring research advances into seismic design practice."
- Slobodan Ćuk, PhD 1977; inventor of Ćuk switched-mode DC-to-DC voltage converter; former professor of Electrical Engineering at Caltech
- John Dabiri, PhD 2005, Centennial Chair Professor of Aeronautics and Mechanical Engineering at Caltech; awarded MacArthur Fellowship; recipient of National Medal of Science
- James Wallace Daily, PhD 1945, Professor of Fluid Mechanics and Hydraulic Engineering Emeritus, at University of Michigan; former professor at MIT; known for contributions to fluid mechanics and hydraulic engineering, especially in the areas of cavitation, hydraulic machinery, the flow of suspensions, and the design of fluid-mechanics laboratories; member of National Academy of Engineering
- Raffaello D'Andrea, MS, PhD 1997
- Frank W. Davis, BS 1936; engineer, test pilot, and executive with Convair and General Dynamics; elected member of National Academy of Engineering; known for design, development, and testing of supersonic aircraft and missile systems
- Satish Dhawan, PhD 1951
- Paul Dimotakis, BS 1968, PhD 1973; faculty; John K. Northrop Professor of Aeronautics and Professor of Applied Physics at Caltech and senior research scientist at JPL; former chief technologist at JPL; known for contributions to the fluid mechanics of jet propulsion and other processes involving turbulence, mixing, and transport; member of National Academy of Engineering
- James Duderstadt, PhD 1967, National Medal of Technology and Innovation recipient
- Regina E. Dugan, PhD 1993, 19th director of DARPA, first female director
- Dean B. Edwards, PhD 1977; professor of Chemical and Materials Engineering, Emeritus at University of Idaho; noted researcher in electric vehicle battery research; elected member of National Academy of Inventors
- Charles Elachi, PhD 1971, former faculty
- Julie S. Eng, BS 1989; Chief Technology Officer for Coherent Corp. Elected member of National Academy of Engineering "for contributions to high-speed optoelectronic devices and modules."
- Nader Engheta, PhD 1982
- Richard G. Folsom, BS 1928, PhD 1933
- C. Gordon Fullerton, BS 1957, MS 1958, Space Shuttle astronaut and test pilot
- Yuan-Cheng Fung, PhD 1948; Russ Prize winner; National Medal of Science recipient
- Morteza Gharib, PhD 1983; faculty; Vice Provost for Research and Hans W. Liepmann Professor of Aeronautics and Bioinspired Engineering at Caltech
- Edward Gibson, MS 1960, PhD 1964, NASA astronaut, flew on Skylab 4
- Roy W. Gould, BS 1949, PhD 1956, former faculty; Simon Ramo Professor of Engineering, Emeritus at Caltech; made several important contributions to field of plasma physics; member of National Academy of Sciences and National Academy of Engineering
- Meredith Gourdine, PhD 1960
- Wallace D. Hayes, PhD 1947
- R. Richard Heppe, A.Eng (Degree of Aeronautical Engineer) 1947; retired vice president at Lockheed Corporation; elected member of National Academy of Engineering; known for significant contributions to aerodynamics, design, and disciplined technical management of numerous military and commercial aircraft developments
- George W. Housner, PhD 1941; former faculty; Carl F Braun Professor of Engineering, Emeritus at Caltech; National Medal of Science recipient
- Tsien Hsue-shen, PhD 1939, "father of China's rocket program"
- Donald E. Hudson, BS 1938, PhD 1942, Professor of Mechanical Engineering and Applied Mechanics, Emeritus at Caltech
- Arthur T. Ippen, PhD 1936
- Wilfred D. Iwan, BS 1957, PhD 1961, former faculty; Professor of Applied Mechanics, Emeritus at Caltech; major contributor to theory of vibrations, modeling of structural systems, nonlinear system identification, machinery dynamics and vibration, earthquake response of structures, earthquake response of nonstructural components, engineering seismology, offshore drilling, and public policy for earthquake risk mitigation; member of National Academy of Engineering
- Ali Jadbabaie, PhD 2000
- Sudhir K. Jain, PhD 1983
- Paul C. Jennings, PhD 1963, former faculty; Professor of Civil Engineering and Applied Mechanics, Emeritus at Caltech; authority on earthquake engineering and dynamics of structures, including high-rise buildings, offshore drilling towers, and nuclear power plants; member of National Academy of Engineering and fellow of American Academy of Arts and Science
- William L Johnson, PhD 1975, faculty; Ruben F. and Donna Mettler Professor of Engineering and Applied Science at Caltech; made major contributions to study of bulk metallic glasses; member of National Academy of Sciences and National Academy of Engineering
- Ann Karagozian, PhD 1982, Distinguished Professor of Mechanical and Aerospace Engineering, University of California, Los Angeles (UCLA); recognized for important research contributions to combustion and propulsion as well as education and service to profession; elected member of National Academy of Engineering
- Joseph Katz, PhD 1982
- Leon M. Keer; BS 1956, MS 1958, Walter P. Murphy Professor of Civil Engineering at Northwestern University; known for research on application of elasticity to design problems involving contact and fracture; member of National Academy of Engineering
- Jack Kerrebrock, PhD 1956, Richard Cockburn Maclaurin Professor Emeritus, former head of the Aeronautics and Astronautics Department, and former dean of School of Engineering at Massachusetts Institute of Technology; known for work on nuclear rockets, space propulsion and power, magneto hydrodynamic generators, and fluid mechanics of turbomachinery for aircraft engines; member of National Academy of Engineering
- Tobias J. Kippenberg, PhD 2004, Professor of Physics at EPFL (École Polytechnique Fédérale de Lausanne, or Swiss Federal Institute of Technology in Lausanne); elected member of National Academy of Engineering for "development and commercialization of chip-scale optical frequency combs"
- Wolfgang Knauss, BS 1958, PhD 1963; Theodore von Karman Professor of Aeronautics and Applied Mechanics, Emeritus at Caltech
- Thomas L. Koch, PhD 1982, dean of the College of Optical Sciences; professor of Optical Sciences and professor of Electrical and Computer Engineering at the University of Arizona; former senior researcher at Bell Labs; known for contributions to optoelectronic technologies and their implementation in optical communications systems, exploring the fundamental performance limits of lasers used for telecommunications, and for the design and demonstration of semiconductor photonic integrated circuits; member of National Academy of Engineering, fellow of IEEE, and fellow of OSA
- Petros Koumoutsakos, PhD 1993, Professor and Chair of Computational Science at ETH Zurich, Switzerland; known for important contributions to computational methods and simulations for fluid mechanics, nanotechnology, and biology; elected member of US National Academy of Engineering
- Mark Kryder, PhD 1970
- Thomas F. Kuech, PhD 1981, Milton J. and A. Maude Shoemaker and Beckwith-Bascom Professor and Chair, Chemical and Biological Engineering, University of Wisconsin-Madison; member of National Academy of Engineering; known for contributions to chemical vapor deposition of compound semiconductors
- Mark Kushner, PhD 1979; George I Haddad Collegiate Professor of Engineering at University of Michigan, Ann Arbor; elected member of National Academy of Engineering; known for contributions to low-temperature plasmas for semiconductors, optics, and thin-film manufacturing
- Stelios Kyriakides, PhD 1980; Cockrell Family Chair Professor in Engineering, University of Texas-Austin; known for contributions to micro- and macro- mechanical behavior of solids, particularly understanding of propagating instability phenomena in structures and materials and its use for technological applications; member of National Academy of Engineering
- Kam Y. Lau, BS 1978, PhD 1981; Emeritus Professor of Electrical Engineering and Computer Science, University of California, Berkeley. Elected member of National Academy of Engineering "for contributions to semiconductor lasers and radio frequency over fiber (RFoF) systems."
- Sidney Leibovich, BS 1961, Samuel B. Eckert Professor of Mechanical Engineering at Cornell University; known for seminal contributions to theory and application of stability, wave propagation, vortices, and the ocean surface layer; member of National Academy of Engineering; fellow of American Academy of Arts and Sciences
- Anthony E. Leonard, BS 1959, PhD 1963, former faculty; Theodore von Karman Professor of Aeronautics, Emeritus at Caltech; known for contributions to simulation of turbulence, new vortex methods of flow simulation, and understanding of flow-induced vibration; member of National Academy of Engineering
- Yiannis Levendis, PhD 1987; Distinguished Professor of Mechanical and Industrial Engineering at Northeastern University; elected member of National Academy of Inventors; expert in fuel combustion and pollution analysis
- Fei-Fei Li, PhD 2005
- York Liao, BS 1967
- Chia-Chiao Lin, PhD 1944
- Amable Liñán, A.Eng (Degree of Aeronautical Engineer) 1963
- Fred Lindvall, PhD 1928, former faculty; Professor of Electrical Engineering at Caltech and Chair of Division of Engineering & Applied Science; President of Sigma Xi; President of American Society for Engineering Education; member of National Academy of Sciences and National Academy of Engineering; fellow of ASME and fellow of IEEE; known for research and development of equipment for transportation and underwater ordinance
- David Luenberger, BS 1959
- Paul MacCready, PhD 1952, father of human-powered flight; invented the Gossamer Condor and the Gossamer Albatross
- Artur Mager, PhD 1953; prominent aerospace executive and former president of American Institute of Aeronautics and Astronautics (AIAA); elected member of National Academy of Engineering; known for contributions in turbulent flow aerodynamics and engineering leadership to space and missile programs
- Frank Malina, PhD 1940
- Subbaiah Malladi, PhD 1980, Chief Technical Officer and Principal Engineer for Exponent. Elected member of National Academy of Engineering "for contributions to critical national-transportation-safety-related investigations and safety regulation enforcement."
- Frank E. Marble, PhD 1948, former faculty; Richard L. and Dorothy M. Hayman Professor of Mechanical Engineering and Professor of Jet Propulsion, Emeritus at Caltech
- Max Mathews, BS 1950
- Frank A. McClintock, PhD 1950
- Robert McEliece, BS 1964, PhD 1967, former faculty; Allen E. Puckett Professor of Electrical Engineering, Emeritus at Caltech
- Duane T. McRuer, BS 1945, MS 1948; distinguished aerospace engineer, executive, and co-founder of Systems Technology, Inc.; elected member of National Academy of Engineering; known for pioneering application of guidance and control theory and to experimental man-machine interactions
- Carver Mead, BS 1956, PhD 1959; former faculty; Gordon and Betty Moore Professor of Engineering and Applied Science, Emeritus at Caltech; National Medal of Technology and Innovation recipient; Kyoto Prize winner
- Chiang C. Mei, PhD 1963
- John W. Miles, BS 1942, PhD 1944
- Richard Miller, PhD 1976, President of Franklin W. Olin College of Engineering
- Clark Blanchard Millikan, PhD 1928, former faculty
- William W. Moore, BS, MS, 1934; distinguished civil and geotechnical engineer who co-founded prominent consulting engineering firm Dames & Moore; elected member of National Academy of Engineering; known for pioneering contributions in the field of geotechnical engineering and to knowledge of earth sciences and soil engineering
- Richard S. Muller, PhD 1962
- Richard M. Murray, BS 1985, engineer; Thomas and Doris Everhart Professor of Control and Dynamical Systems and Bioengineering at Caltech; known for contributions in control theory and networked control systems with applications to aerospace engineering, robotics, autonomy, and biological circuits; member of National Academy of Engineering
- Roddam Narasimha, PhD 1961
- Shouleh Nikzad, PhD 1990
- Bernard M. Oliver, PhD 1940, National Medal of Science recipient
- James F. Pankow, PhD 1979
- William Hayward Pickering, BS 1932, PhD 1936; former faculty; Japan Prize laureate; National Medal of Science recipient
- John R. Pierce, BS 1933, PhD 1936, former faculty; Japan Prize laureate; Charles Stark Draper Prize winner; National Medal of Science recipient
- Zoya Popovic, PhD 1990; Distinguished Professor and Lockheed Martin Endowed Chair, Electrical Computer and Energy Engineering, University of Colorado, Boulder; elected fellow of National Academy of Engineering for "developing high-efficiency microwave transmitters and active antenna arrays for wireless communication systems and for engineering education"
- Andrea Prosperetti, PhD 1974
- Allen E. Puckett, PhD 1949, contributed greatly to the delta-winged airplane, the guided missile, and the communications satellite; Chairman and CEO of Hughes Aircraft who helped develop its predominance in radar systems and defense electronics during his career; past president of American Institute of Aeronautics and Astronautics; elected member of National Academy of Engineering and National Academy of Sciences; won Lawrence Sperry award of American Institute of Aeronautics and Astronautics; National Medal of Technology and Innovation recipient
- Simon Ramo, PhD 1936, co-founder of TRW; developed ICBMs; National Medal of Science recipient; Presidential Medal of Freedom recipient
- W. Duncan Rannie, PhD 1951; former faculty; Robert H. Goddard Professor of Jet Propulsion, Emeritus at Caltech; known for contributions to three-dimensional flow, stall and distortion in turbomachinery and to turbulent heat transfer; member of National Academy of Engineering
- Gabriel M. Rebeiz, PhD 1988
- Garrett Reisman, MS 1992, PhD 1997, NASA astronaut, flew on STS-123 and was part of expedition 16 on the International Space Station; returned to Earth on STS-124
- Eli Reshotko, PhD 1960; Kent H. Smith Professor Emeritus of Engineering at Case Western Reserve University; elected member of National Academy of Engineering; known for contributions to the understanding of transition to turbulence in high-speed flows and non-homogeneous flows
- Ignacio Rodriguez-Iturbe, MS 1965
- Harold Rosen, MS 1948, PhD 1951, developer of Syncom family of communication satellites; winner of National Medal of Technology 1985
- Anatol Roshko, PhD 1952, Theodore von Kármán Professor of Aeronautics, Emeritus at Caltech; former faculty
- Darrell G. Schlom, BS 1984, Herbert Fisk Johnson Professor of Industrial Chemistry at Cornell University; known for molecular-beam epitaxy "materials-by-design" of complex oxides impacting the integration of high dielectric oxides in semiconductor devices; elected member of National Academy of Engineering
- Harris M. Schurmeier, BS, MS, A.Eng (Degree of Aeronautical Engineer) 1949; recipient of NASA Distinguished Service Medal, NASA Exceptional Service Medal, and NASA Exceptional Scientific Achievement Medal; aerospace engineer who served in many leadership positions at NASA's Jet Propulsion Laboratory and as project manager of several interplanetary missions; elected member of National Academy of Engineering; known for engineering leadership in explorations of the Solar System
- Richard A. Searfoss, MS 1979, NASA astronaut, flew on STS-58 and STS-76, commander of STS-90
- William R. Sears, PhD 1938
- Ernest Edwin Sechler, BS 1928, PhD 1933, former faculty
- Joseph E. Shepherd, PhD 1981; C.L. "Kelly" Johnson Professor of Aeronautics and Mechanical Engineering, Emeritus. Elected member of National Academy of Engineering "for contributions to the understanding of detonation waves and to mitigating explosion hazards in air transportation systems and nuclear facilities."
- Ozires Silva, MS 1966
- Edward E. Simmons, BS 1934, MS 1936
- George E. Solomon, PhD 1952; prominent aeronautical engineer who rose up the ranks to become corporate executive vice president and general manager of the Electronics and Defense Sector of TRW, Inc.; elected member of National Academy of Engineering; known for contributions to the design and development of space and weapon systems
- Pol Spanos, PhD 1976, engineer; Lewis B. Ryon Professor of Mechanical Engineering and Civil Engineering at Rice University; known for pioneering research into the development of methods of predicting the dynamic behavior and reliability of structural systems in diverse loading environments; research has studied statics, dynamics, and vibrations of systems for aerospace, biomedical, forensic, marine, petroleum, seismic, and structural engineering applications; member of National Academy of Engineering; fellow of American Academy of Arts and Sciences
- Adam Steltzner, MS 1991
- David W. Thompson, MS 1978, National Medal of Technology and Innovation recipient
- Stephen Trimberger, BS 1977, PhD 1983
- Hsue-Shen Tsien (as he was known in the US before 1950, or Qian Xuesen as he was known in China after 1950; family name is transliterated as Tsien or as Qian), PhD 1939, co-founder of the Jet Propulsion Laboratory and is known as the "Father of Chinese space program" and the "Father of Chinese Rocketry"
- Kerry Vahala, BS 1980, MS 1981, PhD 1985; Ted and Ginger Jenkins chair of Information Science and Technology and Applied Physics at Caltech
- Milton Van Dyke, PhD 1949
- Vito Vanoni, BS 1926, PhD 1940, former faculty; Professor of Hydraulics, Emeritus at Caltech; world leader in study of sediment transport in streams and rivers; elected to National Academy of Engineering for leadership in developing the science of hydraulic sedimentation mechanics and applying it to construction and maintenance of engineering structures
- Jelena Vučković, PhD 2002
- Ian Waitz, PhD 1991, Dean of Engineering at Massachusetts Institute of Technology
- Forman A. Williams, PhD 1958
- Max L. Williams, PhD 1950, former faculty; Professor of Aeronautics at Caltech; leader in fields of fracture mechanics, adhesion, solid propellant rockets; founder of International Journal of Fracture; member of National Academy of Engineering
- Victor Wouk, PhD 1942
- Susan Wu, PhD 1963
- Theodore Y. Wu, PhD 1952, former faculty
- Vigor Yang, PhD 1984, William R.T. Oakes Professor and Chair of the Daniel Guggenheim School of Aerospace Engineering at Georgia Institute of Technology (Georgia Tech); member of National Academy of Engineering; known for contributions to combustion physics in propulsion systems and to aerospace engineering education
- Zheng Zhemin, PhD 1952
- Theodore Zoli, MS 1989; awarded MacArthur Fellowship

=== Geological, environmental, and planetary sciences ===
- Thomas J. Ahrens, MS 1958, former faculty
- Clarence Allen, PhD 1954, faculty
- Don L. Anderson, PhD 1962, former faculty; Crafoord Prize Laureate in Geosciences, 1998; National Medal of Science recipient
- Charles Archambeau, PhD 1964, former faculty; awarded MacArthur Fellowship
- Hugo Benioff, PhD 1935, former faculty
- Joel D. Blum, PhD 1990
- Emily Brodsky, PhD 2001
- Francis Anthony Dahlen (1942–2007), BS 1964, pioneering theoretical seismologist and professor at Princeton University; member of National Academy of Sciences
- Donald J. DePaolo, PhD 1978
- Gordon P. Eaton, PhD 1957
- Richard Lawrence Edwards, PhD 1988; recipient of National Medal of Science
- Thomas C. Hanks, PhD 1972
- Stanley R. Hart, MS 1957, Senior Scientist, Department of Geology and Geophysics, Woods Hole Oceanographic Institution; former professor of earth, atmospheric, and planetary sciences at MIT; former president of Geochemical Society; member of National Academy of Sciences and fellow of American Academy of Arts and Sciences
- Thomas H. Heaton, PhD 1978
- Raymond Jeanloz, PhD 1979, awarded MacArthur Fellowship
- Thomas H. Jordan, BS 1969, PhD 1972
- Barclay Kamb, BS 1952, PhD 1956, former faculty
- Susan Kieffer, PhD 1971, awarded MacArthur Fellowship
- Leon Knopoff, BS 1944, PhD 1949; former faculty
- Randal Koster, BS 1982; Research Scientist, NASA Goddard Space Flight Center. Elected member of National Academy of Engineering "for contributions to land surface models that track hydrologic and atmospheric variability through data assimilation."
- Thorne Lay, PhD 1983
- Laurie Leshin, PhD 1994
- Jonathan Lunine, PhD 1985
- Michael C. Malin, PhD 1975, awarded MacArthur Fellowship
- William B. McKinnon, PhD 1981; Professor of Earth and Planetary Sciences at Washington University in St. Louis; elected member of National Academy of Sciences
- James C. McWilliams, BS 1968
- Mark Meier, PhD 1957
- H. Jay Melosh, PhD 1972
- Henry William Menard, BS 1942, MS 1947
- François M. M. Morel, PhD 1971; winner of 2010 ENI environmental award
- Walter Munk, BS 1939, MS 1940, Crafoord Prize Laureate in Geosciences, 2010; Kyoto Prize laureate; National Medal of Science recipient
- Richard J. O'Connell, BS 1963, PhD 1969
- Tullis Onstott, BS 1976
- Carolyn Porco, PhD 1983
- Richard J. Reed (1922–2008), BS 1945, Professor Emeritus of Atmospheric Sciences at University of Washington; member of National Academy of Sciences
- Paul G. Richards, PhD 1970, awarded MacArthur Fellowship
- Charles Francis Richter, PhD 1928, former faculty, creator of the Richter scale
- George R. Rossman, PhD 1971, faculty, Dana Medal and Roebling Medal recipient
- Harrison Schmitt, BS 1957, astronaut and US Senator, the only geologist to walk on the Moon
- Robert P. Sharp, BS 1934, MS 1935, former faculty; National Medal of Science recipient
- Eugene Merle Shoemaker, BS 1947, MS 1948, former faculty; co-discoverer of Comet Shoemaker-Levy 9; National Medal of Science recipient
- Leon Silver, PhD 1955, former faculty
- Sean Solomon, BS 1966, National Medal of Science recipient
- Sarah T. Stewart-Mukhopadhyay, PhD 2002; MacArthur Fellow
- Hugh P. Taylor Jr., BS 1954, PhD 1959; former faculty; Robert P. Sharp Professor of Geology, Emeritus Caltech
- Leon Thomsen, BS 1964; Research Professor of Geophysics at University of Houston and Chief Scientist, Delta Geophysics, Inc.; elected fellow of National Academy of Engineering for "contributions to seismic anisotropy concepts that produced major advances in subsurface analysis"
- Donald L. Turcotte, BS 1954, PhD 1958
- John Vidale, PhD 1987
- Benjamin P. Weiss, PhD 2003; Robert R. Shrock Professor of Earth and Planetary Sciences, MIT. Elected member of National Academy of Sciences for contributions to planetary sciences, particularly paleomagnetism and geomagnetism.

=== Business ===
- Dario Amodei, undergraduate studies (transferred out) in physics; CEO of Anthropic
- Sabeer Bhatia, BS 1989; co-founder of Hotmail
- Chester Carlson, BS 1930; inventor of electrophotography, the foundation of Xerox
- John S. Chen, MS 1979
- Adam D'Angelo, BS 2006; former CTO of Facebook; founder and current CEO of Quora
- George T. Felbeck, PhD 1943; president of Union Carbide from 1944-1962
- Jim Fruchterman, BS/MS 1980; awarded MacArthur Fellowship
- Bill T. Gross, BS 1981; founder of business incubator Idealab
- Gary Guthart, PhD 1992; Executive Chair of Board of Directors (and former CEO) of Intuitive Surgical. Elected member of National Academy of Engineering "for engineering leadership in the creation of surgical robotic systems and their usage to improve patient care."
- Eddy Hartenstein, MS 1974
- Osman Kibar, BS 1993
- Ruben F. Mettler, BS 1944, PhD 1949; Chairman and Chief Executive Officer of TRW Inc., 1977-1988
- Cleve Moler, BS 1961; inventor of MATLAB, co-founder of MathWorks, influential in the field of numerical analysis
- Gordon E. Moore, PhD 1954; co-founder of Intel Corp.; author of Moore's law; Dan David Prize winner; National Medal of Technology and Innovation recipient; Presidential Medal of Freedom recipient
- John Morris, PhD 1996; Executive Vice President and Chief Technology Officer (CTO), Seagate Technology. Elected member of National Academy of Engineering "for contributions in industrial application of robust control in hard disk drives, enabling high areal densities and disk drive capacity."
- Charlie Munger, undergraduate studies (did not graduate); investor and vice-chairman of Berkshire Hathaway Corporation
- Benjamin M. Rosen, BS 1954; former chairman of Compaq
- Ozires Silva, MS 1966
- Cliff Spiro, PhD 1981; former CTO at Cabot Microelectronics and former VP of R&D at Ondeo-Nalco; elected to National Academy of Engineering for "technical leadership in diverse fields ranging from combustion to microelectronics and medical technologies"
- Michael Thien, BS 1982; Senior Vice President and Head of Pharmaceutical Sciences R&D, Takeda Pharmaceuticals. Former Senior Vice President at Merck. Elected member of National Academy of Engineering "for innovations in supply chain design and engineering of large-scale manufacture of drugs for treating HIV, cancer, and diabetes."
- Dean Wooldridge, PhD 1936

=== Economics, finance, and social science ===
- Robert Barro, BS 1965
- Gary W. Cox, BS 1978, PhD 1982
- Arthur Lupia, PhD 1991
- Willard G. Manning, Jr., BS 1968; Professor Emeritus, Irving B. Harris Graduate School of Public Policy Studies, and Department of Health Studies, Biological Science Division/Medical School - University of Chicago; elected member of National Academy of Medicine; distinguished researcher in field of health insurance research and healthcare economics
- Lisa Martin, BS 1983
- Robert C. Merton, MS 1967; recipient of Sveriges Riksbank Prize in Economic Sciences in Memory of Alfred Nobel (aka Nobel Prize in Economics) (1997) "for a new method to determine the value of derivatives"
- Roger Noll, BS 1962
- Thomas Palfrey, PhD 1981; Flintridge Professor of Economics and Political Science at Caltech
- Stephen Ross, BS 1965
- Mark Satterthwaite, BS 1967
- Vernon L. Smith, BS 1949; recipient of Sveriges Riksbank Prize in Economic Sciences in Memory of Alfred Nobel (aka Nobel Prize in Economics) (2002) "for having established laboratory experiments as a tool in empirical economic analysis, especially in the study of alternative market mechanisms"
- Barry Weingast, PhD 1978

=== Government and politics ===
- Mustafa A.G. Abushagur, PhD 1984; interim Deputy Prime Minister of Libya from 2011
- Moshe Arens, MS 1953; former Israeli defense minister and foreign minister
- Joseph V. Charyk, PhD 1946; National Medal of Technology and Innovation recipient
- William Colglazier, PhD 1971
- France A. Córdova, PhD 1979; 14th Director of the National Science Foundation (NSF); former president of Purdue University and former Chancellor of University of California, Riverside
- Richard D. DeLauer, PhD 1953; member of National Academy of Engineering; Under Secretary of Defense for Research and Engineering in President Ronald Reagan's cabinet; Executive Vice President of TRW Inc.
- Steingrímur Hermannsson, MS 1952; former Prime Minister of Iceland
- Erdal İnönü, PhD 1951; deputy prime minister of Turkey, 1991–1993
- Khurram Dastgir Khan, BS 1993; former minister for Defence, Pakistan
- David J. C. MacKay, PhD 1992
- Jessica Mathews, PhD 1973; former director of the Office of Global Issues of the National Security Council; founding vice president and former director of Research of the World Resources Institute; former senior fellow at Council on Foreign Relations; former president of Carnegie Endowment for International Peace
- Raymond L. Orbach, BS 1956; former chancellor of University of California, Riverside; first under secretary for Science and former director of Office of Science at Department of Energy
- John M. Poindexter, PhD 1964; director of DARPA Information Awareness Office; National Security Advisor to Ronald Reagan
- Arati Prabhakar, PhD 1984; first woman to head National Institute of Standards and Technology (NIST) and former director of United States Defense Advanced Research Projects Agency (DARPA)
- Eberhardt Rechtin, BS 1946, PhD 1950; director of DARPA; Assistant Secretary of Defense; chief engineer of Hewlett-Packard; president of the Aerospace Corporation
- Joseph Rhodes, Jr., BS 1969
- Ted Taylor, BS 1945
- Victor Veysey, BS 1936; former Republican U.S. congressman from California and assistant secretary for Civil Works for the U.S. Army
- Ellen D. Williams, PhD 1981; former chief scientist at BP and former director of ARPA-E

=== Other fields ===
- Bert Acosta, undergraduate studies, early aviator
- David Brin, BS 1973; science fiction author
- Jose I. Cabezon, BS 1978; XIVth Dalai Lama Professor of Tibetan Buddhism and Cultural Studies, University of California, Santa Barbara; world leading researcher in Tibetan Buddhist philosophy and culture; Guggenheim fellow and elected fellow of American Academy of Arts and Sciences
- Frank Capra, BS 1918; filmmaker, director of such classics as It's a Wonderful Life, winner of six Academy Awards
- Pierre Clostermann, undergraduate studies, French WW2 flying ace, author
- Jess Collins, BS 1948; visual artist
- L. Sprague de Camp, BS 1930; science fiction author
- Michaeleen Doucleff, BS 1998; science reporter at NPR (National Public Radio), former editorial staff at Cell Press
- Su Guaning
- Jim Hall, BS 1958; race car driver and founder of the Chaparral racing team
- Kristy Hawkins, PhD 2008; professional female bodybuilder
- N. Katherine Hayles, MS 1966; critical theorist
- Herman Kahn, graduate studies; futurist and military strategist
- Robert J. Lang, PhD; physicist and renowned origami master
- Alan Lightman, PhD 1974; physicist and novelist
- Sandra Tsing Loh, BS 1983; writer, performer, musician, humorist
- Samuel Lunden, BS 1918; architecture
- Harold McGee, BS 1973; pioneer in science-based approach to cooking
- Larry Niven, undergraduate studies, science fiction writer
- Dean Oliver, statistician
- Aza Raskin, graduate studies, design expert, interface guru, and entrepreneur
- Huck Seed, undergraduate studies, professional poker player, winner of the main event of the 1996 World Series of Poker
- Mark Serrurier
- Joe Trela, third contestant to win $1 million grand prize on Who Wants to Be a Millionaire
- Harry Turtledove, undergraduate studies, historian and fiction writer
- Telle Whitney, PhD 1985; computer scientist and co-founder and CEO of the Anita Borg Institute

== Notable faculty ==
Members of the faculty are listed under the name of the academic division to which they belong.

=== Current faculty ===
Current members of the faculty are listed by divisions. Alumnus degrees are depicted in italic type.

==== Biology and biological engineering ====
current faculty emeritus faculty

Alumnus degrees are depicted in italic type.

- Richard A. Andersen, neuroscientist
- David J. Anderson, neurobiologist
- Pamela J. Bjorkman, immunologist and molecular biologist, L'Oréal-UNESCO Awards for Women in Science winner; recipient of Wolf Prize
- Marianne Bronner, developmental biologist
- Michael Dickinson, bioengineer, awarded MacArthur Fellowship
- Michael Elowitz, molecular biologist and bioengineer, awarded MacArthur Fellowship
- David Glover, geneticist
- Viviana Gradinaru, neuroscientist and biological engineer
- Mitchell Guttman, molecular biologist
- Alice S. Huang, microbiologist and virologist
- Mary B. Kennedy, biochemist and neuroscientist
- Henry A. Lester, neuroscientist
- Stephen L. Mayo, structural biologist and protein design
- Sarkis Mazmanian, immunologist and microbiologist, MacArthur fellow
- Margaret McFall-Ngai, animal physiologist and biochemist
- Elliot Meyerowitz, geneticist and developmental biologist, Balzan Prize recipient; Gruber Prize in Genetics winner; Wolf Prize winner
- Richard M. Murray, synthetic biologist
- Dianne Newman, molecular microbiologist
- Victoria Orphan, geobiologist
- Lior Pachter, computational biologist
- Joseph Parker, evolutionary biologist
- Rob B. Phillips, biophysicist
- Lulu Qian, bioengineer
- Ellen Rothenberg, immunologist
- Edward G. Ruby, microbiologist
- Paul W. Sternberg, geneticist
- Matt Thomson, computational biologist
- Alexander Varshavsky, biochemist and geneticist, King Faisal International Prize winner; Alfred P. Sloan, Jr. Prize winner; Albany Medical Center Prize winner; Lasker Award winner; Breakthrough Prize laureate; Wolf Prize winner
- Erik Winfree, PhD 1998, DNA computing and DNA nanotechnology
- Barbara Wold, PhD 1978, molecular biologist
- Magdalena Żernicka-Goetz, developmental biologist

==== Chemistry and chemical engineering ====
current faculty emeritus faculty

Alumnus degrees are depicted in italic type.

- Frances Arnold, Millennium Technology Prize winner; Charles Stark Draper Prize winner; National Medal of Technology and Innovation recipient; Nobel laureate in chemistry (2018) "for the directed evolution of enzymes"
- John F. Brady, chemical engineer
- Garnet K.-L. Chan, theoretical chemist
- Bil Clemons, biochemist
- Sujit Datta, chemical engineer, bioengineer, and biophysist
- Dennis A. Dougherty, physical organic chemist
- Richard Flagan, chemical engineer, major contributor to aerosol science and technology and atmospheric chemistry; member of National Academy of Engineering
- Gregory Fu, organic chemist
- William Andrew Goddard III, PhD 1964, theoretical chemist
- Harry Gray, inorganic chemist, winner of National Medal of Science (1986), Wolf Prize in Chemistry (2004), and Priestley Medal (1991); founding director of the Beckman Institute; Harvey Prize recipient
- James R. Heath, chemist, Sackler Prize winner
- André Hoelz, biochemist
- Linda Hsieh-Wilson, biochemist
- Rustem F. Ismagilov, chemist
- Julia A. Kornfield, BS 1983, MS 1984, chemical engineer
- Nathan Lewis, BS/MS 1977, chemist
- Rudolph Marcus, Nobel laureate in chemistry (1992) "for his contributions to the theory of electron transfer reactions in chemical systems"; Wolf Prize winner; National Medal of Science recipient
- Stephen L. Mayo, biochemist
- Jonas C. Peters, chemist
- Douglas C. Rees, biochemist, biophysicist, and structural biologist, eminent X-ray crystallographer and structural biochemist specializing in membrane proteins and metalloproteins, especially involved in bioenergetics; HHMI Investigator; member of National Academy of Sciences and fellow of American Academy of Arts and Sciences
- Sarah E. Reisman, chemist, division chair
- Shu-ou Shan, biochemist
- Brian Stoltz, chemist
- David A. Tirrell, chemist
- Zhen-Gang Wang - Dick and Barbara Dickinson Professor of Chemical Engineering; recipient of Polymer Physics Prize of American Physical Society; elected member of National Academy of Engineering "for unifying theories of thermodynamic and transport properties of polymers to predict phase behavior, self-assembly, and nucleation."

==== Engineering and applied science ====
current faculty research faculty emeritus faculty

Alumnus degrees are depicted in italic type.

- Yaser Abu-Mostafa, electrical engineer and computer scientist
- Aaron D. Ames, mechanical and civil engineer
- Anima Anandkumar, computer scientist
- José E. Andrade, civil and mechanical engineer
- Harry Atwater, physicist and materials scientist, Otis Booth Leadership Chair of the Division of Engineering and Applied Science; pioneer in photovoltaics and solar energy
- Paul M. Bellan, applied physicist
- Kaushik Bhattacharya, mechanician and material scientist
- Katie Bouman, engineer and computer scientist
- John F. Brady, chemical engineer
- Oscar Bruno, applied and computational mathematician
- Venkat Chandrasekaran, computer and mathematical scientist
- John Dabiri, aerospace and mechanical engineer
- Chiara Daraio, materials scientist and acoustical engineer
- Michelle Effros, electrical engineer
- Azita Emami, electrical and medical engineer
- Katherine Faber, materials scientist, faculty; originator of the Faber-Evans model for crack deflection; fellow of the American Academy of Arts and Sciences
- Richard Flagan, atmospheric scientist
- Brent Fultz, materials scientist
- Wei Gao, biomedical engineer
- Morteza Gharib, engineer and fluid dynamicist
- Julia R. Greer, materials scientist
- Ali Hajimiri, electrical and biomedical engineer
- Babak Hassibi, electrical engineer, computer scientist, and applied mathematician
- Thomas Hou, applied and computational mathematician
- Nadia Lapusta, mechanical engineer
- Steven H. Low, computing and mathematical scientist
- Urmila Mahadev, theoretical computer scientist, quantum computing and quantum cryptography
- Matilde Marcolli, computing and mathematical scientist
- Richard M. Murray, bioengineer and roboticist
- Nga Lee (Sally) Ng, MS 2004, PhD 2007, atmospheric chemist
- Houman Owhadi, applied and computational mathematician
- Lior Pachter, computational biologist
- Oskar Painter, applied physicist
- Pietro Perona, computer scientist
- Rob B. Phillips, biophysicist
- Niles Pierce, bioengineer
- Guruswami Ravichandran, aerospace and mechanical engineer
- Ares J. Rosakis, aeronautics and mechanical engineer
- Michael Roukes, experimental physicist
- Axel Scherer, electrical engineer and applied physicist
- Peter Schröder, computer scientist
- Leonard Schulman, computer scientist
- Keith Schwab, applied physicist
- Andrew M. Stuart, applied and computational mathematician
- Yu-Chong Tai, Anna L. Rosen Professor of Electrical Engineering and Medical Engineering. Expert in microelectromechanical systems and elected member of National Academy of Engineering for "contributions to microelectromechanical system technologies and parylene-based biomedical microdevices"
- Sandra Troian, applied physicist
- Joel Tropp, applied and computational mathematician
- Chris Umans, computer scientist
- Kerry Vahala, BS 1980, MS 1981, PhD 1985, applied physicist
- P. P. Vaidyanathan, electrical engineer
- Lihong V. Wang, medical and electrical engineer
- Michael M. Watkins, aerospace and geophysicsist, 9th director of NASA's Jet Propulsion Laboratory
- Adam Wierman, computer scientist
- Amnon Yariv, applied physicsist and electrical engineer, Harvey Prize recipient; National Medal of Science recipient

==== Geological and planetary sciences ====
current faculty research faculty emeritus faculty

Alumnus degrees are depicted in italic type.

- Jean-Philippe Avouac, Earle C. Anthony Professor of Geology and Mechanical and Civil Engineering; Associate Director, Center for Autonomous Systems and Technologies. Elected member of National Academy of Sciences for contributions to seismology and geophysics.
- Konstantin Batygin, planetary Scientist
- Michael E. Brown, planetary scientist, Kavli Prize laureate
- Katherine de Kleer, planetary scientist
- John Eiler, geochemist and geologist,, Robert P. Sharp Professor of Geology and professor of geochemistry; world leading researcher in isotope geochemistry; member of National Academy of Sciences
- Kenneth Farley, noble gas isotope geochemist
- John P. Grotzinger, biogeologist
- Joseph Kirschvink, BS/MS 1975, geologist and geophysicist
- Heather A. Knutson, planetary scientist
- Shrinivas Kulkarni, planetary scientist
- Nadia Lapusta, mechanical engineer and geophysist
- Jonathan Lunine, planetary scientist and physicist
- Dianne Newman, molecular microbiologist, awarded MacArthur Fellowship
- Victoria Orphan, geobiologist, awarded MacArthur Fellowship
- Tapio Schneider, climate scientist and physicist
- Joann Stock, geophysist
- Michael M. Watkins, geophysist, former JPL director
- Paul Wennberg, environmental Scientist, awarded MacArthur Fellowship

==== Humanities and social sciences ====
current faculty emeritus faculty

Alumnus degrees are depicted in italic type.

- R. Michael Alvarez, political scientist
- Warren C. Brown, historian of early medieval Europe
- Jed Buchwald, science historian, awarded MacArthur Fellowship
- Colin F. Camerer, behavioral economist, awarded MacArthur Fellowship
- Jakša Cvitanić, economist
- Frederick Eberhardt, philosopher
- Christopher Hitchcock, philosopher
- Jonathan N. Katz, statistician and social scientist, Kay Sugahara Professor of Social Science and Statistics at Caltech; known for work applying statistics and political theory to various problems in social science; fellow of American Academy of Arts and Sciences
- Diana L. Kormos-Buchwald, science historian

==== Physics, mathematics, and astronomy ====
current faculty research faculty emeritus faculty

Alumnus degrees are depicted in italic type.

- Rana X. Adhikari, experimental physicist
- Katie Bouman, engineer and computer scientist
- Fernando Brandão, physicist and computer scientist
- Xie Chen, theoretical physicist
- David Conlon, mathematician
- Katherine de Kleer, planetary scientist
- Vesselin Dimitrov, mathematician
- Kareem El-Badry, astronomer and astrophysicist
- Matthias Flach, mathematician
- Sergei Gukov, mathematics and theoretical physics
- Fiona A. Harrison, astrophysicist
- Lynne Hillenbrand, astronomer
- Anton Kapustin, theoretical physicist
- Mansi Kasliwal, astronomer
- Alexei Kitaev, theoretical physicist, Breakthrough Prize laureate; awarded MacArthur Fellowship
- Shrinivas Kulkarni, astronomer, Alan T. Waterman Award winner; Dan David Prize winner; Shaw Prize laureate
- Kenneth G. Libbrecht, BS 1980, physicist
- Nikolai Georgievich Makarov, mathematician
- Elena Mantovan, mathematician
- Matilde Marcolli, mathematical physicist.
- Hirosi Ooguri, theoretical physicist
- Oskar Painter, PhD 2001, experimental physicist
- Rob B. Phillips, biophysicist
- H. David Politzer, Nobel laureate in physics (2004) "for the discovery of asymptotic freedom in the theory of the strong interaction"
- John Preskill, theoretical physicist
- Thomas Felix Rosenbaum, condensed matter physicist, 9th Caltech president
- Michael Roukes, experimental physicist, nanoscientist
- Axel Scherer, Nanoscience
- Antoine Song, mathematician
- Maria Spiropulu, particle physicist
- Charles C. Steidel, astronomer
- Yunqing Tang, mathematician
- Saul Teukolsky, astrophysicist
- Mark B. Wise, theoretical physicist
- Nai-Chang Yeh, condensed matter physicist
- Kathryn Zurek, theoretical physicist

=== Former faculty ===
Persons who had left the faculty through death, retirement, termination, or by accepting an offer somewhere else. Former members of the faculty are listed by divisions. Alumnus degrees are depicted in italic type.

==== Biology and biological engineering ====
current faculty emeritus faculty

Alumnus degrees are depicted in italic type.

- John Abelson, molecular biologist, emeritus
- Giuseppe Attardi (1923–2008), molecular biologist
- David Baltimore (1938–2025), virologist; Nobel laureate in physiology or medicine (1975) "for their discoveries concerning the interaction between tumour viruses and the genetic material of the cell"; President of Caltech (1997–2006); National Medal of Science recipient; 2021 Lasker Award recipient
- George Wells Beadle (1903–1989), geneticist; Nobel laureate in physiology or medicine (1958) "for their discovery that genes act by regulating definite chemical events"; President of the University of Chicago (1961–1968); Lasker Award winner
- Seymour Benzer (1921–2007), geneticist, Crafoord Prize Laureate in Biosciences (1993); Harvey Prize recipient; Albany Medical Center Prize winner; Lasker Award winner; Gruber Prize in Neuroscience winner; Wolf Prize winner; National Medal of Science recipient
- Eric H. Davidson (1937–2015), developmental biologist
- Norman Davidson (1916–2002), biologist, National Medal of Science recipient
- Max Delbrück (1906–1981), biophysicist and pioneering molecular biologist, Nobel laureate in physiology or medicine (1969) "for their discoveries concerning the replication mechanism and the genetic structure of viruses"
- Raymond J. Deshaies, biochemist and cell biologist, former faculty was at Caltech from 1994 to 2017; at Amgen since 2017
- Theodosius Dobzhansky (1900–1975), geneticist and evolutionary biologist, former faculty at Caltech from 1930 to 1940
- William J. Dreyer (1928–2004), molecular immunologist
- Renato Dulbecco (1914–2012), virologist; Nobel laureate in physiology or medicine (1975) "for their discoveries concerning the interaction between tumour viruses and the genetic material of the cell"; Lasker Award winner
- Robert Stuart Edgar (1930–2016), geneticist, former faculty at Caltech from 1957 to 1970
- Sterling Howard Emerson (1900–1988), geneticist
- Scott D. Emr, cell biologist, former faculty at Caltech from 1983 to 1991
- Scott E. Fraser, biophysicist, former faculty at Caltech from 1990 to 2012
- Arthur Galston (1920–2008), plant physiologist and bioethicist., former faculty at Caltech from 1951 to 1955
- Arie Jan Haagen-Smit (1900–1977), expert in plant derived chemicals, National Medal of Science recipient; winner of Tyler Prize for Environmental Achievement
- Leroy Hood, BS 1960, PhD 1968, genomics and proteomics, was at Caltech from 1970 to 1992
- John Hopfield, former faculty at Caltech from 1980 to 1997; Albert Einstein World Award of Science winner; awarded MacArthur Fellowship; Nobel laureate in physics (2024) for "foundational discoveries and inventions that enable machine learning with artificial neural networks"
- A. James Hudspeth (1945–2025), former faculty at Caltech from 1975 to 1983; Kavli Prize laureate
- Christof Koch, cognitive scientist, neurophysiologist and computational neuroscientist, former faculty at Caltech from 1986 to 2013
- Masakazu Konishi (1933–2020), neurobiologist, Gruber Prize in Neuroscience winner
- Tom Maniatis, molecular and cellular biology, former faculty at Caltech from to 1980
- Thomas Hunt Morgan (1866–1945), evolutionary biologist, geneticist, and embryologist, Nobel laureate in physiology or medicine (1933) "for his discoveries concerning the role played by the chromosome in heredity"
- Wheeler J. North (1922–2002), marine scientist
- James Olds (1922–1976), neuroscientist
- Ray David Owen (1915–2014), biologist
- Erin M. Schuman, neurobiologist, former faculty at Caltech from 1993 to 2009
- Melvin I. Simon, molecular biologist, emeritus, molecular geneticist, and microbiologist, former faculty; Anne P. and Benjamin F. Biaggini Professor of Biological Sciences; pioneering geneticist; member of National Academy of Sciences
- Robert L. Sinsheimer (1920–2017), biophysicist and molecular biologist, former faculty at Caltech from 1957 to 1977; distinguished biophysicist and genetic researcher involved in human genome sequencing effort, phage virus genetics; member of National Academy of Sciences, National Academy of Medicine, and American Academy of Arts and Sciences; recipient of California Scientist of the Year Award
- Roger W. Sperry (1913–1994), neuroscientist, Nobel laureate in physiology or medicine (1981) "for his discoveries concerning the functional specialization of the cerebral hemispheres"; Lasker Award winner; Wolf Prize winner; National Medal of Science recipient
- Alfred Sturtevant (1891–1970), geneticist, former faculty; National Medal of Science recipient
- Kenneth V. Thimann (1904–1997), plant physiologist and microbiologist, former faculty at Caltech from 1930 to 1935
- Jerome Vinograd (1913–1976), biochemist
- Frits Warmolt Went (1903–1990), biologist, former faculty at Caltech from 1933 to 1958
- William Barry Wood III (1938–2024), molecular and developmental biologist, former faculty

==== Chemistry and chemical engineering ====
current faculty emeritus faculty

Alumnus degrees are depicted in italic type.

- Fred C. Anson (1933–2024), BS 1964, electrochemist
- Jay Bailey (1944–2001), biochemical engineerer, former faculty
- John D. Baldeschwieler, chemist, emeritus, National Medal of Science recipient
- Jacqueline Barton, bioinorganic chemist, emerita, MacArthur Fellow (1991), and winner of National Medal of Science (2011); Alan T. Waterman Award winner
- Jesse L. Beauchamp, chemist, emeritus
- John E. Bercaw, chemist, emeritus
- Robert G. Bergman, chemist, former faculty at Caltech from 1967 to 1977; Wolf Prize winner
- Erick M. Carreira, chemist, former faculty at Caltech from 1992 to 1998
- Sunney Chan (1936–2025), biophysical chemist
- Mark E. Davis, chemical engineer, emeritus, Alan T. Waterman Award winner
- Peter Dervan, chemist, emeritus, Harvey Prize recipient; National Medal of Science recipient
- Richard E. Dickerson (1931–2025), biochemist, former faculty at Caltech from 1963 to 1980
- David A. Evans (1941–2022), PhD 1967, synthetic chemist, former faculty at Caltech from 1974 to 1983
- Sheldon K. Friedlander (1927–2007), former faculty at Caltech from 1964 to 1978; renowned researcher in aerosol science and technology; later a professor of chemical engineering at UCLA; member of National Academy of Engineering
- Robert H. Grubbs (1942–2021), chemist, Nobel laureate in chemistry (2005) "for the development of the metathesis method in organic synthesis"
- George S. Hammond (1921–2005), theoretical chemist, former faculty at Caltech from 1958 to 1972
- Barbara Imperiali, biochemist, former faculty at Caltech from 1989 to 1999; professor of Chemistry and professor of Biology at Massachusetts Institute of Technology; member of National Academy of Sciences and fellow of American Academy of Arts and Sciences
- Robert E. Ireland (1929–2012), organic chemist, former faculty at Caltech from 1965 to 1985
- John Gamble Kirkwood (1907–1959), former faculty at Caltech from 1947 to 1952
- Aron Kuppermann (1926–2011), physical chemist
- L. Gary Leal, chemical engineer, former faculty at Caltech from 1970 to 1989
- Howard J. Lucas (1885–1963), former faculty; professor of organic chemistry; member of National Academy of Sciences; namesake of Lucas' reagent
- David MacMillan, former faculty at Caltech from 2000 to 2006; 2021 Nobel laureate in chemistry "for the development of asymmetric organocatalysis"
- Manfred Morari, chemical engineer, former faculty at Caltech from 1983 to 1991
- Carl Niemann (1908–1964), biochemist
- Arthur A. Noyes (1866–1936), chemist
- John D. Roberts (1918–2016), physical chemist, one of the pioneers of NMR as a tool to study organic compounds, winner of the National Medal of Science (1990) and the Priestley Medal (1987)
- John H. Seinfeld, chemical engineer, emeritus, winner of Tyler Prize for Environmental Achievement
- W. Henry Weinberg, former faculty; member of National Academy of Engineering; co-founder of several startup companies
- Ahmed H. Zewail (1946–2016), Nobel laureate in chemistry (1999) "for his studies of the transition states of chemical reactions using femtosecond spectroscopy"; King Faisal International Prize winner; Albert Einstein World Award of Science winner; Wolf Prize winner

==== Engineering and applied science ====
current faculty research faculty emeritus faculty

Alumnus degrees are depicted in italic type.

- Erik Antonsson, mechanical engineer, former faculty at Caltech from 1984 through 2009, former chief technologist at NASA Jet Propulsion Laboratory, and former Director of Research and Corporate Director of Technology at Northrop Grumman; elected member of National Academy of Engineering for leadership in the development of aerospace/defense systems, formal methods of engineering design, and active learning in engineering education
- Robert D. Braun, aerospace scientist, was at Caltech from 2010 to 2012
- William B. Bridges (1934–2024), electrical engineer and applied physicist
- Randal Bryant, computer scientist, former faculty at Caltech from 1981 to 1984
- Emmanuel Candès, applied math, former faculty at Caltech from 2000 to 2009; Alan T. Waterman Award winner
- Jean-Lou Chameau, civil engineer , former faculty at Caltech from 2006 to 2013 and President Emeritus
- K. Mani Chandy, computer scientist, emeritus
- John Doyle, electrical engineer, emeritus
- Pol Duwez (1907–1984),materials scientist
- James P. Eisenstein, applied physicist, emeritus
- Thomas Eugene Everhart, electrical engineer and applied physicist, former faculty and President Emeritus
- Roy W. Gould (1927–2022), electrical engineer and physicist who specialized in plasma physics
- Thomas H. Heaton, seismologist, emeritus
- Janet Hering, hydrologist, former faculty at Caltech from 1996 to 2006
- Michael R. Hoffmann, environmental engineer, emeritus
- Hans G. Hornung, aerospace scientist, emeritus
- Jim Kajiya, computer graphics engineer, former faculty at Caltech from 1979 to 1994
- Herbert Keller (1925–2008), applied mathematician
- Wolfgang Knauss, engineer, emeritus
- Lester Lees (1920-1986), aerospace scientist, former faculty; Professor of Aeronautics, known for pioneering contributions in hypersonic aerodynamics and environmental quality science, notably in boundary layers and heat transfer, flow-over blunt bodies, and the development of reentry vehicles; member of National Academy of Engineering and fellow of American Academy of Arts and Sciences
- Mary Lidstrom, chemical engineer, former faculty at Caltech from to 1995; Jungers Professor of Microbiology and Chemical Engineering, University of Washington; Howard Hughes Medical Investigator; member of National Academy of Sciences
- Hans W. Liepmann (1914–2009), fluid dynamicist and aerospace scientist, National Medal of Technology and Innovation recipient; National Medal of Science recipient
- Jerrold E. Marsden (1942–2010), engineer and control and dynamical systems scientist
- James W. Mayer (1930–2013), applied physicist, former faculty at Caltech from 1967 to 1980
- Jack McKee (1914–1979), environmental engineer; Professor of Environmental Engineering; leading researcher in fields of water quality and waste treatment, including water quality criteria, sewage disinfection, membrane filtration and analysis, and wastewater disposal and reclamation; member of National Academy of Engineering
- Carver Mead, BS 1956, MS 1957, PhD 1960, engineering and applied scientist, emeritus
- James J. Morgan (1932–2020), environmental engineer, former faculty; engineer; Marvin Goldberger Professor of Environmental Engineering Science; world leader in chemistry of natural water systems; acid rain; wastewater and drinking water treatment; coagulation processes in aqueous systems; rates of oxidation processes in water; adsorption and surface chemistry; chemistry of water purification; transport of metals and other substances in water; and water quality modeling; member of National Academy of Engineering
- Michael Ortiz (mathematician), applied mathematician, emeritus
- Stanford S. Penner (1921–2016), rocket scientist and engineer, former faculty at Caltech from 1950 to 1964
- Milton S. Plesset (1908–1991), applied physicist, former faculty at Caltech from 1951 to 1978
- Demetri Psaltis, electrical engineer, former faculty at Caltech from 1980 to 2007
- David Rutledge (engineer), engineer, emeritus
- Stephen Quake, applied physicist, former faculty at Caltech from 1996 to 2005
- Fredric Raichlen (1932–2014), civil and mechanical engineer, emeritus; Professor Emeritus of Mechanical and Civil Engineering; made major contributions to hydraulics and coastal engineering, particularly in the areas of tsunamis, ship dynamics, and breaking waves; member of National Academy of Engineering
- Philip Saffman (1931–2008), applied mathematician
- Ronald F. Scott (1929–2005), civil and geotechnical engineer; Dotty and Dick Hayman Professor of Civil Engineering, Emeritus; made major contributions to mechanics of deformation and yielding in soils, soil behavior in earthquakes, the physical chemistry and mechanics of ocean-bottom-soil, and freezing and thawing processes in soils; consultant to several NASA missions; member of National Academy of Engineering
- Royal Wasson Sorensen (1882–1965), electrical engineeri
- Theodore von Kármán (1881–1963), mathematician, aerospace engineer, and physicist who worked in aeronautics and astronautics, National Medal of Science recipient
- Gerald B. Whitham (1927–2014), applied mathematician

==== Geological and planetary sciences ====
current faculty research faculty emeritus faculty

Alumnus degrees are depicted in italic type.

- Harrison Brown (1917–1986), nuclear chemist and geochemist, former faculty at Caltech from 1951 to 1977
- Bethany Ehlmann, planetary scientist, was at Caltech from 2011 to 2025
- Samuel Epstein (1919–2001), geochemist
- Beno Gutenberg (1889–1960), seismologist
- Don Helmberger (1938–2020), pioneering seismologist; member of National Academy of Sciences
- Thomas H. Heaton, seismologist, emeritus
- Andrew Ingersoll, planetary scientist, emeritus
- Barclay Kamb (1931–2011), BS 1952, PhD 1956, geologist
- Hiroo Kanamori, seismologist, emeritus, Kyoto Prize laureate
- Heinz A. Lowenstam (1912–1993), paleoecologist
- Bruce C. Murray (1931–2013), planetary scientist
- Clair Cameron Patterson (1922–1995), geochemist, determined the age of the Earth; exposed lead pollution; winner of Tyler Prize for Environmental Achievement
- Frank Press (1924–2020), geophysicist, former faculty at Caltech from 1957 to 1965; Japan Prize laureate
- Robert P. Sharp (1911–2004), BS 1934, MS 1935, geomorphologist
- Kerry Sieh, geologist and seismologist, former faculty at Caltech from 1986 to 2009
- David J. Stevenson, planetary scientist, emeritus
- Chester Stock (1892–1950), paleontologist
- Edward M. Stolper, geologist, petrologist, and planetologist, emeritus
- Gerald J. Wasserburg (1927–2016), geologist, Crafoord Prize laureate in geochemistry (1986)
- Brian P. Wernicke, geologist, emeritus
- James Westphal (1930–2004), planetary scientist, awarded MacArthur Fellowship
- Peter John Wyllie, petrologist, emeritus
- Yuk L. Yung (1946–2026), planetary scientist

==== Humanities and social sciences ====
current faculty emeritus faculty

Alumnus degrees are depicted in italic type.

- Robert Bates, political scientist, former faculty at Caltech from 1969 to 1985
- John F. Benton (1931–1988), medieval historian; awarded MacArthur Fellowship
- Bruce E. Cain, political scientist, former faculty at Caltech from 1976 to 1989
- Nicholas Dirks, South Asian historian, former faculty at Caltech from 1981 to 1987
- Jean Ensminger, social scientist, emerita
- John Ferejohn, political scientist, former faculty at Caltech from 1972 to 1983; Samuel Tilden Professor of Law at New York University (formerly a professor at Stanford University and Hoover Institution fellow); member of National Academy of Sciences and fellow of American Academy of Arts and Sciences
- Morris P. Fiorina, political scientist, former faculty at Caltech from 1972 to 1998
- Robert Huttenback (1928–2012), historian, former faculty at Caltech from 1960 to 1977
- Matthew O. Jackson, economist, former faculty at Caltech from 1997 to 2002
- Abraham Kaplan (1918–1993), philosopher, former faculty at Caltech
- Daniel Kevles, science historian, emeritus
- J. Morgan Kousser, historian and social scientist, emeritus
- Jenijoy La Belle (1943–2025), english professor, emerita, won sex discrimination case against administration
- John O. Ledyard, Allen and Lenabelle Davis Professor of Economics and Social Sciences, Emeritus at Caltech; contributed to theory and application of mechanism design in economics and social science; fellow of American Academy of Arts and Sciences
- Preston McAfee, economist, former faculty at Caltech from 2003 to 2009
- Jerome McGann, literature historian, former faculty at Caltech from 1980 to 1986
- Richard McKelvey (1944–2002), political scientist
- William B. Munro (1875–1957), historian and political scientist
- Peter Ordeshook, political scientist, emeritus
- Scott E. Page, social scientist, former faculty at Caltech from 1993 to 1997
- Thomas Palfrey, PhD 1981, economist and political scientist, emeritus
- Charles Plott, economist and political scientist, emeritus
- Robert A. Rosenstone, historian, emeritus
- Thayer Scudder, social anthropologist, emeritus

==== Physics, mathematics, and astronomy ====
current faculty research faculty emeritus faculty

Alumnus degrees are depicted in italic type.

- Tom M. Apostol (1923–2016), mathematician
- Michael Aschbacher, BS 1966, mathematician, emeritus
- Robert Bacher (1905–2004), nuclear physicist who worked on the Manhattan Project
- John N. Bahcall (1934–2005), former faculty from 1962 to 1968 (may only be a research fellow, if true, please delete), astrophysicist
- Barry Barish, physicist, emeritus, co-recipient of 2017 Nobel Prize in Physics "for decisive contributions to the LIGO detector and the observation of gravitational waves"; recipient of National Medal of Science
- Harry Bateman (1882–1946), mathematician
- Eric Temple Bell (1883–1960), mathematician and science fiction author
- Roger Blandford, former faculty; Crafoord laureate and recipient of Shaw Prize
- Felix Boehm (1924–2021), former faculty; leading nuclear physicist who made major contributions to study of neutrinos; member of National Academy of Sciences
- Harold Brown (1927–2019), physicist, president of Caltech (1969–77), U.S. Secretary of Defense (1977–81)
- Danny Calegari, former faculty from 2003 to 2010, mathematician
- John Carlstrom, former faculty; astrophysicist, Gruber Prize in Cosmology winner; awarded MacArthur Fellowship
- Robert F. Christy (1916–2012), theoretical physicist and later astrophysicist
- Judith Gamora Cohen, astronomer, emeritus
- Marshall H. Cohen, former faculty; Professor of Astronomy, Emeritus at Caltech; member of National Academy of Sciences
- Ronald Drever (1931–2017), experimental physicist, Shaw Prize laureate; Kavli Prize laureate; Breakthrough Prize laureate; Gruber Prize in Cosmology winner; Harvey Prize recipient
- Lee Alvin DuBridge (1901–1994), physicist
- James P. Eisenstein, physicist, emeritus, Wolf Prize winner
- Richard Ellis; former faculty
- Paul Sophus Epstein (1883–1966), mathematical physicist, former faculty
- Arthur Erdélyi (1908–1977), mathematician, former faculty
- Glennys Farrar, physicist, former faculty at Caltech, officially from 1974 to 1977, but was "reclassified" as a Senior Research Scientist to avoid giving her tenure by the almost all male department at that time, which is also during the same time period in which no woman held a tenured position anywhere on campus prior to 1979
- Richard Feynman (1918–1988), Nobel laureate in physics (1965) "for their fundamental work in quantum electrodynamics, with deep-ploughing consequences for the physics of elementary particles"; National Medal of Science recipient
- Steven Frautschi, theoretical physicist, emeritus
- David Gabai, mathematician, at Caltech from 1986 to 2001, former faculty
- Murray Gell-Mann (1929–2019), Nobel laureate in physics (1969) "for his contributions and discoveries concerning the classification of elementary particles and their interactions"; co-founder of Santa Fe Institute; recipient of Franklin Medal
- Marvin Leonard Goldberger (1922–2014), former faculty and President Emeritus
- Peter Goldreich, astrophysicist, emeritus
- David Goodstein (1939–2024), director of The Mechanical Universe
- Jesse L. Greenstein (1909–2002), astronomer.
- George Ellery Hale (1868–1938), astronomer
- Marshall Hall (1910–1990), mathematician, former faculty
- Fiona A. Harrison, astrophysicist
- William Vermillion Houston (1900–1968), physicist, former faculty
- Marc Kamionkowski, at Caltech from 2006 to 2011, former faculty
- Samuel Karlin (1924–2007), former faculty
- Nets Katz, mathematician, at Caltech from 2013 to 2023
- Alexander Kechris, mathematician, emeritus
- H. Jeff Kimble (1949–2024), physicist
- Andrew E. Lange (1957–2010), astrophysicist, Dan David Prize winner; Balzan Prize recipient
- Robert B. Leighton (1919–1997), experimental physicist
- Wilhelmus Luxemburg (1929–2018), mathematician
- Vladimir Markovic, mathematician, was at Caltech from 2013 to 2020
- Robert A. Millikan (1868–1953), Nobel laureate in physics (1923) "for his work on the elementary charge of electricity and on the photoelectric effect"
- Rudolf Mössbauer (1929–2011), Nobel laureate in physics (1961) "for his researches concerning the resonance absorption of gamma radiation and his discovery in this connection of the effect which bears his name"; former faculty
- Guido Münch (1921–2020), astronomer and astrophysicist., former faculty
- Robert Oppenheimer (1904–1967), director of the Manhattan Project
- Rahul Pandharipande, former faculty
- Thomas Prince, physics, emeritus
- Eric M. Rains, mathematician, emeritus
- Anthony C. Readhead, astronomer, emeritus, Barbara and Stanley Rawn Jr. Professor of Astronomy; member of National Academy of Sciences; fellow of American Academy of Arts and Sciences
- Herbert John Ryser (1923–1985), mathematician
- Anneila Sargent, astronomer, emerita
- Wallace L. W. Sargent (1935–2012), astronomer
- Maarten Schmidt (1929–2022), astronomer, Kavli Prize laureate
- John H. Schwarz, theoretical physicist, emeritus, Breakthrough Prize laureate; awarded MacArthur Fellowship
- Frank Sciulli, former faculty; Pupin Professor of Physics, Emeritus at Columbia University; member of National Academy of Sciences
- Nick Scoville, astronomer, emeritus
- Barry Simon, Mathematics and Theoretical Physics, Emeritus
- Frank Spitzer (1926–1992), mathematician, former faculty
- Edward C. Stone (1936–2024), space physicist, National Medal of Science recipient, Shaw Prize laureate
- Kip Thorne, BS 1962, astrophysicist, emeritus, 2017 Nobel Prize in Physics with Rainer Weiss and Barry C. Barish
- Richard C. Tolman (1881–1948), mathematical physicist and physical chemist
- Tom Tombrello (1936–2014), physicist
- Rochus Eugen Vogt, physicist, emeritus
- R. M. Wilson, mathematician, emeritus
- Peter J. Young (1954–1981), PhD 1978, astrophysicist
- Fritz Zwicky (1898–1974), produced the first evidence of dark matter

== See also ==
- List of Nobel laureates affiliated with California Institute of Technology
