= Richard Wilson (physicist) =

- Born: 29 April 1926; London, England, U.K.
- Died: 19 May 2018 (aged 92)
- Education: Oxford University
- Known for: Risk Analysis
- Spouse: Andree Desiree Dumond (1928–2016)
- Awards: IUSSR, Chernobyl Medal, Andrei Sakharov Prize, Dixy Lee Ray Award
- Scientific career
- Fields: Physics
- Workplaces: Harvard University
- Doctoral advisor: CH Collie

Richard Wilson (29 April 1926 – 19 May 2018) was a British-American physicist. His original fields were nuclear and elementary particle physics but branched out into applications of physics in other disciplines. Most of his career he had been a physics professor at Harvard University.

== Biography ==
Wilson was born in Putney, London, on 29 April 1926 to Dorothy Jennett Kingston, a teacher of French, and Percy Wilson a civil servant in the Board of Education, who had been a Naval officer in World War I. He went to Colet Court school in Hammersmith, a preparatory School for St Paul's School, and then to St Paul's School from 1939 to 1943. He earned a BA in 1946 at Christ Church Oxford, and an MA and D Phil in 1949. He was awarded a Research Lectureship at Christ Church from 1949 to 1954.

On leave from this lectureship he visited America on a Guggenheim fellowship in 1950 – 1952, firstly at Rochester New York, then at Stanford University, California. While at Stanford he married Andree Desiree Dumond, daughter of the physicist Jesse Dumond of California Institute of Technology. He returned to Oxford in 1952 for 3 years before taking up a position as assistant professor at Harvard University, where he then served as Mallinckrodt Professor of Physics.

He visited the USSR in 1958. After the dissolution of the USSR helped to found the International Sakharov University in Minsk, Belarus in 1991. From 1975 he became a frequent visitor to Arab countries and lectured in 44 different countries altogether. In 1988 he became a member of the Science Advisory Board of the Atlantic Legal Foundation, a public interest law foundation.

He and his wife had 6 children. He died in May 2018 at the age of 92.

== Research ==
Wilson's first research was on the properties of the nucleon. He started by using radioactive sources and then using first the cyclotron at AERE, Harwell, UK then the cyclotron at Harvard University, USA. This work is described in many papers and in the book "The Nucleon-Nucleon Interaction" (Wiley-Interscience) in 1963.

At Harvard he became an enthusiastic supporter of the Cambridge Electron Accelerator (CEA) and was Chairman of the Management committee from 1961 to 1968. He became known for his work on nucleon form factors, an interest which continues.

He was a Trustee of the Universities Research Association from 1987 to 1993, and studied the inelastic form factors. Wilson was an early proponent of electron-positron colliding beams. and worked thereon in Frascati, CEA and Cornell University.

In 1991 he realised that the general public was no longer automatically supporting physicists and began a career explaining the positive aspects of radiation use, as well as its risks and dangers. In this he used the "hands on" style of an experimental physicist and soon became an expert on nuclear accidents: Three Mile Island, Chernobyl & Fukushima. He is particularly known for his visits to Chernobyl, being the first American scientist to go to the plant, and measure radioactivity levels thereby exposing himself to the dangers.

He expanded his interests to other hazards, and thereby helped to found the field of risk analysis. His paper "The Daily Risks of Life" was reprinted in Reader's Digest and the Farmers' Almanac. In the same year his testimony about the risks of benzene was quoted by the US Supreme Court. In this work he realised that while it is interesting what scientists say in their conferences; the US public is more concerned about of what Congress enacts in response but most importantly what the courts said last week. This realisation has led to an activity on emphasising, to the courts the fundamental thinking of a physicist. This includes the role of expert witnesses in court cases.

== Publications ==
Wilson is the author of 935 published articles and papers in particle physics and (nuclear) risk assessment. His writings have appeared in various scientific journals, including Nature and Science. They are listed on his webpage: http://physics.harvard.edu/~wilson/publications/published_papers.html from which site many may be downloaded.

He also is the author of eight books:

- Nucleon-nucleon Interactions, Wiley Interscience.
- Energy, Ecology and the Environment, with W. Jones, Academic Press.
- Health Effects of Fossil Fuel Burning, Harvard University Press.
- Risk-Benefit Analysis, with Edmond AC Crouch, Harvard University Press.
- Particles in our Air, Harvard University Press (1996) edited with J Spengler.
- Risk-Benefit Analysis 2nd Edition, Harvard University Press, (2001) with Edmund AC Crouch.
- A Brief History of the Harvard Cyclotrons, Harvard University Press, (2004).
- Physics is Fun: Memoirs of a Life in Physics. Mira Digital Publishing.

== Societies ==
Wilson was elected to the American Academy of Arts and Sciences at the age of 34. He is also a member of the New York Academy of Arts and Sciences, American Physical Society, American Nuclear Society, Society of Toxicology and Society for Risk Analysis.
