= Julia A. Kornfield =

American chemist

Julia Ann Kornfield
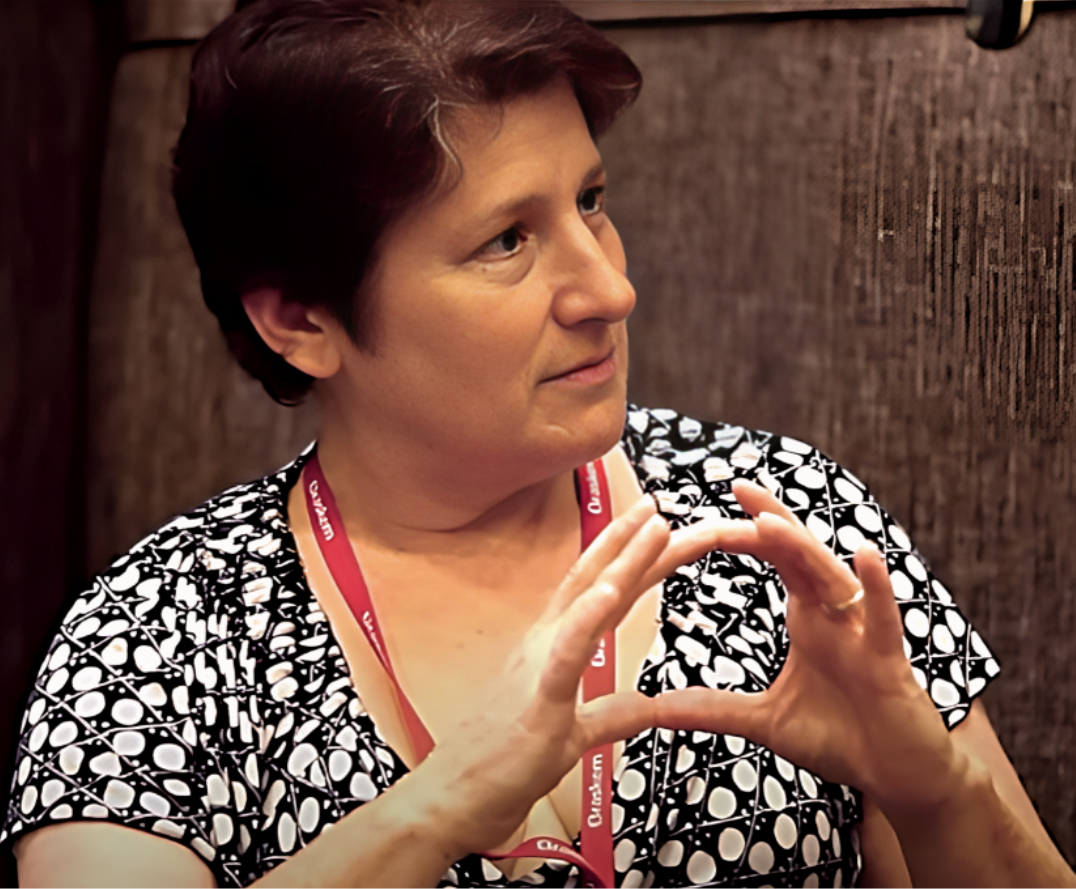
- Julia Kornfield at the Braskem Technology & Innovation Conference in 2017
- Born: Oakland, California, US
- Education: California Institute of Technology (BS, MS); Stanford University (PhD)
- Scientific career
- Fields: Chemical Engineering; Polymer Chemistry
- Workplaces: California Institute of Technology; Max Planck Institute for Polymer Research
- Thesis: Measurement and theory of the dynamics of polydisperse polymer melts (1989)
- Doctoral advisor: Gerald Fuller
- Other academic advisors: Hans Spiess (postdoctoral advisor)
- Website: kornfield.caltech.edu

Julia A. Kornfield is a Professor of Chemical Engineering at the California Institute of Technology. A world expert in polymer science, Kornfield's research encompasses the development of mega-supramolecular systems for fuel additives and intraocular lenses, as well as the influence of flow on polymer chains.

Kornfield was elected a member of the National Academy of Engineering in 2020 for developing megasupramolecules for antimisting fuel additives and light-adjustable intraocular lenses to improve cataract surgery outcomes.

== Early life and education ==
Kornfield was born in Oakland, California and grew up in the San Francisco Bay Area. Her father is a surgeon and her mother was a chef. She studied chemistry at the California Institute of Technology (Caltech) and graduated in 1983. She specialised in chemical engineering for her graduate studies, and earned a master's degree at Caltech before joining Stanford University for her doctoral research with Gerald Fuller. She earned her doctorate at Stanford in 1988. After graduating, Kornfield joined the Max Planck Institute for Polymer Research, where she worked as a NATO postdoctoral scholar with Hans Spiess. Her early research considered the optical properties of polymers in their melt phase. She studied the molecular weight distributions of polymer melts, as well as investigating their nematic order.

== Research and career ==
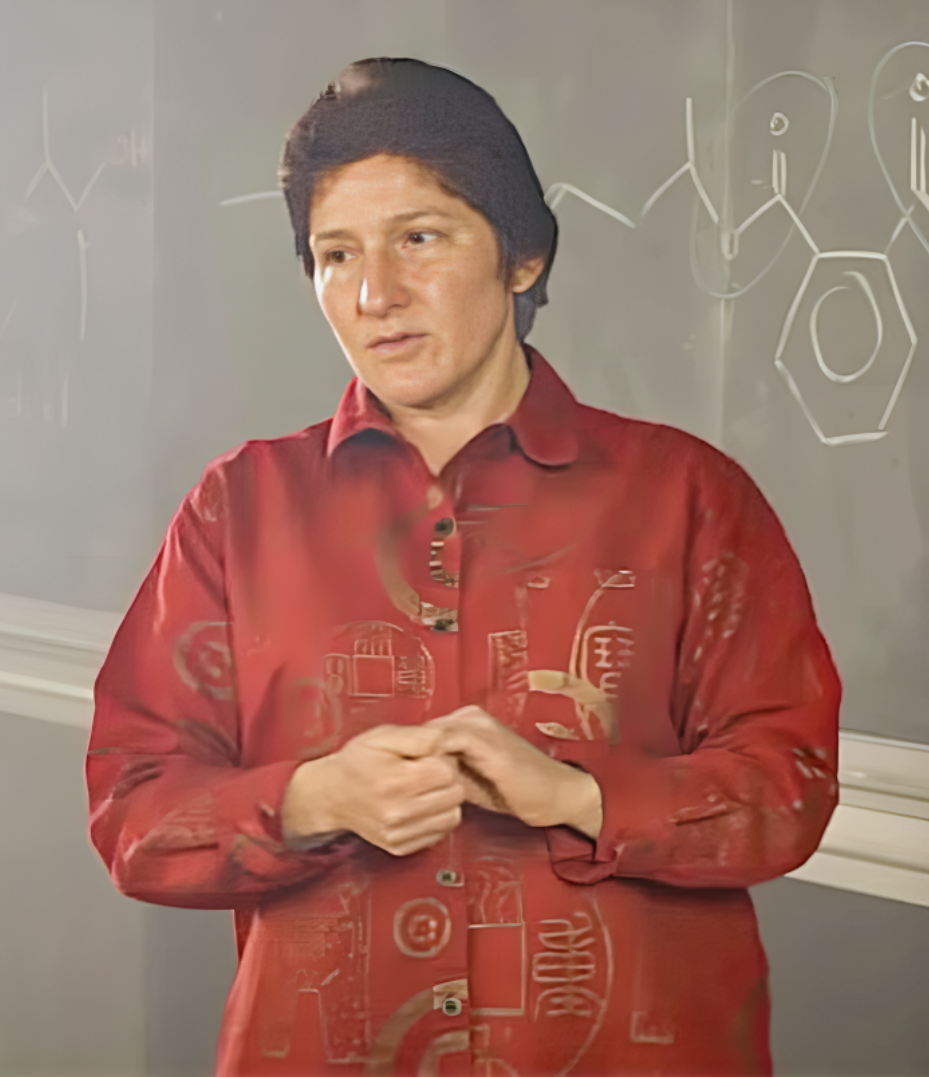
Julia Kornfield lecturing on polyesters in 2017.

After completing her two-year post-doctoral fellowship in Germany, Kornfield was recruited to join the chemical engineering faculty at Caltech in 1990. She is the first woman who earned her bachelor's at Caltech to return as a professor. Five years later, she was promoted to Associate Professor in 1995 and to full Professor in 2001. Kornfield was appointed the Elizabeth W. Gilloon Professor of Chemical Engineering in 2020.

Kornfield studies the macroscopic properties of polymer materials. Her research considers the physics and chemistry of polymers, as well as treatments for eye disease. She built a range of optical methods for rheology, combining molecular level probes with rheology measurements. These investigations included quantitative observations of the dynamics of polymers and the local level; including the molecular level motions that determine their glass transition temperature. Kornfield has considered the orientation of block co-polymers, polymer liquid crystals and how polymer sidechains impact their viscoelasticity. She showed that certain block co-polymers can form structures that contain multiple differently oriented states. Kornfield went on to show that certain topological structures, including rings, wedges and branched chains, demonstrate distinct relaxation responses.

Alongside her research into the material properties of polymers, Kornfield looks to apply her understanding to societal challenges. After the September 11 attacks Kornfield was motivated to design new polymeric systems that can be added to fuels to minimise the risk of explosion. The polymers attach to one another via amine and carboxylic acids groups to form mega-supramolecules, which reduce the burn time, size and temperature of ignited fuel. Kornfield has worked with the United States Army to test the polymer additives in improvised explosives and projectiles.

Kornfield has demonstrated intraocular lenses that contain a silicone polymeric material that can be shaped after being implanted through the use of laser light. She worked with a surgeon at the UCSF Medical Center to transfer the lenses out of the laboratory and into the clinic.

Kornfield is the only woman to win the Society of Rheology Bingham Medal since it began in 1948. She spent 2018 as an academic visitor at the East China University of Science and Technology.

== Awards and honors ==
- 1996 American Physical Society John H. Dillon Medal
- 2000 Elected Fellow of the American Physical Society
- 2007 Elected Fellow of the American Association for the Advancement of Science
- 2017 Society of Rheology Bingham Medal
- 2019 Inducted into the National Academy of Inventors
- 2020 Elected to the National Academy of Engineering

== Selected publications ==
- Kumaraswamy, Guruswamy; Issaian, Ani M.; Kornfield, Julia A. (1999-11-01). "Shear-Enhanced Crystallization in Isotactic Polypropylene. 1. Correspondence between in Situ Rheo-Optics and ex Situ Structure Determination". Macromolecules. 32 (22): 7537–7547. Bibcode:1999MaMol..32.7537K. doi:10.1021/ma990772j. ISSN 0024-9297.
- Xia, Yan; Olsen, Bradley D.; Kornfield, Julia A.; Grubbs, Robert H. (2009-12-30). "Efficient Synthesis of Narrowly Dispersed Brush Copolymers and Study of Their Assemblies: The Importance of Side Chain Arrangement" (PDF). Journal of the American Chemical Society. 131 (51): 18525–18532. Bibcode:2009JAChS.13118525X. doi:10.1021/ja908379q. ISSN 0002-7863. PMID 19947607.
- Seki, Motohiro; Thurman, Derek W.; Oberhauser, James P.; Kornfield, Julia A. (2002-03-01). "Shear-Mediated Crystallization of Isotactic Polypropylene: The Role of Long Chain−Long Chain Overlap". Macromolecules. 35 (7): 2583–2594. Bibcode:2002MaMol..35.2583S. doi:10.1021/ma011359q. ISSN 0024-9297.

Kornfield holds several patents for polymer processing and devices to tackle eye disease.
