= Matthew John Allen =

Chemist at Wayne State University

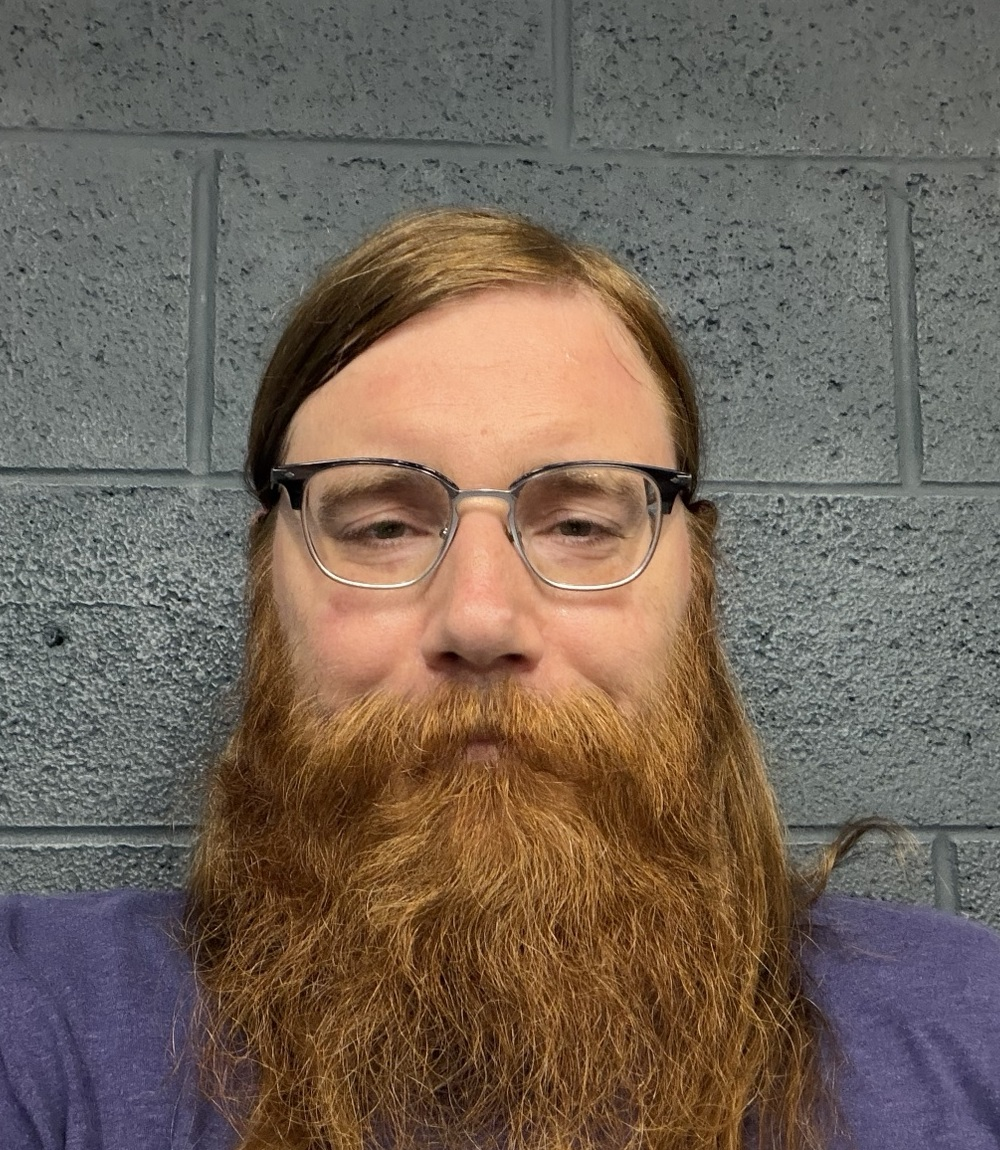
- Allen in 2026
- Education: Purdue University (BS); California Institute of Technology (PhD)
- Awards: Fellow of the American Association for the Advancement of Science (2018); Fellow of the American Chemical Society (2019)
- Scientific career
- Fields: Inorganic chemistry Coordination chemistry
- Workplaces: Wayne State University
- Doctoral advisor: Thomas J. Meade
- Other academic advisors: Laura L. Kiessling; Ronald Raines

Matthew John Allen is an American inorganic chemist, professor and Assistant Vice President for Research and Innovation at Wayne State University. He researches the aqueous coordination chemistry of lanthanides, particularly complexes of divalent europium for magnetic resonance imaging, luminescence, and catalysis. Allen was elected a Fellow of the American Association for the Advancement of Science in 2018 and a Fellow of the American Chemical Society in 2019.

== Education ==
Allen received a Bachelor of Science in chemistry in 1998 from Purdue University. As an undergraduate, he conducted research with Jillian Buriak on the chemical stabilization of porous-silicon surfaces. He earned a doctorate in chemistry from the California Institute of Technology in 2004, with his dissertation, Delivery and Activation of Contrast Agents for Magnetic Resonance Imaging, advised by Thomas J. Meade.

== Career ==
From 2004 to 2007, Allen conducted postdoctoral research with Laura L. Kiessling and Ronald Raines at the University of Wisconsin–Madison. He joined Wayne State University in 2008 and became a professor in 2016. He has served as chair of Wayne State's Department of Chemistry since 2016.

Allen's research group has developed ligand environments that allow the normally oxygen-sensitive europium(II) ion to persist in aqueous solution. An independent review described the group's use of steric protection, donor basicity, ligand-cavity size, and hard–soft acid–base interactions to increase the oxidative stability of aqueous europium(II) complexes. A comprehensive independent review discussed the group's europium(II) cryptates as MRI contrast agents, including their prolonged contrast enhancement following injection into tumors.

In 2023, the National Institute of Biomedical Imaging and Bioengineering featured the group's development of a molecular cage intended to protect an oxygen-sensitive europium(II) probe while it circulated in blood. The institute described the work as a step toward MRI probes that could identify and monitor regions of low oxygen in diseased tissue.

The group has also studied europium(II) luminescence and photoredox chemistry. Researchers developing air-stable molecular europium(II) emitters identified the group's europium(II) azacryptates as prior work that had drawn interest for luminescence, photoredox catalysis, and MRI. A review of lanthanide redox catalysis discussed the Allen group's use of photoexcited europium(II) in visible-light-promoted bond-forming reactions.

== Selected honors ==
- 2018 – Fellow of the American Association for the Advancement of Science
- 2019 – Fellow of the American Chemical Society
