= Joel D. Blum =

American environmental science researcher

Joel D. Blum (born 1960) is a scientist who specializes in isotope geochemistry and environmental geochemistry. He is currently a professor of Earth and Environmental Sciences at the University of Michigan and an elected member of the National Academy of Sciences. Blum has several named professorships including the John D. MacArthur, Arthur F. Thurnau and Gerald J. Keeler Distinguished Professorship. Blum is a past Co-Editor- in-Chief of Chemical Geology and Elementa, and is the current Editor-in-Chief of the American Chemical Society journal Earth and Space Chemistry.

== Biography and education ==
Blum was born in Cleveland, Ohio in 1960. He received his bachelor's degree from Case Western Reserve (B.A. 1981), his masters from University of Alaska, Fairbanks (MSc. 1982), and his doctorate from the California Institute of Technology (PhD 1990).

== Academic career ==
After receiving his PhD from the California Institute of Technology in 1990, Blum began his academic career as an assistant professor of Earth Sciences at Dartmouth College, where he was promoted to Associate and then Full Professor. In 1999, Blum accepted a faculty position at the University of Michigan as the John D. MacArthur Professor. From 2000 to 2006, Blum was the chair of the Geological Sciences Department. In 2010, Blum received an Arthur F. Thurnau professorship for his achievements in undergraduate teaching, and in 2015, Blum was awarded the Jerry F. Keeler distinguished professorship for his excellence in research.

== Research ==
Blum's research group studies geochemical controls on the structure and function of ecosystems, as well as trace elements and isotope geochemistry across the field of Earth and Environmental Sciences. Blum's recent research has focused on understanding the chemistry of mercury in aquatic, terrestrial and atmospheric systems. Blum and his research group have developed methods for utilizing mercury stable isotopes in ecology and environmental geochemistry.

Other areas of scientific inquiry that Blum has studied include the petrogenesis of igneous rocks, mineral weathering and its effect on global climate, arsenic and lead in groundwater and soils, and the effects of acid deposition and atmospheric dust on nutrient cycling in forests. Blum's prolific scientific career and accomplishments are evident in the breadth and notability of his research publications—over 200 research publications and over 12,000 citations in total.

== Honors and awards ==
Blum's scientific research has been recognized with awards from the Geochemical Society (the Clair Patterson Award), the Sloan Foundation, the National Science Foundation, the University of Alaska, and Case Western Reserve. Additionally, Blum is an elected member of the National Academy of Sciences (2020) and a fellow of the American Geophysical Union (2012), the Geochemical Society (2010), the American Association for the Advancement of Science (2010), and the Geological Society of America (2005).

== Notable journal publications ==
- Blum, J.D., Popp, B.N., Drazen, J.C., Choy, C.A. and Johnson, M.W. (2013) Evidence for methylmercury production below the mixed layer in the North Pacific Ocean. Nature Geoscience 6, 879–884.
- Sherman, L.S., Blum, J.D., Franzblau, A. and Basu, N. (2013) New insight into biomarkers of human mercury exposure using naturally occurring mercury stable isotopes. Env. Sci and Tech. 47, 3403–3409.
- Bergquist, B.A. and Blum, J.D. (2007) Mass-dependent and -independent fractionation of Hg isotopes by photo-reduction in aquatic systems. Science. 318, 417–420.
- Blum, J.D., Klaue, A., *Nezat, C.A., Driscoll, C.T., Johnson, C.E., Siccama, T.G. Eagar, C., Fahey, T.J. and Likens, G.E. (2002) Mycorrhizal weathering of apatite as an important Ca source in base-poor forest ecosystems. Nature 417, 729–731.

– Source:
