= Venkat Chandrasekaran =

American applied mathematician

- Education: Rice University, Massachusetts Institute of Technology
- Known for: Optimization, Signal processing, Machine learning
- Awards: Jin-Au Kong Dissertation Prize (2012), Young Researcher Prize in Continuous Optimization (2013)
- Scientific career
- Fields: Applied mathematics
- Workplaces: California Institute of Technology
- Doctoral advisor: Pablo Parrilo and Alan Willsky

Venkat Chandrasekaran is a professor in the Computing and Mathematical Sciences Department at the California Institute of Technology. He is known for work on mathematical optimization and its application to the information sciences.

== Academic biography ==
Chandrasekaran studied at Rice University, where he completed the BA degree in mathematics and the BS degree in electrical and computer engineering in 2005. He then received a PhD degree in electrical engineering and computer science from the Massachusetts Institute of Technology in 2011. He was a postdoctoral researcher at the University of California, Berkeley for one year before joining Caltech as an assistant professor in 2012.

== Research and honors ==
Chandrasekaran's research focuses on mathematical optimization and, specifically, developing an understanding of the power and limitations of convex optimization. His thesis work studied convex optimization in the context of questions related to statistical modeling, and received the Jin-Au Kong Outstanding Doctoral Thesis Prize for the best PhD thesis in electrical engineering at MIT. Additionally, he received the Young Researcher Prize in Continuous Optimization for his work on matrix decomposition.
