= Oskar Painter =

Canadian born experimental physicist (born 1972)

Oskar Painter is a Canadian born (1972) experimental physicist who works on nanoscale optics, nanomechanical devices, and superconducting qubits. He is the John G. Braun Professor of Applied Physics and Professor of Physics at Caltech. Since 2019, he is also Head of Quantum Hardware at Amazon Web Services (AWS).

Painter received his PhD from Caltech in 2001 under the supervision of Prof. Axel Scherer. After graduation, Painter helped found Xponent Photonics along with Pete Sercel and Caltech colleagues Kerry Vahala and Amnon Yariv. Painter joined the Caltech faculty in 2002, as an assistant professor of Applied Physics. In 2012, he became Director at the Max Planck Institute for the Science of Light and was awarded a Humboldt Professorship in 2013. In 2014, he returned to Caltech. Painter has also served as the co-director of the Kavli Nanoscience Institute and co-PI of the Institute of Quantum Information and Matter during his time at Caltech.

Painter's research has covered many topics, including photonic crystals and silicon photonics, to solid-state cavity quantum electrodynamics and quantum optomechanics. More recently, he has shifted his research towards superconducting quantum circuits, with a particular emphasis on hybrid circuit architectures involving the integration of optical and nanomechanical devices.

== Publications ==
- "Oskar Painter's articles on Google Scholar".
- "Oskar Painter's articles on ArXiv".
