= Paul M. Bellan =

Canadian-American plasma physicist

- Born: Winnipeg, Canada
- Education: University of Manitoba; Princeton University
- Known for: spheromak, plasma jets, magnetic reconnection
- Scientific career
- Fields: Plasma Physics
- Workplaces: California Institute of Technology
- Doctoral advisor: Miklos Porkolab

Paul Murray Bellan is a Canadian-American physicist. He is a professor of Applied Physics at Caltech, working in experimental plasma physics, magnetohydrodynamics, and laboratory astrophysics. He is the author of the textbook Fundamentals of Plasma Physics.

== Early life and education ==
Paul Bellan grew up in Winnipeg, Canada. He earned a Bachelor of Science with honors in 1970 from the University of Manitoba. He went on to pursue his graduate studies in plasma physics at Princeton University, where he married fellow physicist Josette Bellan. He earned his Master of Arts in 1972 and his Ph.D. in 1976. His doctoral research, under the guidance of Miklos Porkolab, focused on the generation and behavior of lower hybrid waves generated by periodic antennae.

== Career ==
Prof. Bellan has served as faculty of the department of Applied Physics and Materials Science at Caltech since 1977, initially working closely with physicist Roy W. Gould. He has mentored over 30 graduate students, and has taught an introductory course on plasma physics, based on which he authored the textbook Fundamentals of Plasma Physics.

Bellan’s research focuses on plasma physics through laboratory experiments, analytical models, and numerical simulations. He has contributed to plasma self-organization through Taylor state relaxation, especially in Spheromak formation, pioneering experimental work on Spheromak injection for noninductive Tokamak ramp-up. He has authored two graduate-level books on Spheromaks and Magnetic helicity. He has also contributed to plasma laboratory astrophysics, performing experiments that model astrophysical jets, generation of nanoflares by solar coronal loops, and dusty plasma phenomena in noctilucent clouds and protoplanetary disks.

Bellan was elected a Fellow of the American Physical Society (APS) in 1991, and was awarded the Writing Award from the American Astronomical Society in 2001 for his article on solar prominences.
