= Alejandro Aceves =

American mathematician

- Education: National Autonomous University of Mexico; California Institute of Technology; University of Arizona
- Occupation: Mathematician

Alejandro Aceves is an American mathematician. He is a professor in the department of mathematics at Southern Methodist University.

In 2025, Aceves was named a fellow of the American Association for the Advancement of Science.
