= James F. Pankow =

American environmental engineer (born 1951)

- Born: 1951 (age 74–75)
- Education: State University of New York at Binghamton (B.S., 1973); California Institute of Technology (Ph.D., 1979)
- Known for: Gas-particle partitioning theory of organic aerosols Thermodynamic modeling of urban and global atmospheric particulate matter
- Awards: John Wesley Powell Award (1993); ACS Award for Creative Advances in Environmental Science and Technology (1999); Haagen-Smit Prize (2005); Member of the National Academy of Engineering (2009)

James F. Pankow (born 1951) is an American environmental engineer.

Pankow studied chemistry at the State University of New York at Binghamton in 1973, and earned a doctorate in engineering from the California Institute of Technology in 1979. He is a professor of chemistry and engineering at Portland State University. Pankow has been an ISI highly cited researcher since 2003. In 2009, Pankow was elected a member of the United States National Academy of Engineering "for contributions to understanding the chemical thermodynamics of organic particulate matter in urban air and the global atmosphere."

== Recognition ==
In 1993, Dr. James F. Pankow received the John Wesley Powell Award (specifically the National Citizen Achievement Award) from the U.S. Geological Survey (USGS). In 1999, Pankow was co-awarded the American Chemical Society (ACS) Award for Creative Advances in Environmental Science and Technology in recognition of his pioneering research into how organic pollutants distribute themselves between gas and particulate phases in the atmosphere. In 2005, he won the Haagen-Smit Prize.
