= Wolfgang Knauss =

American engineering scientist

Wolfgang Gustav Knauss
- Education: California Institute of Technology (PhD) California Institute of Technology (M.S.) California Institute of Technology (B.S.)
- Scientific career
- Fields: Mechanics; Fracture; Elasticity
- Workplaces: California Institute of Technology
- Thesis: Rupture phenomena in viscoelastic materials (1963)
- Website: https://galcit.caltech.edu/people/wgk

Wolfgang Gustav Knauss (born December 12, 1933, in Mandel near Bad Kreuznach) is an American engineer. He was Theodore von Kármán Professor of Aeronautics and Applied Mechanics at Caltech.

== Education ==
Knauss grew up in Siegen during the Second World War as the son of a Methodist pastor. In 1954 he made his Abitur at the Helmholtz Realgymnasium in Heidelberg. After the war, the acquaintance of a Methodist pastor from Pasadena (Frank Williams), who visited the family in Heidelberg, enabled Knauss to attend Pasadena City College and study at Caltech from 1955 with a bachelor's degree in 1958. Originally, he wanted to study rocket technology, but ended up studying fracture mechanics with aeronautics professor Max L. Williams. He earned his master's degree in 1959 and received his doctorate in 1963.

== Research and career ==
Knauss became an assistant professor and carried out research on fracture propagation in viscoelastic materials on behalf of NASA, which was relevant to solid rocket engines. In 1969 he became Associate Professor and in 1978 Professor of Aeronautics and Applied Mechanics. From 2001 he held the Von Karman Professorship and in 2004 he retired. In 2010, he was awarded the Timoshenko Medal for fundamental contributions to fracture mechanics, including mixed-type fractures, dynamic fractures, interface and adhesion fractures, and microscale characterization of material behavior and failure with an emphasis on experimental mechanics. In 1986/87 he received the Humboldt Research Prize, working at Universities of Karlsruhe and Kassel. In 1977 he gave lectures in the Soviet Union at the invitation of the Soviet Academy of Sciences, later being named a Foreign Member and receiving the Kapitza Medal in 1997. In 1995 the Murray Medal of the Society for Experimental Mechanics. In 1998 he became a member of the National Academy of Engineering for contributions on time-dependent fracture mechanics of polymers, at interfaces and under dynamic loads. In 2001 he received the Koiter Medal from the American Society of Mechanical Engineers. He was the co-founder with Igor Emri of the Mechanics of Time Dependent Materials journal. Knauss advised aerospace companies such as Lockheed, Rocketdyne, Aerojet-General, Hercules, General Dynamics, and General Electric (GE Space Division) as well as polymer chemistry companies such as DuPont and Firestone. The Society for Experimental Mechanics introduced the Wolfgang Knauss Young Investigator Award after him in 2018.

== Awards and recognition ==
- National Academy of Engineering
- Fellow of the Society for Experimental Mechanics
- Honorary Member of the Society for Experimental Mechanics
- American Society of Mechanical Engineers Timoshenko Medal
- American Society of Mechanical Engineers Koiter Medal
- Society for Experimental Mechanics B.J. Lazan Award
- Society for Experimental Mechanics W.M. Murray Lecture Award

== Translation ==
This article is based in part or in whole on a translation of this version of the German Wikipedia article Wolfgang Knauss. The editors of the original article are listed in its page history. This indication merely indicates the origin of the wording and does not serve as a source for the information in this article.
