= Rob B. Phillips =

American biophysicist

Rob Phillips
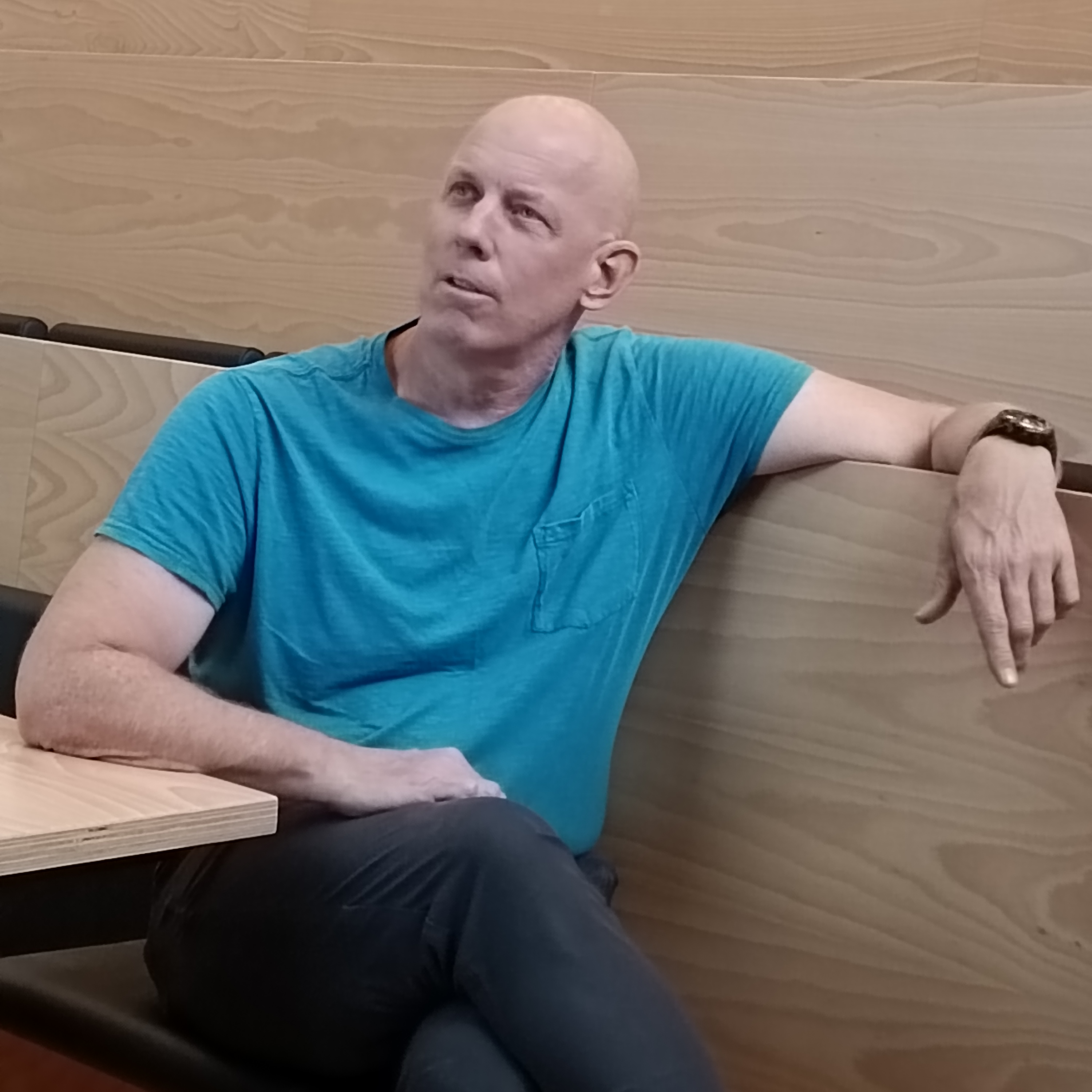
- Born: 1960 (age 65–66)
- Education: University of Minnesota (BS 1986, independent study); Washington University in St. Louis (PhD 1989)
- Scientific career
- Fields: Biophysics; Applied physics
- Workplaces: California Institute of Technology; Brown University

Rob Brooks Phillips (born 1960) is an American biophysicist. He is currently Fred and Nancy Morris Professor of Biophysics, Biology, and Physics at the California Institute of Technology (Caltech).

== Biography ==
Phillips originally did not intend to go to college and took an unconventional educational path, earning a bachelor's degree by independent study at the University of Minnesota in 1986. He then received his doctorate in physics at Washington University in St. Louis in 1989. He was a professor at Brown University and has been a professor at California Institute of Technology since 2000. He enjoys surfing.

== Awards ==
- Fellow, American Physical Society (2009)
- Fellow, American Academy of Arts and Sciences
- National Institutes of Health Director's Pioneer Award (2004)
- National Science Foundation CAREER Award
- Caltech ASCIT teaching award (2017)
- 2020–21 Richard P. Feynman Prize for Excellence in Teaching, Caltech's highest teaching prize

== Works ==
- Physical Biology of the Cell (textbook)
