= Quynh-Thu Le =

Vietnamese radiation oncologist

- Born: Huế, Vietnam
- Education: California Institute of Technology; University of California, San Francisco
- Scientific career
- Fields: Radiation oncology, head and neck cancer
- Workplaces: Stanford University

Quynh-Thu Le is a Vietnamese radiation oncologist specializing in head and neck cancer. She is the Katherine Dexter McCormick and Stanley McCormick Memorial Professor and chair of the department of radiation oncology at the Stanford University School of Medicine. Le co-directs the radiation biology program at the Stanford Cancer Institute.

== Life ==
Le was born in Huế near the Vietnamese Demilitarized Zone to a Buddhist family. Her father was a urologist who wished to remain in the country. After he was sent to a concentration camp and the Cambodian–Vietnamese War began, the family decided to they needed to escape. By obtaining false documents identifying them as a Chinese-Vietnamese family, they were able to leave the country as part of the Vietnamese boat people. After a perilous journey that involved being robbed by Thai pirates, the family arrived in Malaysia. They remained there in a beach camp supported by the International Red Cross for a month before being picked up by an Italy vessel and accepted as refugees. Le's family lived in Italy for two years while she completed middle school. In 1981, the family immigrated to Northern California where she completed high school.

Le majored in biology and chemistry at the California Institute of Technology. During her undergraduate studies, she completed three summer research fellowships. During one of these fellowships, Le's professor, Edwin S. Munger, encouraged her to research at a university and hospital in Durban which inspired her to pursue medicine. Le earned a M.D. from University of California, San Francisco in 1993. She decided to pursue radiation oncology after studying under Karen King-Wah Fu. She conducted an internal medicine internship at the Highland Hospital in 1994. Lee completed a radiation oncology residency at the University of California, San Francisco in 1997.

In 1997, Le joined the Stanford University School of Medicine as a clinical instructor focused on brain and lung cancers. In 2004, she became a co-director of the radiation biology program at the Stanford Cancer Institute. She worked in the laboratory of Amato J. Giaccia. In 2011, she succeeded Richard Hoppe MD as the chair of the department of radiation oncology. The same year, she was elected a fellow of the American College of Radiology. In 2013, Le was elected to the Institute of Medicine. In 2014, she was elected a fellow of the American Society of Therapeutic Radiation Oncology. Her research program focuses on radiation therapy in head and neck cancer. Le is the Katherine Dexter McCormick and Stanley McCormick Memorial Professor and chair of the department of radiation oncology.
