= Nadia Lapusta =

Professor of mechanical engineering and geophysics

- Education: Taras Shevchenko National University of Kyiv; Harvard University
- Known for: Continuum mechanics Earthquake physics
- Scientific career
- Workplaces: California Institute of Technology

Nadia Lapusta is a Professor of Mechanical Engineering and Geophysics at the California Institute of Technology. She designed the first computational model that could accurately and efficiently simulate sequence of earthquakes and interseismic slow deformation on a planar fault in a single consistent physical framework.

== Education and early career ==
Lapusta was born in Ukraine. She completed her bachelor's degree at Taras Shevchenko National University of Kyiv, where she graduated with the highest honours in 1994. She moved to America for her doctoral studies, earning a Master's degree in 1996 and a PhD in 2001. Her doctoral work considered the dynamics of frictional sliding on planar interfaces and was supervised by James R. Rice. During her doctoral studies she was awarded an outstanding student presentation award from the American Geophysical Union and Harvard University Certificate of Distinction in Teaching. Her thesis was awarded the Nicholas Metropolis Award for Outstanding Doctoral Thesis Work in Computational Physics from the American Physics Society.

== Research and career ==
Lapusta joined California Institute of Technology as an Assistant Professor of Mechanical Engineering and Geophysics in 2002. She is a member of the Caltech Seismological Laboratory and the Mechanical and Civil Engineering Faculty in the division of Engineering and Applied Science. Her research group focuses on studying mechanics of geomaterials, fundamentals of friction, solid-fluid interactions and earthquake source processes. In particular, Lapusta is interested in the mechanics and physics of seismic deformation and aseismic creep, and uses both analytical and numerical modelling to study friction and fracture phenomena. She was awarded a National Science Foundation CAREER Award to develop an interdisciplinary framework for the fundamental understanding and prediction of earthquake processes.

The unique computational framework developed by Lapusta and collaborators have provided transformative insights into the nature of earthquake processes and fault slip across scales. The model can predict the seismic (fast) and aseismic (slow) behaviour. She used this model to simulate various fault behaviours, including earthquake nucleation, post-seismic slip and inter-seismic deformation. Using a single model to simulate all fault behaviours made it possible for Lapusta et al. to demonstrate that during an earthquake the supposedly stable zones behave differently when penetrated by earthquake ruptures, and can in fact contribute to the generation of massive earthquakes through dynamic weakening. Her model could qualitatively reproduce the 2011 Tōhoku earthquake. uncovering the critical role of small scale frictional and hydromechanical processes and pointing to complex feedback interactions between fault slip, friction, and heterogeneous hydraulic properties that may qualitatively and quantitatively alter fault response from what may be inferred from small scale experiments Lapusta's work on small repeating earthquakes, interaction of seismic and aseismic slip in complex fault structures, and dynamic weakening that may potentially control the final size of an earthquake following its nucleation, has demonstrated the importance of rigorous mechanics-based modelling of earthquake processes, and how this may potentially be very informative to seismic hazard calculations particularly when data is scarce as it is the case for large earthquakes. For example, Lapusta studied the large areas of aseismic creep after the 2007 Peru earthquake, which can act to lower the seismic hazard in a particular region. Her computational work also includes using probabilistic inversion tools to understand tsunamis generated in during subduction zone earthquakes in deep-ocean trenches in Japan and Chile.

In collaboration with Ares Rosakis at Caltech, Lapusta is co-leading an National Science Foundation research project that aims at coupling rigorous computational tools and laboratory earthquake experiments to elucidate the fundamental nature of the dynamic friction laws and frictional slip modes across scales. Dynamic friction determines how earthquake ruptures move along faults such as the San Andreas Fault, but is still largely misunderstood. Lapusta applies her continuum mechanics based computational models to understand the interplay between friction, stress evolution, past seismicity, and future behaviour of fault segments.

In 2017 Lapusta was awarded the Caltech Graduate Student Council Mentoring Award. She was the vice chair of the Southern California Earthquake Center Board of Directors, and currently co-leads its interdisciplinary working group on Fault and Rock Mechanics. She has also been involved with the National Academy of Engineering Frontiers of Engineering program.
