= Mitchell Guttman =

Molecular biologist

- Born: October 31, 1984 (age 41); New York City, New York
- Education: University of Pennsylvania (BS); Massachusetts Institute of Technology (PhD)
- Awards: Wilson S. Stone Memorial Award MD Anderson Cancer Center (2014)
- Scientific career
- Fields: Computational biology Bioinformatics; Genomics; Molecular Biology
- Workplaces: California Institute of Technology
- Thesis: Functional large non-coding RNAs in mammals (2012)
- Doctoral advisor: Eric Lander
- Website: guttmanlab.caltech.edu

Mitchell Guttman is a molecular biologist. He works at the California Institute of Technology, where he is a professor in the Division of Biology and Biological Engineering and a Robertson Investigator of the New York Stem Cell Foundation. He also serves as the associate director of the UCLA-Caltech Medical Scientist Training Program (MD-PhD program).

He is known for the study of lncRNAs, among them regulating the plasticity of embryonic stem cells and controlling how stem cells become any other kind of cell.

== Early life and education ==
He earned a bachelor's degree in Molecular Biology and Computational Biology from the University of Pennsylvania in 2006. He completed his doctorate in biology from the Massachusetts Institute of Technology in 2012, supervised by Eric Lander.

== Career and research ==
Guttman's research aims to understand the mechanisms by which non-coding RNAs regulate gene expression. To address these questions, his lab has developed numerous tools to study lncRNA biology – including biochemical methods to comprehensively define proteins that interact with a specific RNA, molecular methods to map RNAs to chromatin and pre-mRNA, and genomic methods for mapping higher-order 3D organization of RNA and DNA in the nucleus.

Guttman's work has uncovered the detailed molecular mechanisms that enable Xist to exploit 3-dimensional proximity to identify its target sites on the X chromosome, interact with the SHARP/SMRT/HDAC3 complex to exclude RNA Polymerase II and silence transcription, and remodel the 3-dimensional structure of the X chromosome to enable chromosome-wide RNA spreading and silencing. These results have led to new paradigms in ncRNA biology, 3D genome organization, and gene regulation.

He has pioneered several molecular biology techniques to study RNA, DNA, and protein interactions in vivo. One of these, RNA antisense purification (RAP), was developed by Jesse Engreitz, a former graduate student in his lab, along with Guttman. RAP can be followed by DNA sequencing (RAP-DNA) or RNA sequencing (RAP-RNA) to study interactions, and has been expanded to include mass spectrometry (RAP-MS) to identify associated proteins. The method utilizes biotinylated oligonucleotides to hybridize to a specific RNA in crosslinked lysates, allowing the identification of DNA, RNA, or proteins that interact with the target RNA.

Another key development from Guttman's lab, led by graduate student Sofia Quinodoz, is SPRITE (Split-Pool Recognition of Interactions by Tag Extension), a genome-wide method for identifying multi-way interactions between RNA and DNA molecules. SPRITE revealed two mutually exclusive chromosomal hubs: one near the nucleolus, associated with low gene density, and another around nuclear speckles, enriched with highly transcribed Pol II genes.

Building on this, Guttman's team revisited the function of nuclear speckles, regions enriched in splicing factors, traditionally thought to be storage sites. Led by graduate student Prashant Bhat, they found that genome organization around nuclear speckles enhances the local concentration of splicing factors at active genes, thereby improving the efficiency of splicing in a cell-type-specific manner. This process helps cells produce the correct amounts of proteins required for proper cellular function.

He received a NIH Director's Early Independence Award in 2012 and was named a 2013 and 2014 Forbes magazine '30 under 30' in Science and Medicine.
