= Gerald Fuller =

American chemist

Gerald G. Fuller
- Education: Caltech; University of Calgary
- Known for: Rheology, complex fluids, complex fluid interfaces
- Awards: National Academy of Engineering Cox Medal for the Advancement of Undergraduate Research (Stanford); Bingham Medal of The Society of Rheology; Fellow of the American Physical Society; NSF Presidential Young Investigator Award President of The Society of Rheology
- Scientific career
- Fields: Chemical Engineering
- Workplaces: Stanford University

Gerald Gendall Fuller (born April 7, 1953) is a Canadian/American chemical engineer and Fletcher Jones II Professor of Chemical Engineering at Stanford University. He received his B.S. in chemical engineering from the University of Calgary in 1975 and his PhD in chemical engineering from Caltech in 1980.

Fuller participates in Stanford's CPIMA, a joint venture between the University of California and IBM, and is known for his work on the rheology of complex fluid interfaces and biocompatible structures, which has applications in tissue engineering. He authored a textbook on the optical rheometry of complex fluids.

In 2005, Fuller was elected as a member of the National Academy of Engineering for contributions toward understanding the rheology of complex fluids, fluid interfaces and rheo-optical technique development.
