= Tsvi Tlusty =

Theoretical physicist

- Education: Hebrew University of Jerusalem; Weizmann Institute of Science
- Scientific career
- Fields: Statistical physics Physics of living systems Theoretical biology
- Workplaces: Ulsan National Institute of Science and Technology; Institute for Advanced Study; Weizmann Institute of Science; Rockefeller University

Tsvi Tlusty is a theoretical physicist and distinguished professor of physics at the Ulsan National Institute of Science and Technology (UNIST). His work concerns how information and function take physical form in living matter, from molecular codes and protein mechanics to collective dynamics far from equilibrium.

== Career ==
Tlusty studied physics and mathematics at the Hebrew University of Jerusalem and received his master's degree and doctorate in physics from the Weizmann Institute of Science. After a fellowship at the Center for Studies in Physics and Biology at Rockefeller University, he returned to Weizmann as a senior researcher in the Department of Physics of Complex Systems. From 2011 to 2015, he was a member of the School of Natural Sciences at the Institute for Advanced Study. He joined UNIST in 2015.

== Research ==
His early work used information theory to treat biological codes as noisy channels. In a model of the genetic code, selection induces a transition from random to structured coding, while the topology of probable recognition errors constrains the number and arrangement of encoded meanings.

With Yonatan Savir, he introduced conformational proofreading, a mechanism of molecular recognition in which a controlled structural mismatch can sharpen discrimination among similar targets. They later applied the same principle to ribosomal decoding.

With Albert J. Libchaber and Jean-Pierre Eckmann, he developed a mechanical model of the protein genotype-to-phenotype map. In this view, proteins are evolvable amorphous matter, with function organized around soft, cooperative modes that transmit motion across the structure.

Later work connected this mechanical picture to catalysis. Experiments and theory showed that enzymes behave as viscoelastic catalytic machines: mutations in regions of high mechanical strain, including sites remote from the active site, altered both their mechanical response and catalytic activity.

In nonequilibrium physics, he and his collaborators identified long-lived quasiparticles and flat-band modes in a classical two-dimensional hydrodynamic system, using concepts usually associated with quantum matter to describe dissipative many-body dynamics.

With Eckmann, he showed that almost every walk in the rotation groups SO(3) or SU(2) returns preferentially to its origin when the rotations are uniformly scaled and the walk is traversed twice. The result followed earlier work on trajectoids, bodies shaped to roll along prescribed paths.
