= Kui-juan Jin =

Chinese physicist

Kui-juan Jin (Chinese: 金奎娟) is a Chinese physicist.

Jin studied optics at Shandong University. After completing her bachelor's degree, Jin pursued a doctorate at the Institute of Physics, Chinese Academy of Sciences. Jin engaged in postdoctoral research under the direction of Gerald Mahan at the University of Tennessee and Oak Ridge National Laboratory, then moved to Lund University, where she was advised by Koung-An Chao. Jin subsequently returned to China and IOPCAS, becoming a full professor in 2004. In 2012, Jin was elected a fellow of the American Physical Society, "[f]or her significant contribution in the crossing area of optics and condensed matter physics, including Fano resonance applying in some semiconductor systems, laser MBE growing and novel property revealing for peroveskite oxide heterostructures, and for her important role as a leading card for women in physics".
