= Lulu Qian =

Chinese-American biochemist and academic

- Born: China
- Education: Southeast University; Shanghai Jiao Tong University
- Scientific career
- Workplaces: California Institute of Technology
- Academic advisors: Erik Winfree

Lulu Qian is a Chinese-American biochemist who is a professor at the California Institute of Technology. Her research uses DNA-like molecules to build artificial machines.

== Early life and education ==
Qian is from China. She completed her bachelor's degree in biomedical engineering at Southeast University in Nanjing. Qian moved to Shanghai for her doctoral research, where she worked at Shanghai Jiao Tong University on biochemistry. She then moved to the California Institute of Technology as a postdoctoral fellow. At Caltech, she worked alongside Erik Winfree on biochemical circuits. She used a reversible strand displacement process to create a simple DNA-based building block for a biochemical logic circuit.

== Research and career ==
Qian joined the faculty at Caltech in 2013. She was promoted to professor in 2019. Her research considers molecular robotics and the self-assembly of nanostructures from DNA. These molecular robots can explore biologically relevant surfaces at the nanoscale, picking up molecules and transporting them to specific locations. In 2011, she created the world's largest DNA circuit, which included over seventy DNA molecules.

Qian has also created complex DNA origami. She created two-dimensional images from DNA origami tiles. She used DNA to create an artificial neural network. The network consisted of a DNA gate architecture that can be scaled up into multi-layer circuits.

== Awards and honors ==
- 2019 Foresight Institute Feynman Prize in nanotechnology
- 2023 Caltech Richard P. Feynman Prize for excellence in teaching

== Selected publications ==
- Lulu Qian; Erik Winfree (1 June 2011). "Scaling up digital circuit computation with DNA strand displacement cascades". Science. 332 (6034): 1196–1201. Bibcode:2011Sci...332.1196Q. doi:10.1126/science.1200520. ISSN 0036-8075. PMID 21636773. Wikidata Q34189459.
- Lulu Qian; Erik Winfree; Jehoshua Bruck (20 July 2011). "Neural network computation with DNA strand displacement cascades". Nature. 475 (7356): 368–372. doi:10.1038/nature10262. ISSN 1476-4687. PMID 21776082. Wikidata Q34027774.
- Anupama J Thubagere; Wei Li; Robert F. Johnson; et al. (1 September 2017). "A cargo-sorting DNA robot". Science. 357 (6356). doi:10.1126/science.aan6558. ISSN 0036-8075. PMID 28912216. Wikidata Q46277927.
