= Lilia Woods =

Bulgarian-American physicist

Lilia Milcheva Rapatinska Woods (born 1969) is a Bulgarian-American condensed matter physicist whose research interests include the thermoelectric effect as well as macroscopic quantum phenomena caused by quantum fluctuations, including the Casimir effect. She is a professor of physics at the University of South Florida.

== Education and career ==
Woods was born in Kyustendil, Bulgaria, in 1969, and has a bachelor's and master's degree in nuclear science from Sofia University in Bulgaria, received in 1993. After teaching at a high school for a year, she completed her Ph.D. under the supervision of Gerald Mahan at the University of Tennessee. Her 1999 doctoral dissertation was Electron-phonon effects in graphene and an armchair (10,10) single wall carbon nanotube.

She became a faculty member at the University of South Florida after postdoctoral research at the Oak Ridge National Laboratory and at the United States Naval Research Laboratory.

== Book ==
Woods is a coauthor of the book Contemporary Quantum Mechanics in Practice: Problems and Solutions (with Pablo Rodríguez López, Cambridge University Press, 2024).

== Recognition ==
Woods was named as woman physicist of the month by the American Physical Society (APS) in 2017. She was elected as a Fellow of the American Physical Society in 2017, after a nomination from the APS Division of Condensed Matter Physics, "for her seminal contributions to the theory of fluctuation-induced and thermoelectric phenomena in condensed matter physics". She became a Fellow of the American Association for the Advancement of Science in 2019, "for distinguished contributions to condensed matter and materials physics, particularly for theory and predictions of thermoelectric transport mechanisms and dispersive interactions in novel materials".
