= Yaser Abu-Mostafa =

Egyptian-American computer scientist

Yaser S. Abu-Mostafa
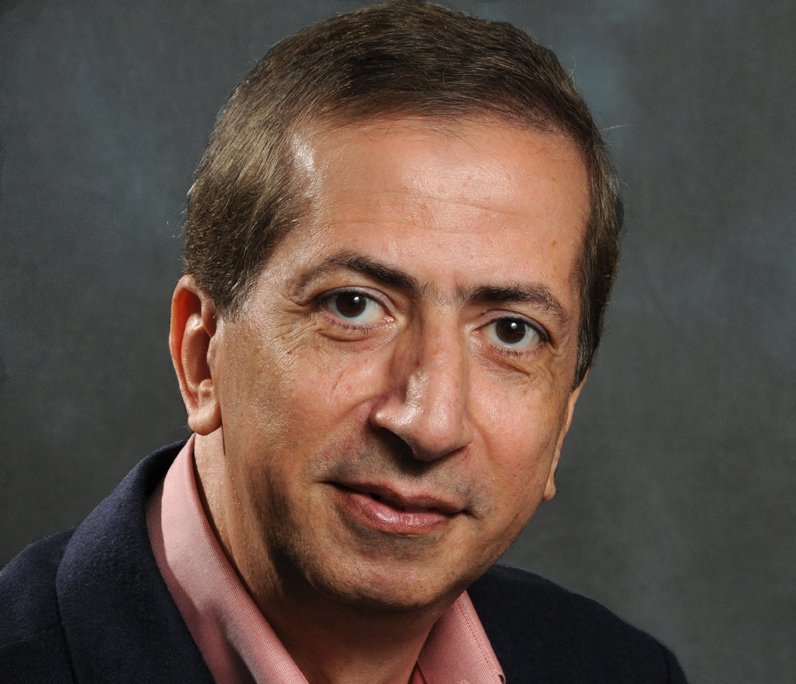
- Born: March 3, 1957 (age 69)
- Education: California Institute of Technology; Georgia Institute of Technology; Cairo University
- Known for: Machine learning
- Scientific career
- Fields: Computer Science; Electrical Engineering
- Workplaces: California Institute of Technology
- Doctoral advisor: Demetri Psaltis

Yaser Said Abu-Mostafa (Arabic: ياسر سعيد أبو مصطفى) is an Egyptian-American Professor of Electrical Engineering and Computer Science at the California Institute of Technology, Chairman of Paraconic Technologies Ltd, and Chairman of Machine Learning Consultants LLC. He is known for his research and educational activities in the area of machine learning.

== Academic biography ==
Abu-Mostafa studied at Cairo University, where he earned the BSc degree in 1979. He earned the MS degree at the Georgia Institute of Technology in 1981 and the PhD degree at the California Institute of Technology in 1983. He has been on the faculty of the California Institute of Technology since 1983.

In 1987, Abu-Mostafa cofounded the Conference on Neural Information Processing Systems (NeurIPS), a major machine learning meeting. He is known for his textbook on machine learning. He has also developed an online course about machine learning.
