= Gerald Mahan =

American physicist (1937–2021)

- Born: Gerald Dennis Mahan; November 24, 1937; Portland, Oregon, United States
- Died: November 21, 2021 (aged 83)
- Education: Harvard University (AB); University of California, Berkeley (PhD)
- Scientific career
- Fields: Condensed matter physics
- Workplaces: General Electric Research Laboratory; University of Oregon; Indiana University; Pennsylvania State University
- Thesis: Some optical properties of dielectrics (1964)
- Doctoral advisor: John Hopfield
- Doctoral students: Lilia Woods

Gerald Dennis Mahan (November 24, 1937 – November 21, 2021) was an American condensed matter physicist, with specific research interests in transport and optical properties of materials, and solid-state devices. He is recognized for his work in quantum thermoelectricity and the invention of the zinc oxide varistor. He is also developed the time-dependent local-density approximation (TDLDA) and its author of various books in quantum many-body physics.

Mahan worked at General Electric Research Laboratory (1963–1967) and was a professor of physics at the University of Oregon (1967–1973), Indiana University (1973–1984), University of Tennessee (1984–2001), and Pennsylvania State University (2001–2021). He also worked at Oak Ridge National Laboratory (1984–2001).

== Life ==
=== Early life and education ===
Gerald Dennis Mahan was born in Portland, Oregon in 1937.

Mahan graduated valedictorian from Franklin High School. He studied physics at Harvard University and graduated magna cum laude in 1959. In 1964, under John Hopfield at the University of California, Berkeley he received his PhD in physics for explaining linear dispersion in excitations.

=== Career ===
Upon graduation he became a research scientist at General Electric Research Laboratory (1963–1967). He worked full-time for General Electric (GE) until 1967 and then spent another 28 years working for them part-time, one of the longest part time continuous relationships in GE research history.

In 1967, Mahan became a professor of physics at the University of Oregon. While at Oregon he continued his work on the x-ray edge and expanded it to include surface science and the microscopic theory of dielectrics. He was awarded a Sloan Research Fellowship from the Alfred P. Sloan Foundation and spent 1970 working at the Cavendish Laboratory of Cambridge University, England. Mahan became a professor at Indiana University in 1973.

During his tenure at Indiana, he was invited by Stig Lundqvist of Chalmers University and the Niels Bohr Institute to spend a sabbatical year working at Chalmers in Gothenburg, Sweden. This fostered a long collaboration with Chalmers and Swedish physics. In 1984 the University of Tennessee and Oak Ridge National Laboratory created a joint Distinguished Scientist program to raise the quality and profile of science in Tennessee. Mahan was recruited as the first member of that program and moved to Tennessee. He continued his research but spent much of his time as a research manager. During Lamar Alexander's tenure as President of the University of Tennessee, he recruited Mahan to teach freshman physics, which he did for ten years. At that time, there were not many members of the National Academy of Science teaching freshman physics. In 2001, Mahan was recruited to join the faculty of Pennsylvania State University as a distinguished professor. He expanded his areas of expertise to include thermoelectrics and thermal transport systems in nanotubes. He retired from Penn State in 2016 and served as an adjunct professor at the Massachusetts Institute of Technology from 2016 until 2020.

Later in his career, Mahan served as a leader of scientific organizations both in the United States and globally. He served as a general councilor (board of directors) of the American Physical Society. He served as secretary (head) of Section III of the National Academy of Science. Section III includes Applied Math, Computer Science, Engineering and Applied Physical Science. He also served as secretary of Section 33 (Applied Physical Science). He served as the first chairman of the International Centre for Condensed Matter Physics (ICCMP) in Brasília, Brazil. In his role as chairman of ICCMP he traveled relentlessly to foster collaboration between South American and US and European physicists.

== Work ==
While at GE, Mahan pioneered the application of mathematical techniques developed by three Russians: Alexei Abrikosov, Lev Gor'kov and Igor Dzyaloshinskii; to adapt Green's functions to theoretical solid-state physics. The x-ray edge theory was part of this work. The results produced using this method, while controversial at the time, were almost universally supported by later experimental results and eventually became accepted as fundamental mathematical techniques. Charles Duke worked closely with Mahan while they were both at GE and learned and applied these techniques leading to discoveries in the tunneling of electrons across semiconductor diodes. He is quoted in an interview as saying that "basically, Gerry taught me solid-state physics".

During his tenure at Indiana, he expanded his areas of work to include varistors, which he did in conjunction with colleagues from GE. He developed mathematical models that explained how varistors function (they are extremely non-linear devices) leading to substantial improvements in their effectiveness. He worked closely with Lloyd Chase and did the first Raman scattering of beta-alumina which is used to make high-density solid-state batteries.

He continued to expand his areas of interest and co-invented the time-dependent local density approximation (TDLDA) which built on Walter Kohn's work inventing local density approximation (LDA). He later wrote a book on the subject with Kumble Subbaswammy (a former PhD student) titled Local Density Theory of Polarizability.

Mahan was committed to the development of scientific talent and had several post doctorate students while at Indiana. These included Steven Girvin (postdoc for 2 years from 1977 to 1978), Wilfried Haensch (postdoc for 2 years from 1981 to 1982), William Pardee, Ji-Wie Wu, Mats Jonson and Petter Minnhagen. Wilfried Haensch did pioneering work with Mahan explaining the current drag problem in semi-conductors and separate work with Mahan using new analytical methods to explain the quantum Bolzmann equation which describes the transport of electricity in heat and solids.

In Penn State University, he worked with Peter Eklund on vibrational properties of carbon nanotubes and silicon nanowires.

== Awards and honors ==
Mahan was recognized for his pioneering work. He was elected as a fellow of the American Physical Society (1974), member of the National Academy of Sciences (1995), American Academy of Arts and Sciences (2005), foreign member of the Royal Society of Arts and Sciences in Gothenburg, Sweden (2008), and Erasmus Mundas Lecturer of the European Union (2011). He received an honorary doctorate from Chalmers University, Goteborg Sweden in 2016.

His awards include

- National Science Foundation Predoctoral Fellow, 1959–1961
- Sloan Research Fellow, 1968–1970
- Luther Dana Waterman Research Award, 1979, co-winner, Outstanding Scientist at Indiana University
- Dushman Award, 1984, co-winner, General Electric Company, for development of the ZnO varistor
- Centennial Medal, Catholic University of Chile, 1989
- Eberly College of Science Medal, 2007
- Outstanding Achievement in Thermoelectrics Award from the International Thermoelectric Society, 2015

== Selected publications ==
=== Books ===
- Mahan, G.D. (1990). Many particle physics (2nd ed.). Springer. ISBN 978-0-306-43423-5.
- Mahan, G.D. (2000). Many particle physics (3rd ed.). Springer. ISBN 978-1-4419-3339-3.
- Mahan, G.D. (2011). Condensed Matter in a Nutshell (2nd ed.). Princeton University Press. ISBN 978-0-691-14016-2.
- Mahan, G.D. (2009). Quantum Mechanics in a Nutshell. Princeton University Press. ISBN 978-0-691-13713-1.
- Mahan, G.D.; Subbaswamy, K.R. (1990). Local Density Theory of Polarizability. Plenum Press. ISBN 978-1-4613-5493-2.
- Mahan, G.D. (2002). Applied Mathematics. Springer. ISBN 978-1-4613-5493-2.
- Cahn, S.B.; Mahan, G.D.; Nadgorny, B.E. (2004). A Guide to Physics Problems (Part 2): Thermodynamics, Statistical Physics, and quantum mechanics. Kluwer academic publishers. ISBN 0-306-45291-X.
- Mahan, Gerald D.; Roth, Walter L., eds. (2013). Superionic Conductors. Springer. ISBN 978-1-4615-8789-7. (ebook)

=== Papers ===
- Mahan, G.D. (2009). "Kapitza resistance between a metal and a nonmetal". Phys. Rev. B. 79 075408. doi:10.1103/PhysRevB.79.075408.
- Duarte, N.; Mahan, G.D.; Tadigadapa, S. (2009). "Thermopower enhancement in nanowires via junction effects". Nano Letters. 9 (2): 617–22. Bibcode:2009NanoL...9..617D. doi:10.1021/nl802882h. PMID 19166287.
- Jeon, G.S.; Mahan, G.D. (2009). "Lattice vibrations of a single-wall boron nitride nanotube". Phys. Rev. 79 (8) 085424. Bibcode:2009PhRvB..79h5424J. doi:10.1103/PhysRevB.79.085424.
- Mahan, G.D. (2010). "Theory of surface polaritons and image potentials in polar crystals". Phys. Rev. B. 81 (19) 195318. Bibcode:2010PhRvB..81s5318M. doi:10.1103/PhysRevB.81.195318.
- M. W. Cole, V. H. Crespi, M. S. Dresselhaus, G. Dresselhaus, J. E. Fischer, H. Rodriguez Gutierrez, K. Kojima, G. D. Mahan, A. M. Rao, J. O. Sofo, M. Tachibana, K. Wako, Q. Xiong (2010). "Structural, electronic, optical and vibrational properties of nanoscale carbons and nanowires: a colloquial review". J. Phys. Condens. Matter. 22 (33) 334201. Bibcode:2010JPCM...22G4201C. doi:10.1088/0953-8984/22/33/334201. PMID 21386491. S2CID 2513464..
- M. W. Cole, V. H. Crespi, G. Dresselhaus, M. S. Dresselhaus, G. Mahan, and J. O. Sofo (2010). "Peter Clay Eklund: a scientific biography". J. Phys. Condens. Matter. 22 (33) 330301. doi:10.1088/0953-8984/22/33/330301. PMID 21386361.
- Mahan, G.D. (2010). "Quantization of surface polaritons". Phys. Rev. B. 82 (16) 165318. Bibcode:2010PhRvB..82p5318M. doi:10.1103/PhysRevB.82.165318.
- Mahan, G.D. (2011). "Thermal Transport in AB superlattices". Phys. Rev. B. 83 (12) 125313. Bibcode:2011PhRvB..83l5313M. doi:10.1103/PhysRevB.83.125313.
- Mahan, G.D. (2011). "The tunneling of heat". Appl. Phys. Lett. 98 (13): 132106. Bibcode:2011ApPhL..98m2106M. doi:10.1063/1.3573800.
- Mahan, G.D.; Berland, K. (2011). "Theory of polar corrections to donor binding". Phys. Rev. B. 84 (3): 235203. Bibcode:2011PhRvB..84c5203C. doi:10.1103/PhysRevB.84.035203.
