= Claire Gu =

Chinese-American optical engineer

Claire Xiang-Guang Gu is a Chinese and American optical engineer whose research interests have included fiber optics and fiber-optic sensors, holographic data storage and optical computing, liquid crystals, and nonlinear optics. She is a professor emerita of electrical and computer engineering at the University of California, Santa Cruz.

== Education and career ==
After a 1985 bachelor's degree from Fudan University, Gu received her Ph.D. in 1990 from the California Institute of Technology. Her doctoral dissertation, Optical neural networks using volume holograms, was supervised by Demetri Psaltis.

Gu was a postdoctoral researcher at Rockwell International at the Rockwell Science Center in Thousand Oaks, California, and then became an assistant professor at Pennsylvania State University in 1992. She moved to the University of California, Santa Cruz in 1997.

== Book ==
Gu is a coauthor of the book Optics of Liquid Crystal Displays (with Pochi Yeh, Wiley, 1999; 2nd ed., 2010).

== Recognition ==
Gu was elected as a Fellow of SPIE in 2007. She was named an Optica Fellow in 2011, "for contributions to information photonics including photorefractive devices for information processing, holographic data storage, fiber optic devices for communications and surface enhanced Raman sensors, and liquid crystal displays".
