= David Gilbert Thomas =

Chemist (1928–2015)

David Gilbert Thomas (4 August 1928, London, England – 9 May 2015, Torrington, Connecticut) was a chemist and solid-state physicist, known for his work at Bell Labs on the optical properties of semiconductors.

== Education and career ==
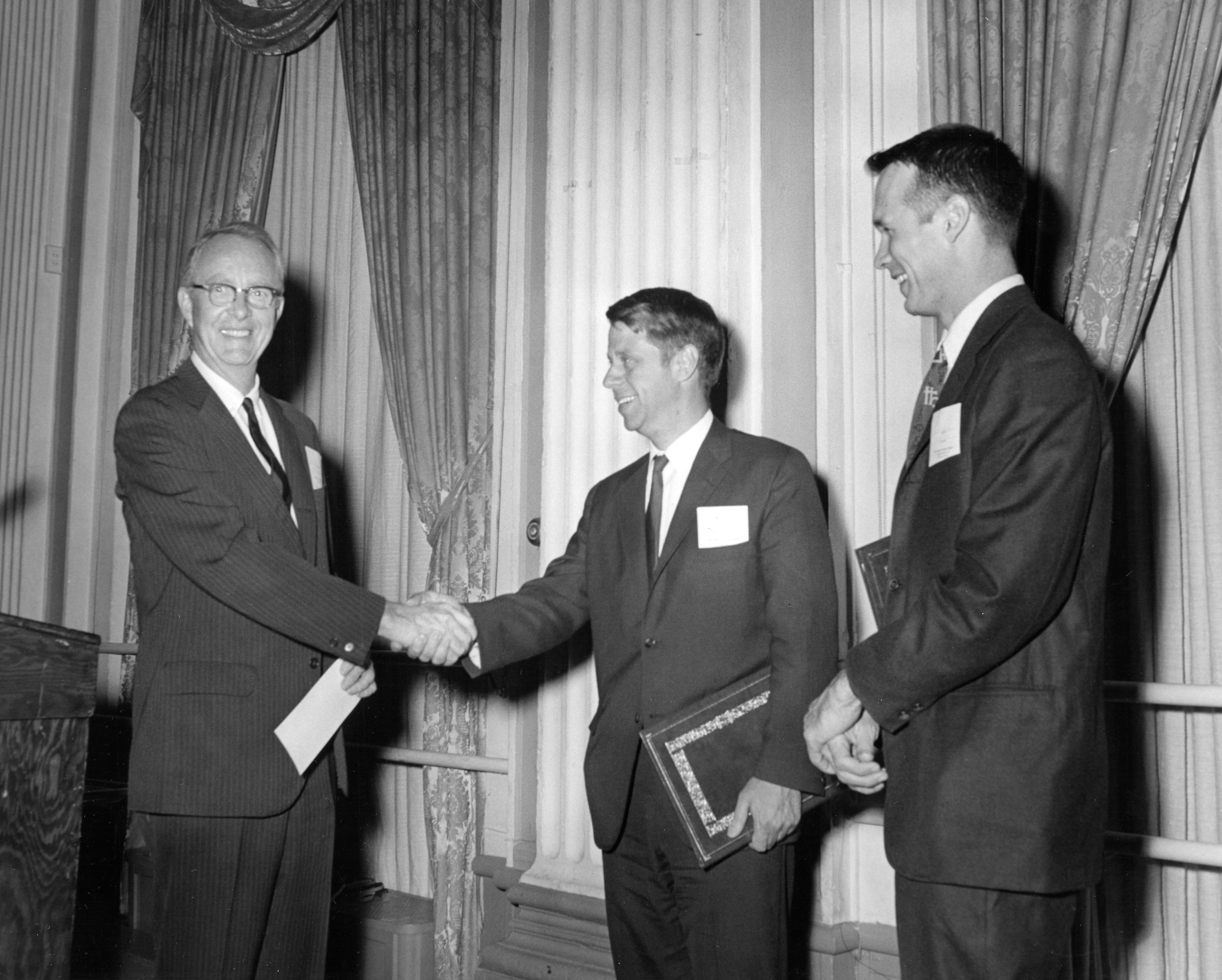
The 1969 ceremony of the Oliver E. Buckley Prize of condensed matter physics. Luis Walter Alvarez (left) congratulates Thomas (middle) and John Hopfield (right).

Thomas was educated at Harrow School and at The Putney School in Vermont, before he matriculated at Oxford University, where received his three chemistry degrees: studying firstly at Oriel College for his BA (awarded 1949) and MA (awarded 1950); then at Merton College for his DPhil, awarded in 1952. From 1952 to 1954 he was a researcher for the Royal Military College in Kingston, Canada, and then in 1954 joined Bell Laboratories, where he worked for 38 years. In 1960 he became a U.S. citizen.

After becoming Head of the Semiconductor Electronics Research Department in 1962, Mr. Thomas conducted studies leading to the development of gallium phosphide light-emitting diodes, which were used extensively as indicator lights of maintenance equipment, control panels, and some new multiline telephones and business telephone consoles. A practical application at the time was the "Princess" phone which lit up with a green glow when lifted from its handset. In 1969, Mr. Thomas moved from research into development and became the Executive Director of the Electronic Devices, Process and Materials Division responsible for the development of electronic devices, including their materials and fabrication.

In 1969 he received, for joint research with John Hopfield, the Oliver E. Buckley Condensed Matter Prize of the American Physical Society.

Mr. Thomas was also the holder of seven patents, one of which was awarded to him and his colleague Willard S. Boyle. This patent helped lead to the development of the semiconductor injection laser, which is found in many electronic appliances. In 1976, Mr. Thomas became Executive Director of Bell Laboratories' Transmission Systems Division. His chief activity here was to oversee the development and design of a variety of transmission systems, and to assist in their introduction into manufacture. These systems included digital fiber optic systems for terrestrial use, and also submarine fiber optic systems for transoceanic use. The 1988 submarine fiber optic system that Mr. Thomas worked on was designed to increase phone transmissions from the United States, England and France to 40,000 simultaneous phone calls. One of the challenges that arose were sharks who, sensing the magnetic field created by the cable's high voltage, bit them. Thicker cable were subsequently designed to help with this problem. Mr. Thomas continued to work at Bell Laboratories until 1992.

== Family ==
Thomas's wife, June, whom he married in 1957, died in January 2015. He was survived by his daughters Virginia S. Thomas and Victoria C. Thomas, as well as, granddaughters Eliza K. Lupone and Madeline J. Lupone.
