= Helen Hopfield =

American physicist (1899–1989)

- Born: Helen Staff; 1899; Fort Atkinson, Wisconsin, United States
- Died: January 16, 1989 (aged 89–90); United States
- Education: Mount Holyoke College
- Known for: Hopfield model for the troposphere
- Spouse: John J. Hopfield
- Children: 3, including John
- Scientific career
- Fields: Atmospheric physics
- Workplaces: University of California, Berkeley; Applied Physics Laboratory

Helen Hopfield (née Staff, 1899 – January 16, 1989) was an American physicist who worked at the Applied Physics Laboratory. Her contributions in atmospheric physics and orbital mechanics allowed for more precise satellite-tracking technologies. The Hopfield model to study the troposphere is named in her honor.

She was the wife of spectroscopist John J. Hopfield, also a physicist known for his research on ultraviolet spectroscopy, and the mother of John Joseph, Jr., a winner of the Nobel Prize in Physics.

== Biography ==
=== Education ===
Hopfield was born in Fort Atkinson, Wisconsin. She completed her higher education with distinction in her A.B. degree in physics from Colorado College in 1921 and an M.A. in physics from Mount Holyoke College in 1924. Her early academic career included teaching positions in physics and mathematics at Winthrop College in South Carolina and a teaching fellowship at the University of California, Berkeley from 1926 to 1928.

=== Career ===
Hopfield joined the Applied Physics Laboratory (APL) at Johns Hopkins University in 1943, where she remained a key figure until her retirement in 1976, after which she continued part-time work until 1980. Her work at APL focused on the early developments of satellite tracking, particularly in refining models for orbital determination. She collaborated with colleagues on complex software systems designed to analyze satellite data, contributing to the development of nonlinear least-squares fitting algorithms used in orbit modelling.

One of Hopfield’s most notable contributions was her analysis of tropospheric refraction effects on Doppler satellite tracking data. This work addressed the challenges posed by atmospheric interference in satellite communications and positioning, a problem that had previously been considered too complex due to its dependence on variable weather conditions. Her successful modelling of these effects improved the accuracy of satellite orbit predictions, reducing errors from approximately 150 meters to much finer resolutions. She is credited for developing the Hopfield model, which calculates zenith tropospheric delays based on the relationship between refractive indices at the Earth’s surface and at a given height.

== Family ==
Hopfield was married to John J. Hopfield Sr., a physicist known for his discovery of several ultraviolet bands in the solar spectrum. Together, they had three children, including John J. Hopfield Jr., who would go on to become a physicist notably credited with the development of the Hopfield network as well as other foundational works in physics, biophysics and computational neuroscience.

Hopfield died on January 16, 1989. She was survived by her three children.
