= John J. Hopfield (spectroscopist) =

American spectroscopist (1891–1953)

- Born: Jan Józef Chmielewski; July 8, 1891; Płock, Poland
- Died: January 8, 1953 (aged 61); Maryland, United States
- Education: Syracuse University (A.B. 1917); University of California, Berkeley (Ph.D. 1923)
- Spouse: Helen Hopfield
- Children: 3, includjng John
- Scientific career
- Doctoral advisor: E. P. Lewis; Raymond Thayer Birge

John Joseph Hopfield (born Jan Józef Chmielewski; July 8, 1891 – January 8, 1953) was a Polish-American physicist. Hopfield's published research included vacuum ultraviolet spectroscopy and solar ultraviolet spectroscopy. He was the discoverer of the "Hopfield bands" of oxygen and co-discoverer of the "Lyman–Birge–Hopfield bands" of nitrogen. For about a decade he was an industrial physicist working with technologies for fabricating glass windows, and was the inventor listed on several related patents.

== Career ==
Hopfield was born Jan Józef Chmielewski in 1891 in Płock, Poland and was orphaned at an early age. He grew up in an orphanage in Poland and briefly stayed with a Pennsylvania Dutch family in the United States before running away. Despite little formal education, he supported himself by teaching at a district school.

Hopfield was admitted to Syracuse University around 1913, completed his A.B. degree in 1917, and then worked as an instructor through 1919. At Syracuse, he had worked as an assistant with Raymond Thayer Birge, who moved to University of California, Berkeley around this time. Hopfield was then admitted to Berkeley with a fellowship, and was awarded his doctorate for spectroscopic work in 1923. He became an instructor and assistant professor of physics at Berkeley, and was awarded a Guggenheim Fellowship in 1928 to work with Friedrich Paschen for a year in Berlin.

By the time he left Berlin in 1929, the stock market crash and depression had ended most new faculty hiring. Purdue University appointed him as a National Research Council Fellow for two years. He next was employed in creating the physics exhibit for the 1933 "Century of Progress" World's Fair in Chicago. This was followed by a position with the Libbey-Owens-Ford glass company in Toledo, Ohio. With the onset of the Second World War, physicists were again in great demand, and he moved to Washington, D.C., to participate in war-related research. The end of his career was spent at the Johns Hopkins University Applied Physics Laboratory and at the Naval Research Laboratory in the Optics Division in Washington, D.C. On January 8, 1953, Hopfield died after a brief illness.

Hopfield's son, J. J. Hopfield, was born in 1933 and also became a noted physicist, receiving the 2024 Nobel Prize in Physics.

== Select publications ==
- Ultraviolet Absorption and Emission Spectra of Carbon Monoxide
- The Ultra-Violet Band Spectrum of Nitrogen
- New Ultra-Violet Spectrum of Helium
- Absorption and Emission Spectra in the Region λ 600-1100.
- New Oxygen Spectra in the Ultraviolet and new Spectra in Nitrogen
- Preparation of Schumann plates
- The Ultraviolet Spectrum of the Sun from V-2 Rockets

== Patents ==
- Line image producer
- Manufacture of multiple glass sheet glazing units
- Uniting of glass to glass and metals to glass
- Multiple glass sheet glazing unit and method of making the same
- Multiply glass sheet glazing unit
- Method of fabricating multiple glass sheet glazing units
