= Demetri Psaltis =

Greek-American electrical engineer (born 1953)

- Born: 1953 (age 72–73)
- Education: Carnegie Mellon University
- Scientific career
- Fields: Electrical engineering
- Workplaces: Caltech; EPFL
- Doctoral advisor: David Casasent
- Doctoral students: Claire Gu; Yaser Abu-Mostafa

Demetri Psaltis (Greek: Δημήτρης Ψάλτης) is a Greek-American electrical engineer who was the Dean of the School of Engineering at École Polytechnique Fédérale de Lausanne from 2007 to 2017. Since 2024 he is a professor emeritus at EPFL. He is one of the founders of the term and the field of optofluidics. He is also well known for his past work in holography, especially with regards to optical computing, holographic data storage, and neural networks. He is an author of over 1100 publications, contributed more than 20 book chapters, invented more than 50 patents, and currently has a h-index of 105.

== Education ==
Demetri Psaltis received his B.S. (1974), M.S. (1975), and Ph.D. (1977) at Carnegie Mellon University.

== Academic career ==
From 1980 to 2007, he worked at Caltech as an Assistant Professor (1980–1985), Associate Professor (1985–1990), Full Professor (1990–1996), Executive Officer for Computation and Neural Systems (1992–1996), Director for the National Science Foundation Center for Neuromorphic Systems Engineering (1996–1999), Thomas G. Myers Professor (1996–2007) and Director for the DARPA Center for Optofluidic Integration (2004–2007). In 2007, he moved to Switzerland as a Professor and Dean of the School of Engineering at EPFL.

His past research had focused on optical computing, holographic data storage, neural networks, optofluidics and on nonlinear optics particularly in scattering media.

His current research focuses on optical computing for neural networks and imaging through optical fibers.

== Honors ==
- 2016 Joseph Fraunhofer Award/Robert M. Burley Prize.
- 2012 Emmett N. Leith Medal.
- 2006 SPIE Dennis Gabor Award.
- 2005 IEEE Fellow for contributions to the application of holography to information processing.
- 2003 Humboldt Prize for Senior U.S. Scientists.
- 2002 NASA Space Act Award.
- 1997 SPIE Fellow.
- 1989 International Commission for Optics (ICO) Prize for contributions in Optical Information Processing.
- OSA Fellow.

== Lectures ==
- 1992 - Optical implementation of neural networks Lecture sponsored by the Dept. of Electrical and Computer engineering, University of California, San Diego. Electrical and Computer Engineering Distinguished Lecture Series. Digital object made available by UC San Diego Library.
