= Conformational proofreading =

Mechanism in molecular recognition

Conformational proofreading is a general mechanism of molecular recognition systems, suggested by Yonatan Savir and Tsvi Tlusty, in which introducing an energetic barrier - such as a structural mismatch between a molecular recognizer and its target - can enhance recognition specificity. Conformational proofreading does not require the consumption of energy and may therefore be used in any molecular recognition system. Conformational proofreading is especially useful in scenarios where the recognizer has to select the appropriate target among many similar competitors. Proteins evolve the capacity for conformational proofreading through fine-tuning their geometry, flexibility and chemical interactions with the target.

== Balancing correct and incorrect binding ==
Molecular recognition takes place in a noisy, crowded biological environment and the recognizer often has to cope with the task of selecting its target among a variety of similar competitors. For example, the ribosome has to select the correct tRNA that matches the mRNA codon among many structurally similar tRNAs. If the recognizer and its correct target match perfectly like a lock and a key, then the binding probability will be high since no deformation is required upon binding. At the same time, the recognizer might also bind to a competitor with a similar structure with high probability. Introducing an energy barrier, in particular, structural mismatch between the recognizer (lock) and the key, reduces the binding probability to the correct target but reduces even more the binding probability to a similar wrong target and thus improves the specificity. Yet, introducing too much deformation drastically reduces binding probability to the correct target. Therefore, the optimal balance between maximizing the correct binding probability and minimizing the incorrect binding probability is achieved when the recognizer is slightly off target. This suggests that conformational changes during molecular recognition processes, such as the induced fit mechanism, are advantageous for enhancing the specificity of recognition. Such conformational changes may be fine-tuned by mutations that affect the mechanical response of the recognizer, also at positions far from the binding site.

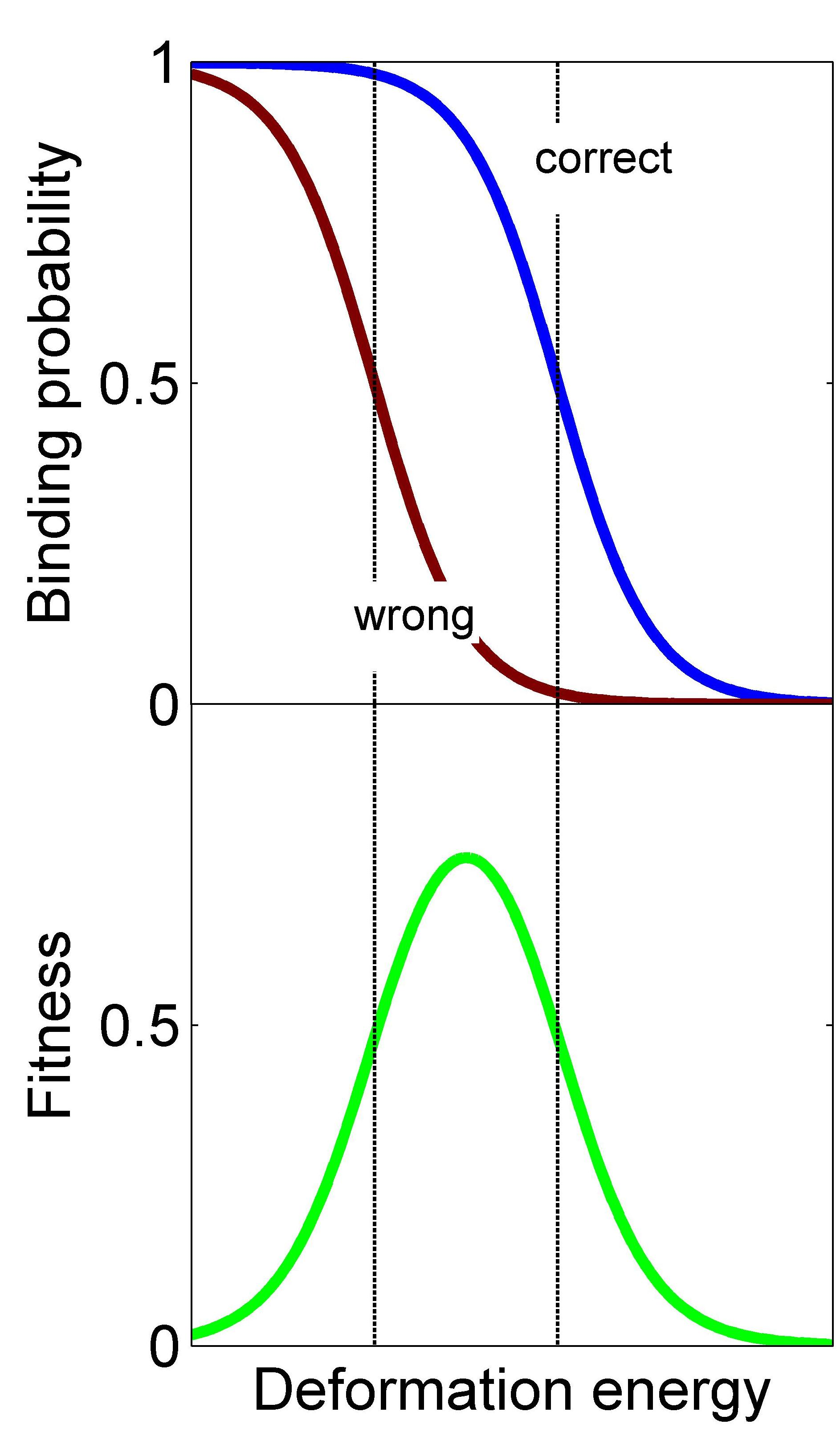
Conformational proofreading in homologous recombination. Top: The binding probability to homologous (correct) and non-homologous (wrong) DNA sequences decrease with the deformation energy barrier. The wrong binding probability decreases before the correct one. Bottom: As a result, the Fitness which is the difference, Fitness = Prob(Correct) − Prob(Wrong), is maximal at a non-zero deformation energy. This barrier is optimal in the sense that it significantly reduces the binding probability while keeping the correct binding probability roughly the same. Biochemical measurements of RecA-induced recombination suggest that the observed deformation is nearly optimal.

== Use by homologous recombination for homology search ==
The mechanism of conformational proofreading is utilized in the system of homologous recombination to discern between similar DNA sequences. Homologous recombination facilitates the exchange of genetic material between homologous DNA molecules. This crucial process requires detecting a specific homologous DNA sequence within a huge variety of heterologous sequences. The detection is mediated by RecA in E. coli, or members of its superfamily in other organisms. RecA first polymerizes along a stretch of single-stranded DNA, and then this protein-DNA filament searches for homology along double-stranded DNA. In the RecA-DNA filament, the distance between bases increases significantly with respect to the bare 3.4 Å in the double-strand (by 50% on average). This sets a significant energetic barrier on the search, since the double-stranded DNA has to stretch by the same magnitude to check for homology. By formulating the DNA recognition process as a signal detection problem, it was shown that the experimentally observed RecA-induced DNA deformation and the binding energetics are fine-tuned to ensure optimal sequence detection. The amount of deformation is such that binding to homologous DNA sequences only slightly decreases, while binding to wrong sequences decreases significantly. This is consistent with conformational proofreading.

=== Experimental evidence for conformational proofreading by homologous recombination ===
The group of C. Dekker (Delft University) directly probed the interactions involved in homology search by combining magnetic and optical tweezers. They have found that homology search and recognition requires opening of the helix and can therefore be accelerated by unwinding the DNA. This is exactly the energy barrier predicted by the conformational proofreading model. The data indicate a physical picture for homology recognition in which the fidelity of the search process is governed by the distance between the DNA-binding sites. The authors conclude that their interpretation of the measurements "is akin to a conformational proofreading scheme ... where the dsDNA, and not the RecA filament, is the active, recognizing search entity. A large conformational mismatch exists between the target-bound and unbound states of the dsDNA. The target-bound state is accessed via energetically unfavorable intermediate states, as discussed above. The conformational mismatch improves the selectivity of the recognition reaction." In other words, they identified the energetic barrier and have shown that indeed the double-stranded DNA is the active participant, since it has to pass this barrier.

== Use by ribosome for tRNA decoding ==
The ribosome is a complex molecular machine that, in order to synthesize proteins during the translation process, has to decode mRNAs by pairing their codons with matching tRNAs. Decoding is a major determinant of fitness and requires accurate and fast selection of correct tRNAs among many similar competitors. Most binding events involve non-matching (“non-cognate”) tRNAs and the ribosome needs to reject those as fast as possible in order to vacate the binding site. At the same time, the ribosome should keep the matching tRNAs bound long enough to allow the protein synthesis process ensue. Despite the importance of tRNA decoding, it was unclear whether the modern ribosome, and in particular its large conformational changes during decoding, are the outcome of adaptation to its task as a decoder or the result of other constraints. Recent study derived the energy landscape that provides optimal discrimination between competing tRNA substrates, and thereby optimal tRNA decoding. The optimal landscape is a symmetric one (see image). The study shows that the measured landscape of the prokaryotic ribosome is indeed symmetric. This model suggests that conformational changes of the ribosome and tRNA during decoding are means to obtain such an optimal tRNA decoder. The fact that both homologous recombination and tRNA decoding utilize conformational proofreading suggests that this is a generic mechanism that may be utilized broadly by molecular recognition systems.

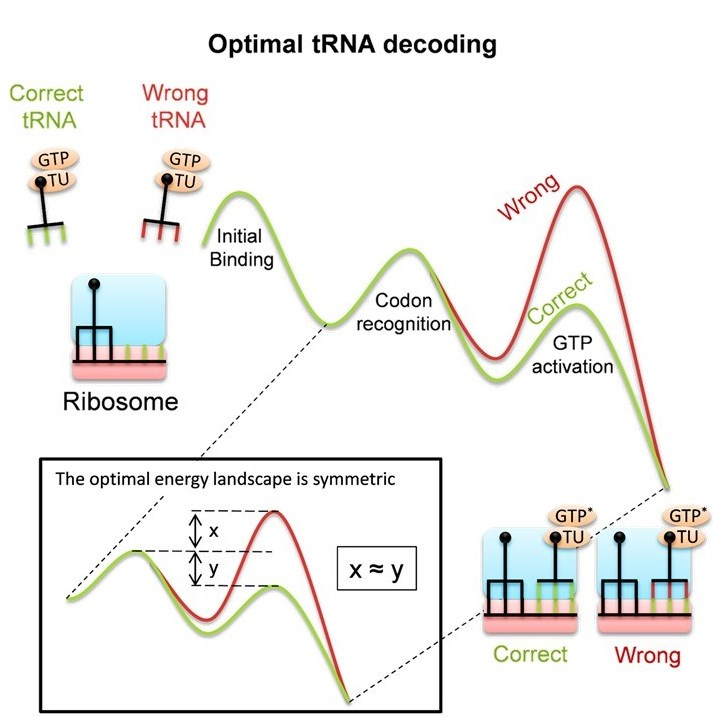
Ribosome uses conformational proofreading for tRNA decoding. main: The curves show the free energy landscape of codon recognition as suggested by experiments. In the stages that are sensitive to codon identity, the pathways of correct (green) and wrong (red) tRNAs split. The multistage kinetics include: Initial binding and codon recognition: a complex of elongation factor (EF-Tu) and aminoacyl-tRNA binds to the ribosome. Codon is recognized by pairing with the anticodon, and by additional interaction with the "decoding center" of the ribosome. As a result, correct (cognate) tRNAs are more stable than non-cognate ones. GTP activation and hydrolysis: Codon recognition leads to global conformational changes of the ribosome and tRNA, which are different for cognate or non-cognate tRNAs and affect GTP activation and hydrolysis by EF-Tu. The conformational proofreading model explains these conformational changes as a means to enhance tRNA recognition. inset: The symmetric adapted landscape implies that the ratio of forward and backward rates is inverted between the correct and wrong energy landscapes.

== In other biological systems ==
=== Human UV-damage repair ===
A 2014 study found that conformational proofreading is used by human DNA repair mechanisms. The research focused on the question of how DNA-repair proteins scan the human genome for UV-induced damage during the initial step of nucleotide excision repair (NER). Detailed single-molecule measurements revealed how the human UV-damaged DNA-binding protein (UV-DDB) performs a 3D search. The authors find that "UV-DDB examines sites on DNA in discrete steps before forming long-lived, nonmotile UV-DDB dimers (DDB1-DDB2)_{2} at sites of damage. Analysis of the rates of dissociation for the transient binding molecules on both undamaged and damaged DNA show multiple dwell times over three orders of magnitude... These intermediate states are believed to represent discrete UV-DDB conformers on the trajectory to stable damage detection." The authors conclude from their detailed kinetic measurements that UV-DDB recognizes lesions using a conformational proofreading mechanism via multiple intermediates.

== Other recognition schemes ==
=== Relation to kinetic proofreading ===
In the kinetic proofreading schema, a time delay (equivalently, an irreversible intermediate stage) is introduced during the formation of the correct or incorrect complexes. This time delay reduces the production rates of both complexes but enhances the fidelity beyond the equilibrium limit. The irreversibility of the scheme requires an energy source. The time delay in kinetic proofreading is analogous to the spatial difference in conformational proofreading. However, the conformational proofreading can be an equilibrium scheme that does not consume energy.
