= David Casasent =

American engineer and academic (1942–2015)

- Born: David Paul Casasent; December 8, 1942; Washington, D.C., U.S.
- Died: November 16, 2015 (aged 72); Pittsburgh, Pennsylvania, U.S.
- Education: University of Illinois
- Scientific career
- Fields: Electrical engineering
- Workplaces: Carnegie Mellon University
- Thesis: An on-line electro-optical video processing system (1969)
- Doctoral advisor: Wolfgang J. Poppelbaum
- Doctoral students: Demetri Psaltis
- Website: users.ece.cmu.edu/~casasent

David Paul Casasent (December 8, 1942 — November 16, 2015) was an American electrical engineer and computer scientist, who was a professor emeritus at Department of Electrical and Computer Engineering at Carnegie Mellon University. He has served as the president of SPIE in 1993 and the International Neural Network Society in 1999.

Born in Washington, D.C., Casasent received B.S., M.S. and Ph.D. degrees from University of Illinois in 1964, 1965 and 1969, respectively. He joined Carnegie Mellon University as a faculty member in 1969 and was named as the George Westinghouse Chair in 1980. His research at Carnegie Mellon University mainly concerned optics with a focus on image and optical signal processing. Retiring in 2009, he died on November 16, 2015 near Pittsburgh, Pennsylvania, and was survived by his wife and children.

Being the recipient of SPIE President's Award in 1996, Casasent was a fellow of SPIE, IEEE, and the Optical Society of America. He has previously served as the associate editor of the journal Optical Engineering.

== Selected publications ==
Books

- Casasent, David P. (1973). Electronic Circuits. New York: Quantum Publishers.
- Casasent, David P., ed. (1978). Optical Data Processing: Applications. Topics in Applied Physics. Vol. 23. Berlin, New York: Springer-Verlag. doi:10.1007/BFb0057980. ISBN 978-3-662-30844-8.
- Casasent, David P., ed. (1979). Optical Pattern Recognition. SPIE Proceedings Vol. 201. Bellingham, WA: SPIE.

Journal articles

- Casasent, David; Psaltis, Demetri (April 1976). "Scale invariant optical correlation using Mellin transforms". Optics Communications. 17 (1): 59–63. doi:10.1016/0030-4018(76)90179-6.
- Casasent, David; Psaltis, Demetri (May–June 1976). "Scale invariant optical transform". Optical Engineering. 15 (3): 258–261. doi:10.1117/12.7971962.
- Casasent, David; Psaltis, Demetri (July 1976). "Position, rotation, and scale invariant optical correlation". Applied Optics. 15 (7): 1795–1799. doi:10.1364/AO.15.001795. PMID 20165266.
- Casasent, David; Psaltis, Demetri (1977). "New optical transforms for pattern recognition". Proceedings of the IEEE. 65 (1): 77–84. doi:10.1109/PROC.1977.10432.
- Psaltis, Demetri; Casasent, David (15 January 1979). "Optical residue arithmetic: a correlation approach". Applied Optics. 18 (2): 163–171. doi:10.1364/AO.18.000163. PMID 20208681.
- Casasent, David P.; Smokelin, John-Scott; Ye, Anqi (September 1992). "Wavelet and Gabor transforms for detection". Optical Engineering. 31 (9): 1893–1898. doi:10.1117/12.59913.
- Casasent, David P.; Neiberg, Leonard M. (1995). "Classifier and shift-invariant automatic target recognition neural networks". Neural Networks. 8 (7/8): 1117–1129. doi:10.1016/0893-6080(95)00047-X.
