= Aralkylamine dehydrogenase (azurin) =

Identifiers
- EC no.: 1.4.9.2

Databases
- IntEnz: IntEnz view
- BRENDA: BRENDA entry
- ExPASy: NiceZyme view
- KEGG: KEGG entry
- MetaCyc: metabolic pathway
- PRIAM: profile
- PDB structures: RCSB PDB PDBe PDBsum
Search
- PMC: articles
- PubMed: articles
- NCBI: proteins

Aralkylamine dehydrogenase (azurin) (EC 1.4.9.2, aromatic amine dehydrogenase, arylamine dehydrogenase, tyramine dehydrogenase) is an enzyme with the systematic name aralkylamine:azurin oxidoreductase (deaminating). This enzyme catalyses the following chemical reaction:

ArCH_{2}NH_{2} + H_{2}O + 2 azurin $\rightleftharpoons$ ArCHO + NH_{3} + 2 reduced azurin

The three substrates of this enzyme are RCH_{2}NH_{2} (i.e., an aromatic amine), water, and the acceptor azurin, and its three products are RCHO, ammonia, and a reduced acceptor. Azurin can be replaced with the artificial acceptor phenazine methosulfate in in vitro studies.

This quinoprotein enzyme belongs to the family of oxidoreductases, specifically those acting on the CH-NH2 group of donors with other acceptors. This enzyme participates in tyrosine metabolism and phenylalanine metabolism. It is notable for its chemical mechanism, which is dominated by proton tunneling.
