= Coulomb drag =

Induced electric currents due to proximity between two conductors

In condensed matter physics, Coulomb drag (also called electron drag or current drag) refers a transport phenomenon between two spatially isolated electrical conductors, where passing a steady electric current through one of them induces a voltage difference in the other. It is named after the Coulomb interaction between charge carriers (usually electrons) responsible for the effect.

The effect was first predicted by Soviet physicist M. B. Pogrebinsky in 1977. The first experimental verification of the phenomena was carried between 1991 and 1992 in two-dimensional electron gases by the group of James P. Eisenstein working with gallium arsenide (GaAs) double quantum wells.

In the presence of magnetic fields it leads to analogous phenomena, like the Hall drag or the magneto-Coulomb drag. When spin-polarized currents are involved, it is termed spin Coulomb drag.

== Description ==
The phenomenon considers two spatially isolated layers. In between the two layers, there can be vacuum or an insulator. When an electric direct current is driven in the active layer, it drags carriers in the passive layer due to Coulomb interaction, this charge imbalance leads to a drag voltage V_{D} induced in the passive layer. For ballistic conduction, it is expected that the resistance is R_{D} to be proportional to the temperature squared T ^{2}. In a realistic system, the resistance dependence with temperature deviates from this regime due to the presence of phonons (low temperatures compared to the Fermi temperature T_{F}), plasmons (high temperatures of the order of T_{F}), disorder (T lnT behaviour) and magnetic fields.
