= Erik Winfree =

American computer scientist

- Born: September 26, 1969 (age 56)
- Education: University of Chicago (BS); California Institute of Technology (PhD)
- Scientific career
- Fields: Computer science Bioengineering
- Workplaces: California Institute of Technology
- Thesis: Algorithmic self-assembly of DNA (1998)
- Doctoral advisor: John J. Hopfield

Erik Winfree (born September 26, 1969) is an American applied computer scientist, bioengineer, and professor at California Institute of Technology. He is a leading researcher into DNA computing and DNA nanotechnology.

In 1998, Winfree in collaboration with Nadrian Seeman published the creation of two-dimensional lattices of DNA tiles using the "double crossover" motif. These tile-based structures provided the capability to implement DNA computing, which was demonstrated by Winfree and Paul Rothemund in 2004, and for which they shared the 2006 Feynman Prize in Nanotechnology.

In 1999, he was named to the MIT Technology Review TR100 as one of the top 100 innovators in the world under the age of 35.

He received a Bachelor of Science from the University of Chicago in 1991 and a Doctor of Philosophy from the California Institute of Technology in 1998. For his doctoral studies, he enrolled in the Computation and Neural Systems program at Caltech under advisors John Hopfield and Al Barr. He was a Lewis Thomas Postdoctoral Fellow in Molecular Biology at Princeton University. He was a 2000 MacArthur Fellow. His father Arthur Winfree, a theoretical biologist, was also a MacArthur Fellow.

== Works ==
- DNA Based Computers V: Dimacs Workshop DNA Based Computers V June 14–15, 1999 Massachusetts Institute of Technology, Editors Erik Winfree, David K. Gifford, AMS Bookstore, 2000, ISBN 978-0-8218-2053-7
- Evolution as computation: DIMACS workshop, Princeton, January 1999, Editors Laura Faye Landweber, Erik Winfree, Springer, 2002, ISBN 978-3-540-66709-4
- "DNA Computing by Self-Assembly", Ninth Annual Symposium on Frontiers of Engineering, National Academies Press, 2004, ISBN 978-0-309-09139-8
- Algorithmic Bioprocesses, Editors Anne Condon, David Harel, Joost N. Kok, Arto Salomaa, Erik Winfree, Springer, 2009, ISBN 978-3-540-88868-0
