= Trajectoid =

Shape designed to roll down some path

A trajectoid is a three-dimensional body designed to roll along a prescribed path on a plane. Unlike conventional rolling bodies, whose paths follow from their shapes, a trajectoid is constructed from the path it is meant to follow. Periodic rolling imposes a second requirement: the body must also recover its original orientation. For generic paths, a suitable scaling makes this possible after the body rolls along two periods.

A computed trajectoid after zero, one and two path periods. After one period its orientation differs by 180°; after two periods its initial orientation is restored. The white curve is the contact trace on the body. Inset: the prescribed path. Right: principal rotation angle.

== Construction ==
The construction starts with a heavy spherical core surrounded by a lightweight shell. The body can roll under gravity on an inclined plane or be rolled by hand on a horizontal plane. The outer shell is shaped so that departures from the prescribed path raise the center of mass, making the intended motion energetically favorable. Experimental trajectoids were fabricated by 3D-printing the shell in two halves, with a central spherical cavity holding a metal sphere.

Computed rolling along two periods of a prescribed path. One period produces a half-turn; two restore the initial orientation.

== Rotation and two-period return ==
The construction determines the rolling path, but repeating it also requires the return of the orientation to its original state. Let $W(\lambda)\in SO(3)$ denote the net rotation after one path period, where $\lambda$ uniformly scales the constituent rotation angles. Each repetition of the path applies the same net rotation. As $\lambda$ varies, the endpoint $W(\lambda)$ traces a curve in rotation space.

Return after one period requires $W(\lambda)=I$. In the axis–angle representation of SO(3), the identity rotation is a point at the center of a three-dimensional ball. Therefore return after one period requires hitting exactly this one point. In contrast, return after two periods requires $W(\lambda)^2=I$, which also holds whenever $W(\lambda)$ is a 180° rotation. All such half-turns lie on the ball's surface, with antipodal points identified. Thus one-period closure requires reaching a single point, whereas nontrivial two-period closure can occur anywhere on an entire surface.

Earlier numerical studies suggested that, for almost every prescribed path, a suitable scaling would allow the body to recover its orientation after two periods. A theorem published in 2025 established that, for almost every rotation sequence, a positive scale $\lambda_*$ exists for which $W(\lambda_*)$ is a half-turn. Two periods then restore the original orientation, whereas return after one period is very rare. The result extends beyond rolling bodies to general sequences of three-dimensional rotations and SU(2) operetors.

The same trajectoid motion in the axis–angle ball of SO(3), at the selected scale λ_{*}. The first period runs from the identity I to A; the second continues from the antipodal representative A′ and returns to I. The points A and A′ represent the same 180° rotation. Right: principal rotation angle.
