= Shih-Chii Liu =

Engineering professor

Shih-Chii Liu is a professor at the University of Zürich. Her research interests include developing brain-inspired sensors, algorithms, and networks; and their neural electronic equivalents.

== Education and career ==
Liu pursued a Bachelor's degree in electrical engineering at the Massachusetts Institute of Technology and received her Ph.D. in 1997 from the Department of Computation and Neural Systems at California Institute of Technology. A year later she joined the Sensors Group at the Institute of Neuroinformatics. A year later, she joined the Institute of Neuroinformatics, University of Zürich and ETH Zürich as a group leader, and became a professor at the University of Zurich in 2020. She co-directs the Sensors Group at the Institute of Neuroinformatics. She is also affiliated with the Neuroscience Center Zurich.

== Recognition ==
Liu is a past chair of the IEEE CAS Neural Systems and Applications, and IEEE Sensory Systems Technical Committees. She is the current chair of the IEEE CAS/ED Swiss Chapter, and is an associate editor for the Neural Networks Journal, and past editor for the IEEE Transactions on Biomedical Circuits and Systems, among others. Liu has been involved in the Telluride Neuromorphic Cognition Engineering Workshop in various roles for most of the last two decades and most recently as the lead organizer.

== Publications ==
Liu is the lead author of two textbooks on Neuromorphic engineering: Analog VLSI: Circuits and Principles (MIT Press, 2002) and Event‐Based Neuromorphic Systems (John Wiley & Sons, Ltd, 2015).
