= Enzyme catalysis =

Catalysis of chemical reactions by enzymes

Visualization of ubiquitylation

Enzyme catalysis is the increase in the rate of a process by an enzyme. Most enzymes are proteins, and most such processes are chemical reactions. Within the enzyme, generally catalysis occurs at a localized site, called the active site.

Most enzymes are made predominantly of proteins, either a single protein chain or many such chains in a multi-subunit complex. Enzymes often also incorporate non-protein components, such as metal ions or specialized organic molecules known as cofactor (e.g. adenosine triphosphate). Many cofactors are vitamins, and their role as vitamins is directly linked to their use in the catalysis of biological process within metabolism. Catalysis of biochemical reactions in the cell is vital since many but not all metabolically essential reactions have very low rates when uncatalysed. One driver of protein evolution is the optimization of such catalytic activities, although only the most crucial enzymes operate near catalytic efficiency limits, and many enzymes are far from optimal. Important factors in enzyme catalysis include general acid and base catalysis, orbital steering, entropic restriction, orientation effects (i.e. lock and key catalysis), as well as motional effects involving protein dynamics

Mechanisms of enzyme catalysis vary, but are all similar in principle to other types of chemical catalysis in that the crucial factor is a reduction of energy barrier(s) separating the reactants (or substrates) from the products. The reduction of activation energy (E_{a}) increases the fraction of reactant molecules that can overcome this barrier and form the product. An important principle is that since they only reduce energy barriers between products and reactants, enzymes always catalyze reactions in both directions, and cannot drive a reaction forward or affect the equilibrium position – only the speed with which is it achieved. As with other catalysts, the enzyme is not consumed or changed by the reaction (as a substrate is) but is recycled such that a single enzyme performs many rounds of catalysis.

Enzymes are often highly specific, i.e. they only act on particular substrates, sometimes only one. Others show group specificity and can act on similar but not identical chemical groups such as peptide bonds. Many enzymes have stereochemical specificity and act on one stereoisomer but not another.

== Induced fit ==
Enzyme changes shape by induced fit upon substrate binding to form enzyme-substrate complex. Hexokinase has a large induced fit motion that closes over the substrates adenosine triphosphate and xylose. Binding sites in blue, substrates in black and Mg^{2+} cofactor in yellow. (PDB: 2E2N, 2E2Q)

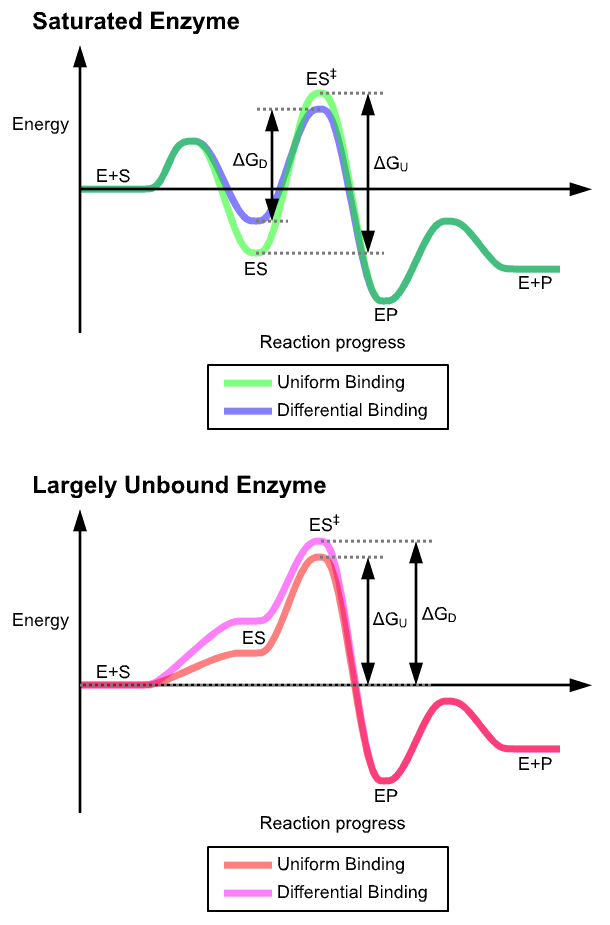
Some reaction coordinates for substrate binding

The classic model for the enzyme-substrate interaction is the induced fit model. This model proposes that the initial interaction between enzyme and substrate is relatively weak, but that these weak interactions rapidly induce conformational changes in the enzyme that strengthen binding.

The advantages of the induced fit mechanism arise due to the stabilizing effect of strong enzyme binding. There are two mechanisms of substrate binding: uniform binding, which has strong substrate binding, and differential binding, which has strong transition state binding. The stabilizing effect of uniform binding increases both substrate and transition state binding affinity, while differential binding increases only transition state binding affinity. Both are used by enzymes and have been evolutionarily chosen to minimize the activation energy of the reaction. Enzymes that are saturated, that is, have a high affinity substrate binding, require differential binding to reduce the energy of activation, whereas small substrate unbound enzymes may use either differential or uniform binding.

These effects have led to most proteins using the differential binding mechanism to reduce the energy of activation, so most substrates have high affinity for the enzyme while in the transition state. Differential binding is carried out by the induced fit mechanism – the substrate first binds weakly, then the enzyme changes conformation increasing the affinity to the transition state and stabilizing it, so reducing the activation energy to reach it.

The induced fit concept cannot be used to rationalize catalysis. That is, the chemical catalysis is defined as the reduction of E_{a}^{‡} (when the system is already in the ES^{‡}) relative to E_{a}^{‡} in the uncatalyzed reaction in water (without the enzyme). The induced fit only suggests that the barrier is lower in the closed form of the enzyme but does not tell us what the reason for the barrier reduction is.

Induced fit may be beneficial to the fidelity of molecular recognition in the presence of competition and noise via the conformational proofreading mechanism. However, the role of induced fit in controlling replication fidelity has been questioned and remains poorly defined. Experimental and theoretical analyses have suggested that induced fit alone does not provide a sufficient explanation for high replication fidelity.

== Mechanisms of an alternative reaction route ==
These conformational changes also bring catalytic residues in the active site close to the chemical bonds in the substrate that will be altered in the reaction. After binding takes place, one or more mechanisms of catalysis lowers the energy of the reaction's transition state, by providing an alternative chemical pathway for the reaction. There are six possible mechanisms of "over the barrier" catalysis as well as a "through the barrier" mechanism:

=== Proximity and orientation ===
Enzyme-substrate interactions align the reactive chemical groups and hold them close together in an optimal geometry, which increases the rate of the reaction. This reduces the entropy of the reactants and thus makes addition or transfer reactions less unfavorable, since a reduction in the overall entropy when two reactants become a single product. However this is a general effect and is seen in non-addition or transfer reactions where it occurs due to an increase in the "effective concentration" of the reagents. This is understood when considering how increases in concentration leads to increases in reaction rate: essentially when the reactants are more concentrated, they collide more often and so react more often. In enzyme catalysis, the binding of the reagents to the enzyme restricts the conformational space of the reactants, holding them in the 'proper orientation' and close to each other, so that they collide more frequently, of an with the correct geometry, to facilitate the desired reaction. The "effective concentration" is the concentration the reactant would have to be, free in solution, to experiences the same collisional frequency. Often such theoretical effective concentrations are unphysical and impossible to realize in reality – which is a testament to the great catalytic power of many enzymes, with massive rate increases over the uncatalyzed state.

For example:
Similar reactions will occur far faster if the reaction is intramolecular.
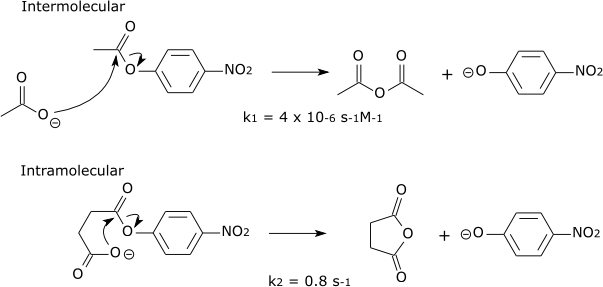
The effective concentration of acetate in the intramolecular reaction can be estimated as k_{2}/k_{1} = 2 × 10^{5} Molar.

However, the situation might be more complex, since modern computational studies have established that traditional examples of proximity effects cannot be related directly to enzyme entropic effects. Also, the original entropic proposal has been found to largely overestimate the contribution of orientation entropy to catalysis.

=== Proton donors or acceptors ===
Proton donors and acceptors, i.e. acids and base may donate and accept protons in order to stabilize developing charges in the transition state. This is related to the overall principle of catalysis, that of reducing energy barriers, since in general transition states are high energy states, and by stabilizing them this high energy is reduced, lowering the barrier. A key feature of enzyme catalysis over many non-biological catalysis, is that both acid and base catalysis can be combined in the same reaction. In many abiotic systems, acids (large [H+]) or bases ( large concentration H+ sinks, or species with electron pairs) can increase the rate of the reaction; but of course the environment can only have one overall pH (measure of acidity or basicity (alkalinity)). However, since enzymes are large molecules, they can position both acid groups and basic groups in their active site to interact with their substrates, and employ both modes independent of the bulk pH.

Often general acid or base catalysis is employed to activate nucleophile and/or electrophile groups, or to stabilize leaving groups. Many amino acids with acidic or basic groups are this employed in the active site, such as the glutamic and aspartic acid, histidine, cystine, tyrosine, lysine and arginine, as well as serine and threonine. In addition, the peptide backbone, with carbonyl and amide N groups is often employed. Cystine and Histidine are very commonly involved, since they both have a pKa close to neutral pH and can therefore both accept and donate protons.

Many reaction mechanisms involving acid/base catalysis assume a substantially altered pKa. This alteration of pKa is possible through the local environment of the residue.

Conditions	Acids	Bases
Hydrophobic environment	Increase pKa	Decrease pKa
Adjacent residues of like charge	Increase pKa	Decrease pKa
Salt bridge (and hydrogen bond) formation	Decrease pKa	Increase pKa

pKa can also be influenced significantly by the surrounding environment, to the extent that residues which are basic in solution may act as proton donors, and vice versa.

For example:
Catalytic triad of a serine protease
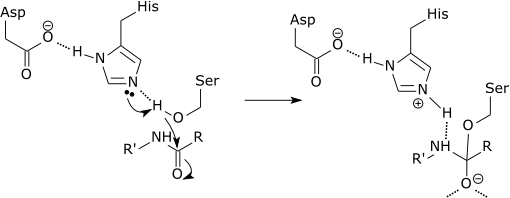
The initial step of the serine protease catalytic mechanism involves the histidine of the active site accepting a proton from the serine residue. This prepares the serine as a nucleophile to attack the amide bond of the substrate. This mechanism includes donation of a proton from serine (a base, pKa 14) to histidine (an acid, pKa 6), made possible due to the local environment of the bases.

The modification of the pKa's is a pure part of the electrostatic mechanism. The catalytic effect of the above example is mainly associated with the reduction of the pKa of the oxyanion and the increase in the pKa of the histidine, while the proton transfer from the serine to the histidine is not catalyzed significantly since it is not the rate determining barrier. Note that in the example shown, the histidine conjugate acid acts as a general acid catalyst for the subsequent loss of the amine from a tetrahedral intermediate. Evidence supporting this proposed mechanism (Figure 4 in Ref. 13) has, however, been controverted.

=== Electrostatic catalysis ===
Stabilization of charged transition states can also be by residues in the active site forming ionic bonds (or partial ionic charge interactions) with the intermediate. These bonds can either come from acidic or basic side chains found on amino acids such as lysine, arginine, aspartic acid or glutamic acid or come from metal cofactors such as zinc. Metal ions are particularly effective and can reduce the pKa of water enough to make it an effective nucleophile.

Systematic computer simulation studies have established that electrostatic effects give, by far, the largest contribution to catalysis, and can increase the rate of reaction by a factor of up to 10^{7}. In particular, it has been found that enzymes provide an environment which is more polar than water, and that ionic transition states are stabilized by fixed dipoles. This is very different from transition state stabilization in water, where the water molecules must pay with "reorganization energy" in order to stabilize ionic and charged states. Thus, catalysis is associated with the fact that the enzyme polar groups are preorganized.

The magnitude of the electrostatic field exerted by an enzyme's active site has been shown to be highly correlated with the enzyme's catalytic rate enhancement.

Binding of substrate usually excludes water from the active site, thereby lowering the local dielectric constant to that of an organic solvent. This strengthens the electrostatic interactions between the charged/polar substrates and the active sites. In addition, studies have shown that the charge distributions about the active sites are arranged so as to stabilize the transition states of the catalyzed reactions. In several enzymes, these charge distributions apparently serve to guide polar substrates toward their binding sites so that the rates of these enzymatic reactions are greater than their apparent diffusion-controlled limits.

Describing the dielectric constant in the enzyme–substrate complex as a single, low macroscopic value represents a significant oversimplification. In practice, the effective macroscopic dielectric constant of proteins can be relatively high (see, for example,). What is most relevant is that enzyme active sites are highly polar environments, in which polar groups are preorganized to stabilize the transition state.

For example:
Carboxypeptidase catalytic mechanism
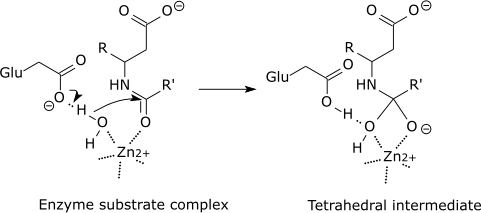
The tetrahedral intermediate is stabilised by a partial ionic bond between the Zn^{2+} ion and the negative charge on the oxygen.

=== Covalent catalysis ===
Covalent catalysis involves the substrate forming a transient covalent bond with residues in the enzyme active site or with a cofactor. This adds an additional covalent intermediate to the reaction, and helps to reduce the energy of later transition states of the reaction. The covalent bond must, at a later stage in the reaction, be broken to regenerate the enzyme. This mechanism is utilised by the catalytic triad of enzymes such as proteases like chymotrypsin and trypsin, where an acyl-enzyme intermediate is formed. An alternative mechanism is schiff base formation using the free amine from a lysine residue, as seen in the enzyme aldolase during glycolysis.

Some enzymes utilize non-amino acid cofactors such as pyridoxal phosphate (PLP) or thiamine pyrophosphate (TPP) to form covalent intermediates with reactant molecules. Such covalent intermediates function to reduce the energy of later transition states, similar to how covalent intermediates formed with active site amino acid residues allow stabilization, but the capabilities of cofactors allow enzymes to carryout reactions that amino acid side residues alone could not. Enzymes utilizing such cofactors include the PLP-dependent enzyme aspartate transaminase and the TPP-dependent enzyme pyruvate dehydrogenase.

Rather than lowering the activation energy for a reaction pathway, covalent catalysis provides an alternative pathway for the reaction (via to the covalent intermediate) and so is distinct from true catalysis. For example, the energetics of the covalent bond to the serine molecule in chymotrypsin should be compared to the well-understood covalent bond to the nucleophile in the uncatalyzed solution reaction. A true proposal of a covalent catalysis (where the barrier is lower than the corresponding barrier in solution) would require, for example, a partial covalent bond to the transition state by an enzyme group (e.g., a very strong hydrogen bond), and such effects do not contribute significantly to catalysis.

=== Metal ion catalysis ===
A metal ion in the active site participates in catalysis by coordinating charge stabilization and shielding. Because of a metal's positive charge, only negative charges can be stabilized through metal ions. However, metal ions are advantageous in biological catalysis because they are not affected by changes in pH. Metal ions can also act to ionize water by acting as a Lewis acid. Metal ions may also be agents of oxidation and reduction.

=== Bond strain ===
This is the principal effect of induced fit binding, where the affinity of the enzyme to the transition state is greater than to the substrate itself. This induces structural rearrangements which strain substrate bonds into a position closer to the conformation of the transition state, so lowering the energy difference between the substrate and transition state and helping catalyze the reaction.

However, the strain effect is, in fact, a ground state destabilization effect, rather than transition state stabilization effect. Furthermore, enzymes are very flexible and they cannot apply large strain effect.

In addition to bond strain in the substrate, bond strain may also be induced within the enzyme itself to activate residues in the active site.

For example:
Substrate, bound substrate, and transition state conformations of lysozyme.
The substrate, on binding, is distorted from the half chair conformation of the hexose ring (because of the steric hindrance with amino acids of the protein forcing the equatorial c6 to be in the axial position) into the chair conformation, which is similar in shape to the transition state.

=== Quantum tunneling ===
These traditional "over the barrier" mechanisms have been challenged in some cases by models and observations of "through the barrier" mechanisms (quantum tunneling). Some enzymes operate with kinetics which are faster than what would be predicted by the classical ΔG^{‡}. In "through the barrier" models, a proton or an electron can tunnel through activation barriers. Quantum tunneling for protons has been observed in tryptamine oxidation by aromatic amine dehydrogenase.

Quantum tunneling does not appear to provide a major catalytic advantage, since the tunneling contributions are similar in the catalyzed and the uncatalyzed reactions in solution. However, the tunneling contribution (typically enhancing rate constants by a factor of ~1000 compared to the rate of reaction for the classical 'over the barrier' route) is likely crucial to the viability of biological organisms. This emphasizes the general importance of tunneling reactions in biology. However, as stated above, this does not represent a true catalytic effect, since the same enhancement exists in the corresponding reference reaction in solution.

In 1971-1972 the first quantum-mechanical model of enzyme catalysis was formulated. However, this study did not include any representation of the enzyme environment, nor did it provide a relevant potential energy surface. Consequently, it cannot be considered a true quantum mechanical study of enzyme catalysis. Such investigations became feasible only with the development of combined quantum mechanical/molecular mechanical (QM/MM) methods.

=== Active enzyme ===
The binding energy of the enzyme-substrate complex cannot be considered as an external energy which is necessary for the substrate activation. The enzyme of high energy content may firstly transfer some specific energetic group X_{1} from catalytic site of the enzyme to the final place of the first bound reactant, then another group X_{2} from the second bound reactant (or from the second group of the single reactant) must be transferred to active site to finish substrate conversion to product and enzyme regeneration.

We can present the whole enzymatic reaction as a two coupling reactions:

S_{1} + EX_{1} → S_{1}EX_{1} → P_{1} + EP_{2}	1

S_{2} + EP_{2} → S_{2}EP_{2} → P_{2} + EX_{2}	2

It may be seen from reaction (1) that the group X_{1} of the active enzyme appears in the product due to possibility of the exchange reaction inside enzyme to avoid both electrostatic inhibition and repulsion of atoms. So we represent the active enzyme as a powerful reactant of the enzymatic reaction. The reaction (2) shows incomplete conversion of the substrate because its group X_{2} remains inside enzyme. This approach as idea had formerly proposed relying on the hypothetical extremely high enzymatic conversions (catalytically perfect enzyme).

The crucial point for the verification of the present approach is that the catalyst must be a complex of the enzyme with the transfer group of the reaction. This chemical aspect is supported by the well-studied mechanisms of the several enzymatic reactions. Consider the reaction of peptide bond hydrolysis catalyzed by a pure protein α-chymotrypsin (an enzyme acting without a cofactor), which is a well-studied member of the serine proteases family, see.

We present the experimental results for this reaction as two chemical steps:

S_{1} + EH → P_{1} + EP_{2}	3

EP_{2} + H−O−H → EH + P_{2}	4

where S_{1} is a polypeptide, P_{1} and P_{2} are products. The first chemical step (3) includes the formation of a covalent acyl-enzyme intermediate. The second step (4) is the deacylation step. The group H+, initially found on the enzyme, but not in water, appears in the product before the step of hydrolysis, therefore it may be considered as an additional group of the enzymatic reaction.

Thus, the reaction (3) shows that the enzyme acts as a powerful reactant of the reaction. According to the proposed concept, the H transport from the enzyme promotes the first reactant conversion, breakdown of the first initial chemical bond (between groups P_{1} and P_{2}). The step of hydrolysis leads to a breakdown of the second chemical bond and regeneration of the enzyme.

The proposed chemical mechanism does not depend on the concentration of the substrates or products in the medium. However, a shift in their concentration mainly causes free energy changes in the first and final steps of the reactions (1) and (2) due to the changes in the free energy content of every molecule, whether S or P, in water solution. This approach is in accordance with the following mechanism of muscle contraction. The final step of ATP hydrolysis in skeletal muscle is the product release caused by the association of myosin heads with actin. The closing of the actin-binding cleft during the association reaction is structurally coupled with the opening of the nucleotide-binding pocket on the myosin active site.

Notably, the final steps of ATP hydrolysis include the fast release of phosphate and the slow release of ADP. The release of a phosphate anion from bound ADP anion into water solution may be considered as an exergonic reaction because the phosphate anion has low molecular mass.

Thus, we arrive at the conclusion that the primary release of the inorganic phosphate H_{2}PO_{4}^{−} leads to transformation of a significant part of the free energy of ATP hydrolysis into the kinetic energy of the solvated phosphate, producing active streaming. This assumption of a local mechano-chemical transduction is in accord with Tirosh's mechanism of muscle contraction, where the muscle force derives from an integrated action of active streaming created by ATP hydrolysis.

== Examples of catalytic mechanisms ==
In reality, most enzyme mechanisms involve a combination of several different types of catalysis.

=== Triose phosphate isomerase ===
Triose phosphate isomerase (EC 5.3.1.1) catalyses the reversible interconversion of the two triose phosphates isomers dihydroxyacetone phosphate and D-glyceraldehyde 3-phosphate.

=== Trypsin ===
Trypsin (EC 3.4.21.4) is a serine protease that cleaves protein substrates after lysine or arginine residues using a catalytic triad to perform covalent catalysis, and an oxyanion hole to stabilise charge-buildup on the transition states.

=== Aldolase ===
Aldolase (EC 4.1.2.13) catalyses the breakdown of fructose 1,6-bisphosphate (F-1,6-BP) into glyceraldehyde 3-phosphate and dihydroxyacetone phosphate (DHAP).

== Enzyme diffusivity ==
The advent of single-molecule studies in the 2010s led to the observation that the movement of untethered enzymes increases with increasing substrate concentration and increasing reaction enthalpy. Subsequent observations suggest that this increase in diffusivity is driven by transient displacement of the enzyme's center of mass, resulting in a "recoil effect that propels the enzyme".

== Reaction similarity ==
Similarity between enzymatic reactions (EC) can be calculated by using bond changes, reaction centres or substructure metrics (EC-BLAST).

== See also ==
- Catalytic triad
- Enzyme assay
- Enzyme inhibitor
- Enzyme kinetics
- Enzyme promiscuity
- Protein dynamics
- Pseudoenzymes, whose ubiquity despite their catalytic inactivity suggests omic implications
- Quantum tunnelling
- The Proteolysis Map
- Time resolved crystallography
