= Women in chemistry =

Female contributors to the field of chemistry

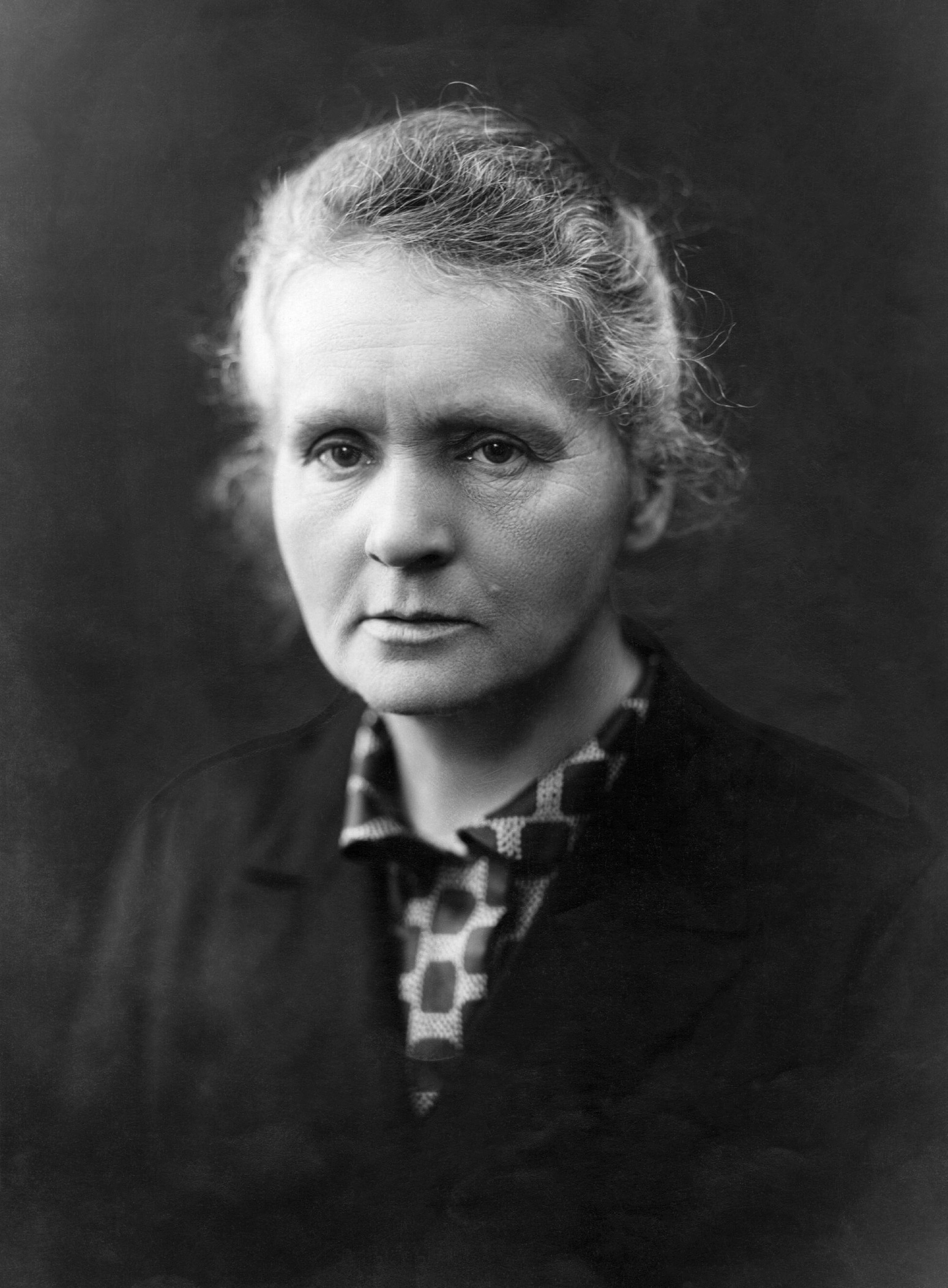
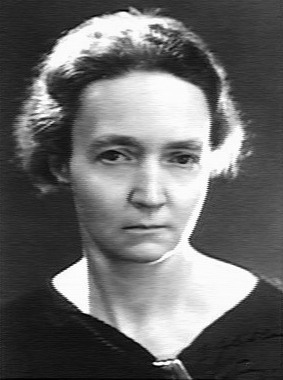
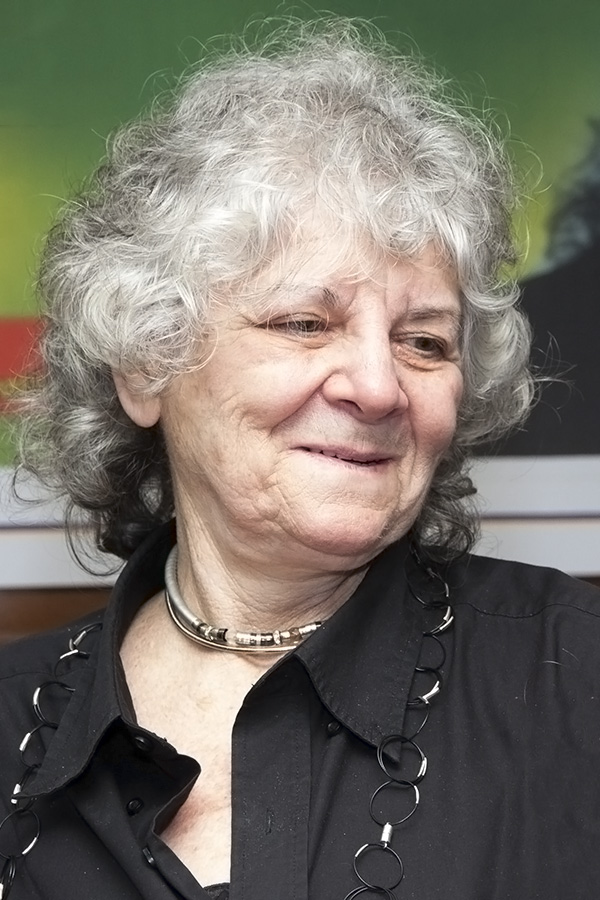
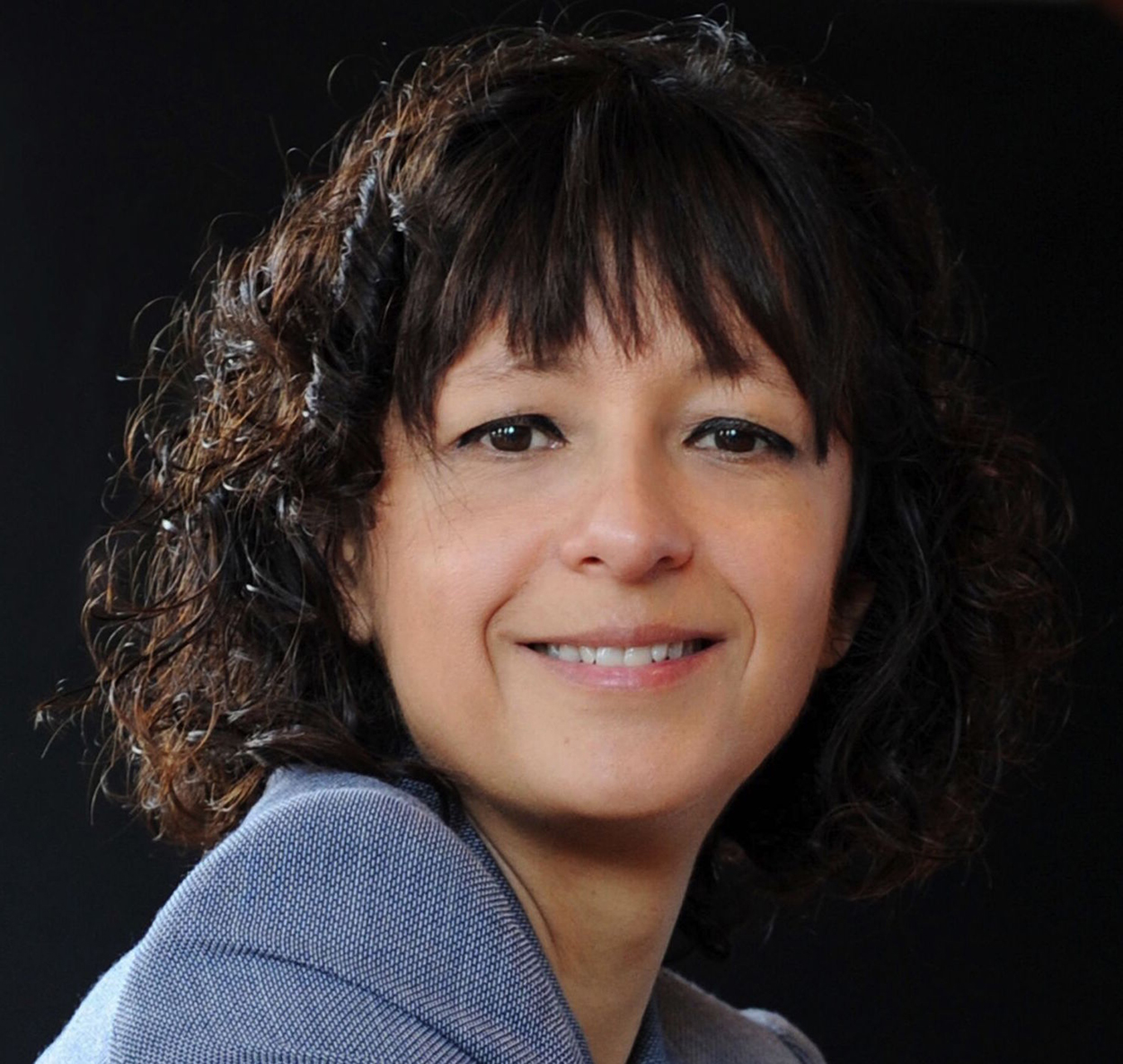
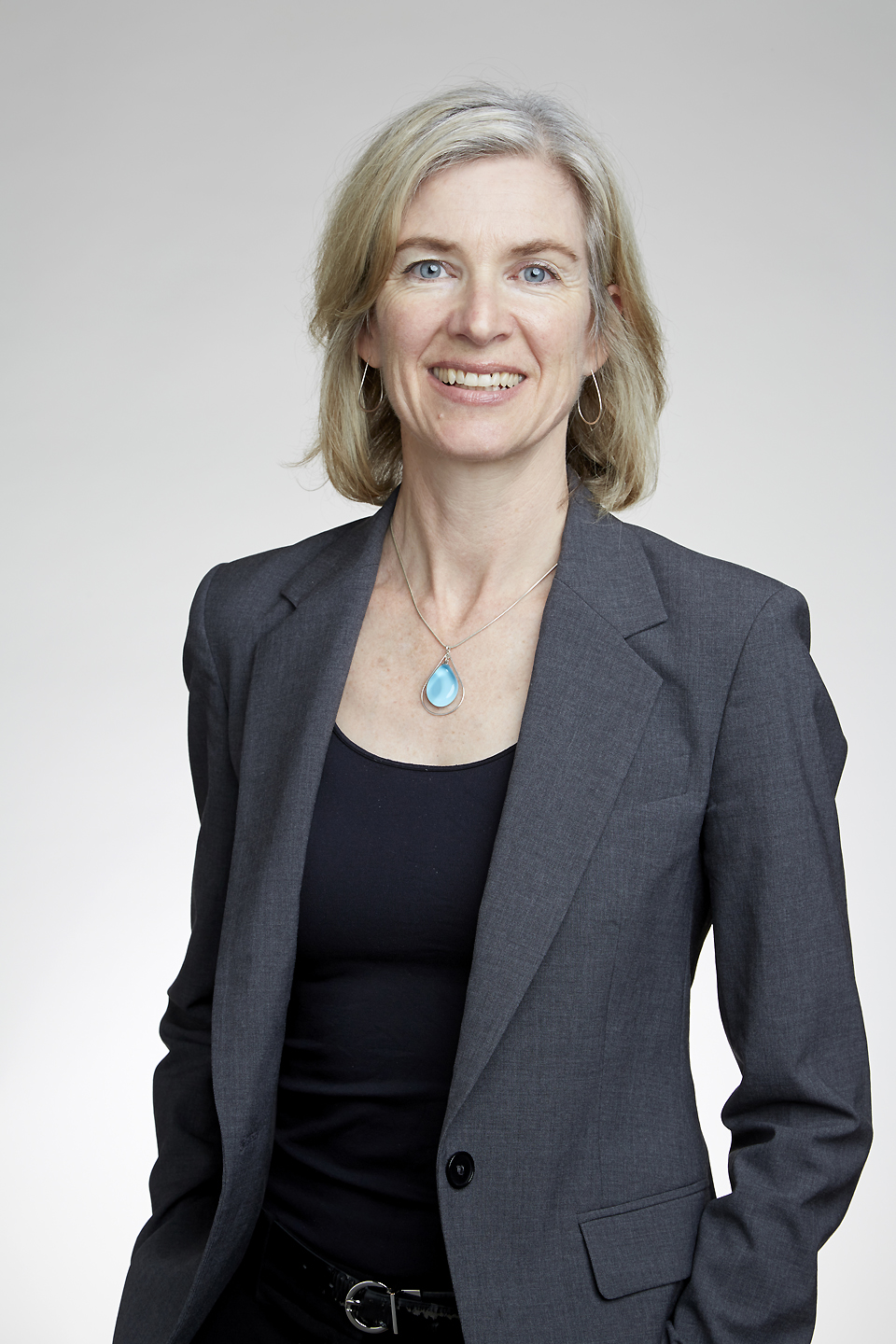
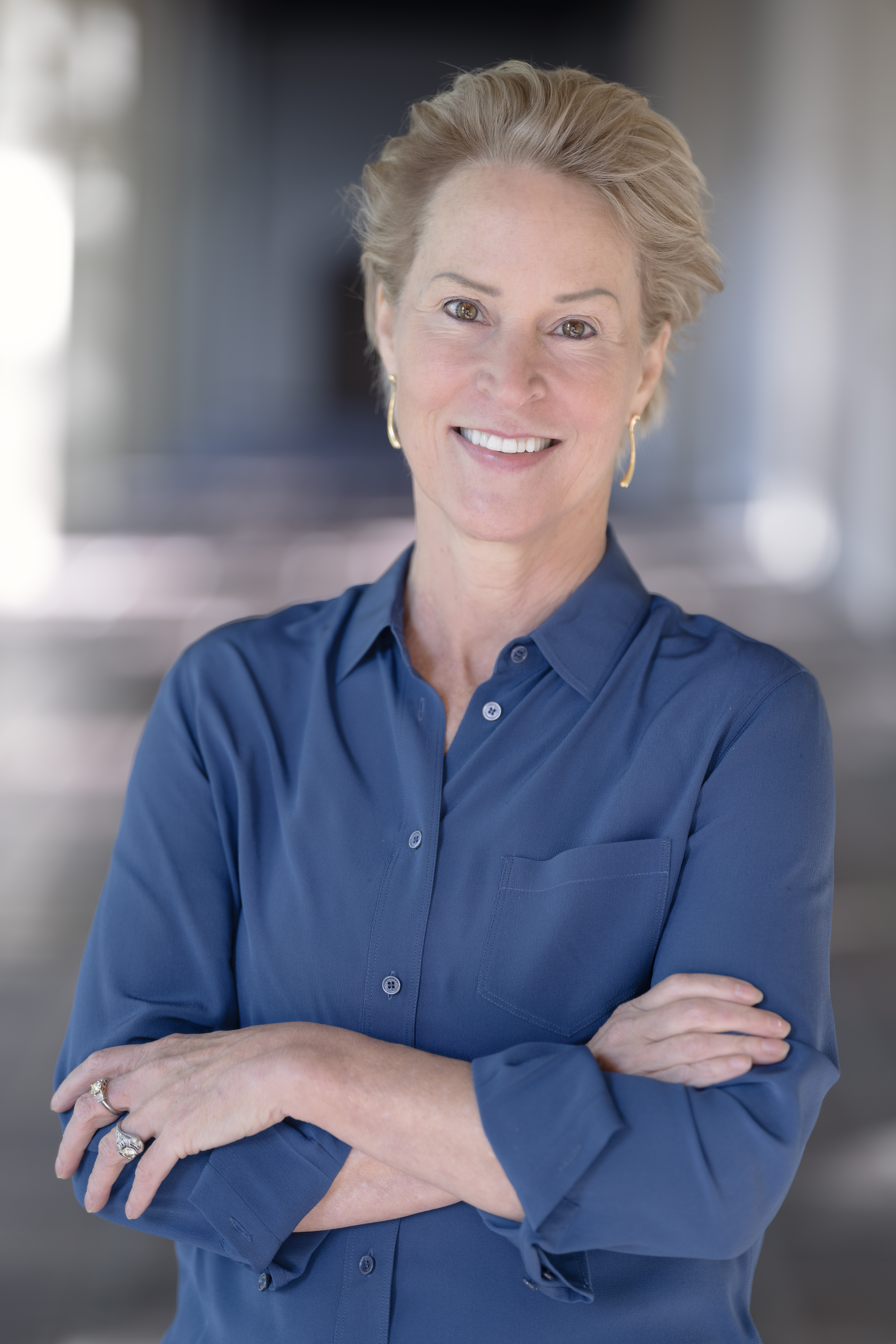
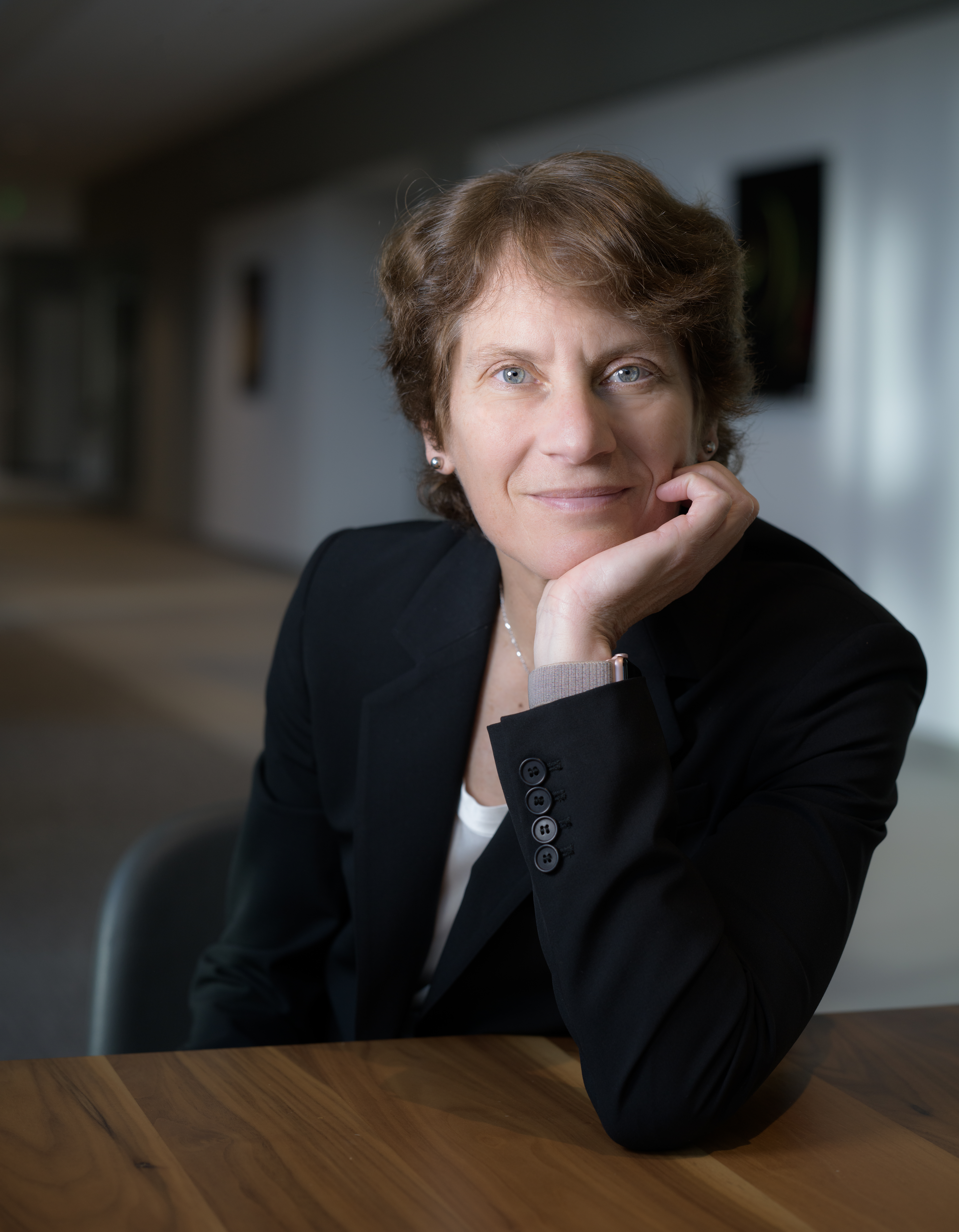
Nobel Laureates
Marie Curie – Irène Joliot-Curie
Dorothy Hodgkin–Ada Yonath
Emmanuelle Charpentier – Jennifer Doudna
Frances Arnold–Carolyn Bertozzi

This is a list of women chemists. It should include those who have been important to the development or practice of chemistry. Their research or application has made significant contributions in the area of basic or applied chemistry.

== Nobel laureates ==
- 1911 – Marie Sklodowska-Curie – discovery of radium & polonium
- 1935 – Irène Joliot-Curie – artificial radioactivity
- 1964 – Dorothy Crowfoot Hodgkin – protein crystallography
- 2009 – Ada E. Yonath – structure & function of the ribosome
- 2018 – Frances Arnold – directed evolution to engineer enzymes
- 2020 – Emmanuelle Charpentier and Jennifer Doudna – for CRISPR gene editing
- 2022 - Carolyn R. Bertozzi - for bioorthogonal chemistry

Eight women have won the Nobel Prize in Chemistry (listed above), awarded annually since 1901 by the Royal Swedish Academy of Sciences. Marie Curie was the first woman to receive the prize in 1911, which was her second Nobel Prize (she also won the prize in physics in 1903, along with Pierre Curie and Henri Becquerel – making her the only woman to be award two Nobel prizes). Her prize in chemistry was for her "discovery of the elements radium and polonium, by the isolation of radium and the study of the nature and compounds of this remarkable element." Irene Joliot-Curie, Marie's daughter, became the second woman to be awarded this prize in 1935 for her discovery of artificial radioactivity. Dorothy Hodgkin won the prize in 1964 for the development of protein crystallography. Among her significant discoveries are the structures of penicillin and vitamin B12. Forty five years later, Ada Yonath shared the prize with Venkatraman Ramakrishnan and Thomas A. Steitz for the study of the structure and function of the ribosome. Emmanuelle Charpentier and Jennifer A Doudna won the 2020 prize in chemistry “for the development of a method for genome editing.” Charpentier and Doudna are the first women to share the Nobel Prize in chemistry.

== Wolf laureates ==
Three women have been awarded the Wolf Prize in Chemistry, they are:

- 2006 – Ada Yonath "for ingenious structural discoveries of the ribosomal machinery of peptide-bond formation and the light-driven primary processes in photosynthesis.
- 2022 – Bonnie L. Bassler and Carolyn R. Bertozzi "for their seminal contributions to understanding the chemistry of cellular communication and inventing chemical methodologies to study the role of carbohydrates, lipids, and proteins in such biological processes."

== Chemical elements ==
In the periodic table of elements, two chemical elements are named after a female scientist:

- Curium (element 96), named after Marie and Pierre Curie
- Meitnerium (element 109), named after Lise Meitner

== List of women chemists ==
The following list is split into the centuries when the majority of the scientist's work was performed. The scientist's listed may be born and perform work outside of the century they are listed under.

=== 19th century ===
- Mary Watson (1856–1933), one of the first two female chemistry students at the University of Oxford
- Margaret Seward (1864–1929), one of the first two female chemistry students at the University of Oxford; signed the 1904 petition to the Chemical Society
- Vera Bogdanovskaia (1868–1897), one of the first female Russian chemists
- Martina Casiano y Mayor (1881–1958), first female member of the Spanish Society of Physics and Chemistry
- Gerty Cori (1896–1957) Jewish Czech-American biochemist who was the first American to win a Nobel Prize in science
- Margot Dorenfeldt (1895–1986) First woman to graduate from Norwegian Institute of Technology (1919)
- Ida Freund (1863–1914), first woman to be a university chemistry lecturer in the United Kingdom
- Ellen Gleditsch (1879–1968), Norwegian radiochemist; Norway's second female professor
- Louise Hammarström (1849–1917), Swedish mineral chemist, first formally educated female Swedish chemist
- Edith Humphrey (1875–1978), Inorganic chemist, probably the first British woman to gain a doctorate in chemistry
- Julia Lermontova (1846–1919), Russian chemist, first Russian female doctorate in chemistry
- Laura Linton (1853–1915), American chemist, teacher, and physician
- Rachel Lloyd (1839–1900), First American female to earn a doctorate in chemistry, first regularly admitted female member of the American Chemical Society, studied sugar beets
- Muriel Wheldale Onslow (1880–1932), British biochemist
- Marie Pasteur (1826–1910), French chemist and bacteriologist
- Mary Engle Pennington (1872–1952), American chemist
- Agnes Pockels (1862–1935), German chemist
- Anna Sundström (1785–1871), Swedish chemist
- Clara Immerwahr (1870–1915), First woman to get her doctorate in chemistry in Germany
- Ellen Swallow Richards (1842–1911), American industrial and environmental chemist
- Anna Volkova (1800–1876), Russian chemist
- Nadezhda Olimpievna Ziber-Shumova (died 1914), Russian chemist
- Fanny Rysan Mulford Hitchcock (1851–1936), one of thirteen (American) women to graduate with a degree in chemistry in the 1800s, and the first to graduate with a doctorate in philosophy of chemistry. Her areas of focus were in entomology, fish osteology, and plant pathology.

=== 20th century ===
- Elly Agallidis (1914–2006), Greek physical chemist
- Nancy Allbritton, American analytical and biochemist
- Marianne Angermann (1904-1977), German-Spanish-New Zealand biochemist
- Valerie Ashby, American chemist
- Barbara Askins (born 1939), American chemist
- Kim K. Baldridge, American computational chemist
- Alice Ball (1892–1916), American chemist
- Carolyn Bertozzi (born 1966), American biochemist
- Cynthia Burrows, American physical organic chemist
- Asima Chatterjee (1917–2006), Indian organic chemist
- Ecaterina Ciorănescu-Nenițescu (1909–2000), Romanian chemist
- Astrid Cleve (1875–1968), Swedish chemist
- Mildred Cohn (1913–2009), American chemist
- Janine Cossy (born 1950), French organic chemist
- Maria Skłodowska-Curie (1867–1934), Polish-French physicist and chemist (discoverer of polonium and radium, pioneer in radiology); Nobel laureate in physics 1903, and in chemistry 1911
- Jillian Lee Dempsey (born 1983), American chemist
- Vy M. Dong, American organic chemist
- Abigail Doyle (born 1980), American organic chemist
- Odile Eisenstein (born 1949), French, theoretical chemist
- Gertrude B. Elion (1918–1999), American biochemist (Nobel prize in Physiology or Medicine 1988 for drug development)
- Margaret Faul, Irish/American organic chemist
- Mary Peters Fieser (1909–1997), American organic chemist
- Marye Anne Fox (1947–2021), American physical organic chemist
- Rosalind Franklin (1920–1957), British physical chemist and crystallographer
- Helen Murray Free (1923–2021), American chemist
- Gunda I. Georg, German-trained medicinal chemist, professor of medicinal chemistry in the US
- Ellen Gleditsch (1879–1968), Norwegian radiochemist
- Paula T. Hammond (1963-), American chemical engineer, MIT professor
- Anna J. Harrison (1912–1998), American organic chemist
- Remziye Hisar (1902–1992), Turkish chemist, first woman chemist of Turkey
- Darleane C. Hoffman (1926–2025), American Nuclear chemist
- Icie Hoobler (1892–1984), American biochemist
- Dorothy Crowfoot Hodgkin (1910–1994), British crystallographer, Nobel prize in chemistry 1964
- Donna M. Huryn, American organic chemist
- Clara Immerwahr (1870–1915), German chemist
- Allene Rosalind Jeanes (1906–1995), American organic chemist
- Malika Jeffries-EL, American organic chemist
- Irène Joliot-Curie (1897–1956), French chemist and nuclear physicist, Nobel Prize in Chemistry 1935
- Madeleine M. Joullié (born 1927), Brazilian, American organic chemist
- Isabella Karle (1921–2017), American crystallographer
- Joyce Jacobson Kaufman (1929–2016), American chemist, Pharmacologist
- Judith Klinman (born 1941), American biochemist
- Teresa Kowalska (1946-2023), Polish chemist, co-founder of Acta Chromatographia
- Marisa Kozlowski, American organic chemist
- Stephanie Kwolek (1923–2014), American chemist, inventor of Kevlar
- Sine Larsen (1943–2025), Danish structural chemist and crystallographer
- Kathleen Lonsdale (1903–1971), British crystallographer
- Yvonne Connolly Martin (born 1936), American physical biochemist working on cheminformatics and computer-aided drug design in the US
- Marie Marynard Daly (1921–2001), First African American woman to earn her PhD in the United States
- Cynthia A. Maryanoff (born 1949), American organic/medicinal chemist
- Maud Menten (1879–1960), Canadian biochemist
- Helen Vaughn Michel (born 1932), American nuclear chemist
- Alexandra Navrotsky (born 1943), American geochemist
- Dorothy Virginia Nightingale (1902–2000), American organic chemist
- Yolanda Ortiz (chemist) (1924–2019), Argentine chemist, environmentalist
- Kathlyn Parker, American organic chemist
- Emma Parmee, British-born medicinal/organic chemist
- Marguerite Perey (1909–1975), French physicist, student of Marie Curie, discovered the element francium in 1939
- Mary Engle Pennington (1872–1952), American food chemist
- Eva Philbin (1914–2005), Irish chemist
- Iphigenia Photaki (1921–1983), Greek organic chemist
- Darshan Ranganathan (1941–2001), Indian organic chemist
- Mildred Rebstock (1919–2011), American Pharmaceutical chemist
- Sibyl Martha Rock (1909–1981), American pioneer in mass spectrometry and computing
- Elizabeth Rona (1890–1981), Hungarian (naturalized American) nuclear chemist and polonium expert
- Mary Swartz Rose (1874–1941), Nutrition chemist
- Melanie Sanford (born 1975), American organic chemist
- Maxine L. Savitz, American Chemist
- Patsy Sherman (1930–2008), American chemist, co-inventor of Scotchgard
- Odette L. Shotwell (1922–1998), organic chemist
- Jean'ne Shreeve (born 1933), American organic chemist
- Dorothy Martin Simon (1919–2016), American physical chemist
- Susan Solomon (born 1956), Atmospheric chemist
- JoAnne Stubbe (born 1946), American biochemist
- Ida Noddack Tacke (1896–1978), German chemist and physicist
- Tsippy Tamiri (1952-2017), Israeli chemist
- Giuliana Tesoro (1921–2002), Polymer chemist
- Margaret Thatcher (1925–2013), British chemist and Prime Minister
- Jean Thomas, British biochemist (chromatin)
- Martha J. B. Thomas (1926–2006), Analytical chemist and chemical engineer
- Ann E. Weber, American organic/medicinal chemist
- Karen Wetterhahn (1948–1997), American metal toxicologist
- Ruth R. Wexler (born 1955), American organic and medicinal chemist, discoverer of two marketed drugs
- M. Christina White (born 1970), American organometallic chemist
- Charlotte Williams, English inorganic chemist
- Angela K. Wilson, American computational, theoretical, and physical chemist
- Ruby K. Worner (1900–1995), American chemist and textiles expert
- Rosalyn Sussman Yalow (1921–2011), American biochemist
- Jenara Vicenta Arnal Yarza (1902–1960), Spanish chemist
- Jean Youatt (born 1925), Australian chemist, biochemist, and microbiologist
- Ada Yonath (born 1939), Israeli crystallographer, Nobel prize in chemistry 2009
- Glaci Zancan (1935–2007), Brazilian biochemist, president of the Brazilian Society for the Progress of the Science (SBPC) from 1999 to 2003

=== 21st century ===
- Heather C. Allen, American chemist whose research focuses air-liquid interfaces
- Rommie Amaro, American chemist focusing on development of computational methods in biophysics for applications to drug discovery.
- Emily Balskus, American organic and biological chemist, and microbiologist. Recipient of the 2020 Alan T. Waterman Award for her work on understanding the chemistry of metabolic processes. Professor at Harvard University.
- Natalie Banerji, Swiss chemist and Professor of Chemistry at the University of Bern who studies organic and hybrid materials using ultrafast spectroscopies.
- Margaret Brimble, New Zealand chemist whose research has included investigations of shellfish toxins and means to treat brain injuries.
- Jane P. Chang, chemical engineer, materials scientist and professor at UCLA known for her research developing advanced atomic layer deposition (ALD) and etching techniques with applications in microelectronics and energy storage devices.
- Sherry Chemler, American Organic Chemist. Professor University at Buffalo. ACS Cope Scholar Award recipient (2017).
- Paulette Clancy, British chemist focusing on computational and machine learning methods, particularly chemistry-informed Bayesian optimization, to model the behavior of semiconductor materials.
- Sheila Hobbs DeWitt, American chemist. Chair, President, CEO, Cofounder of DeuteRx which has developed PXL065 a Deuterated drug. ACS Kathryn C. Hach Award for Entrepreneurial Success (2025). She is a pioneer of Combinatorial Chemistry.
- Elena Galoppini, Italian chemist and professor at Rutgers University–Newark whose research focuses on the development of redox- and photo-active molecules to modify surfaces.
- Juliet Gerrard, New Zealand chemist and Prime Minister's Chief Science Advisor in the administration of Jacinda Ardern.
- Clare Grey, British chemist pioneering the use of nuclear magnetic resonance spectroscopy to study battery technology. Awarded the Körber European Science Prize in 2021. Professor at the University of Cambridge.
- Paula T. Hammond, American chemical engineer focusing on macromolecular design and synthesis of materials for drug delivery systems, particularly in relation to cancer, immunology, and immunotherapy. Professor at MIT.
- Jeanne Hardy, American biophysicist and chemical biologist. Known for her work in the design of allosteric binding sites and control elements into human proteases. Professor at the University of Massachusetts.
- Geraldine Harriman, American Organic Chemist. Developed Firsocostat. Chief Scientific Officer and co-founder of HotSpot.
- Rachel Haurwitz, American biochemist and structural biologist. Her work regards CRISPR based technologies, she is a cofounder of Caribou Biosciences, a genome editing and cell therapy development company.
- Kim Eunkyoung, South Korean materials chemist known for her work in electrochromic (EC) materials design
- Katja Loos, German polymer chemist working on the design, synthesis, and characterisation of novel and sustainable polymeric materials and macromolecules. Chair of the board of the Zernike Institute for Advanced Materials. Professor at the University of Groningen.
- Rachel Mamlok-Naaman, Israeli chemist, specialized in chemistry education
- Corine Mathonière, French materials chemist studying molecular magnetism, spin crossover molecules, and coordination chemistry
- Catherine J. Murphy, American chemist
- Nga Lee (Sally) Ng, atmospheric chemist studying particulates and their effects on air quality, climate, and human health
- Sarah O'Connor, American plant synthetic biologist working in England
- Kimberly Prather, American atmospheric chemist whose research contributed to understanding of atmospheric aerosols and their impact on air quality, climate, and human health
- Gillian Reid, British inorganic chemist. President elect (2020-present) and present (2022-present) of the Royal Society of Chemistry. Professor at the University of Southampton.
- Sarah E Reisman, American organic chemist
- Magdalena Titirici, materials chemist focusing on sustainable materials for energy applications. Professor at Imperial College London.
- Claudia Turro, American inorganic chemist who studies light-initiated reactions of metal complexes with application to disease treatment and solar energy conversion.
- Seble Wagaw, American process chemist and pharma exec
- Marcey Lynn Waters, American chemical biologist and supramolecular chemist
- Jenny Y Yang, American chemist and clean energy researcher at UCI
- Wendy Young, American medicinal chemist and pharmaceutical executive. Chair of ACS Medicinal Chemistry Division (2017).
- Jaqueline Kiplinger, American chemist working at the Los Alamos National Laboratory

== See also ==
- List of female mass spectrometrists
- List of women associated with Marie Curie and Irène Joliot-Curie
- 1904 petition to the Chemical Society
