= Nga Lee (Sally) Ng =

American scientist and professor

Nga Lee Ng
- Education: Hong Kong University of Science and Technology, California Institute of Technology
- Known for: Organic Aerosols, Air Quality, Climate Change
- Awards: American Geophysical Union Ascent Award; AAAR Kenneth T. Whitby Award; NSF CAREER Award
- Scientific career
- Fields: Atmospheric Chemistry
- Workplaces: Georgia Institute of Technology
- Doctoral advisors: John H. Seinfeld, Richard C. Flagan

Nga Lee Ng is the Love Family Professor at the Georgia Institute of Technology, holding appointments in both the School of Chemical and Biomolecular Engineering and the School of Earth and Atmospheric Sciences. Her research focuses on atmospheric chemistry, particularly in the study of organic aerosols and their effects on air quality, climate, and human health.

== Education and early career ==
Ng earned her Bachelor of Engineering degree in Chemical and Environmental Engineering from the Hong Kong University of Science and Technology in 2002. She was an exchange student in Chemical Engineering at the University of Minnesota from 2000 to 2001. She then pursued her graduate studies at the California Institute of Technology, where she completed her M.S. in Chemical Engineering in 2004 and her Ph.D. in 2007 under the supervision of John H. Seinfeld and Richard C. Flagan.

Following her Ph.D., Ng worked as a postdoctoral scholar at the California Institute of Technology (2007-2008) and then as a postdoctoral scientist at Aerodyne Research (2008-2010). She continued at Aerodyne Research as a senior scientist from 2010 to 2011.

== Research and career ==
Ng joined the Georgia Tech faculty in 2011. Her research focuses on the chemistry of atmospheric aerosols, including their formation, transformation, and impacts. Her work has provided insights into the role of organic aerosols in air quality and climate change. She employs advanced analytical techniques and modeling approaches to study the sources, processes, and effects of particulate matter and other air pollutants. She was the lead principal investigator on a $12M National Science Foundation (NSF) grant awarded in 2021 to establish the Atmospheric Science and Chemistry mEasurement NeTwork (ASCENT), which aims to collect real-time measurements of atmospheric particulates' chemical composition and properties at 12 different sites around the United States. She received a Love Family endowed professorship at Georgia Tech in 2022.

Ng has held several editorial positions, including Editor-in-Chief of ACS Environmental Science & Technology Air since 2023, and she has served on the ACS Earth and Space Chemistry and Scientific Reports editorial boards.

== Selected publications ==
- Ng, N. L.; Kroll, J. H.; Chan, A. W. H.; Chhabra, P. S.; Flagan, R. C.; Seinfeld, J. H. (July 24, 2007). "Secondary organic aerosol formation from m-xylene, toluene, and benzene". Atmospheric Chemistry and Physics. 7 (14): 3909–3922. Bibcode:2007ACP.....7.3909N. doi:10.5194/acp-7-3909-2007. ISSN 1680-7324.
- Ng, N. L.; Canagaratna, M. R.; Zhang, Q.; Jimenez, J. L.; Tian, J.; Ulbrich, I. M.; Kroll, J. H.; Docherty, K. S.; Chhabra, P. S.; Bahreini, R.; Murphy, S. M.; Seinfeld, J. H.; Hildebrandt, L.; Donahue, N. M.; DeCarlo, P. F.; Lanz, V. A.; Prévôt, A. S. H.; Dinar, E.; Rudich, Y.; Worsnop, D. R. (May 20, 2010). "Organic aerosol components observed in Northern Hemispheric datasets from Aerosol Mass Spectrometry". Atmospheric Chemistry and Physics. 10 (10): 4625–4641. Bibcode:2010ACP....10.4625N. doi:10.5194/acp-10-4625-2010. hdl:1721.1/67889. ISSN 1680-7324.
- Ng, N. L.; Herndon, S. C.; Trimborn, A.; Canagaratna, M. R.; Croteau, P. L.; Onasch, T. B.; Sueper, D.; Worsnop, D. R.; Zhang, Q.; Sun, Y. L.; Jayne, J. T. (2011). "An Aerosol Chemical Speciation Monitor (ACSM) for Routine Monitoring of the Composition and Mass Concentrations of Ambient Aerosol". Aerosol Science and Technology. 45 (7): 780–794. Bibcode:2011AerST..45..780N. doi:10.1080/02786826.2011.560211. ISSN 0278-6826.
- Liu, Fobang; Ng, Nga Lee (June 6, 2023). Toxicity of Atmospheric Aerosols: Methodologies & Assays. Washington, DC, USA: American Chemical Society. doi:10.1021/acsinfocus.7e7012. ISBN 978-0-8412-9981-8.
- Eftekhari, Azin; Won, Youngbo; Morrison, Glenn; Ng, Nga Lee (June 28, 2023). Chemistry of Indoor Air Pollution. Washington, DC, USA: American Chemical Society. doi:10.1021/acsinfocus.7e7018. ISBN 978-0-8412-9983-2.

== Awards and honors ==
- Sheldon K. Friedlander Award, American Association for Aerosol Research (2010)
- Early Career Award, Environmental Protection Agency (2013)
- Walter W. Rosenblith New Investigator Award, Health Effects Institute (2013)
- National Science Foundation CAREER Award (2015)
- Kenneth T. Whitby Award, American Association for Aerosol Research (2016)
- Award from the Dreyfus Foundation Postdoctoral Program in Environmental Chemistry (2017)
- ISI Highly Cited Researcher, Clarivate Analytics (2017-2019)
- Robert W. Vaughan Lectureship, California Institute of Technology (2021)
- Ascent Award, American Geophysical Union (2023)
