= Lynn Russell =

Lynn Russell may refer to:

- Lynn M. Russell, atmospheric scientist at Scripps Institution of Oceanography
- Lynn Russell (character)

== See also ==
- Lynne Russell, American journalist and author
- Lynn Russell Chadwick, English sculptor and artist
- Lynn Russell Williams, Canadian labor leader
- Theresa Lynn Russell, American actress
