= C19H20N2O3S =

The molecular formula C_{19}H_{20}N_{2}O_{3}S (molar mass: 356.41 g/mol, exact mass: 356.1195 u) may refer to:

- Apricoxib
- Pioglitazone (Actos)
- PXL065
