= Sheila DeWitt =

American chemist and inventor

- Born: Sheila Hobbs; May 23, 1960 (age 66); Gasport, NY
- Education: Cornell University, B.A., Chemistry (1982); Duke University, Ph.D., Organic Chemistry (1986)
- Known for: Deuterium-Enabled Chiral Switching; High-Throughput Chemistry
- Awards: Kathryn C. Hach Award for Entrepreneurial Success, American Chemical Society (2025); Gertrude Elion Medicinal Chemistry Award, American Chemical Society (2025)
- Scientific career
- Fields: Medicinal Chemistry
- Workplaces: FMC Corporation; Parke-Davis Pharmaceutical Research; Orchid Biocomputer; Deuteria Pharmaceuticals; DeuteRx

Sheila DeWitt (née Hobbs) is an American chemist, inventor, and businesswoman. She has worked on automated and high-throughput chemistry (aka combinatorial chemistry) during her time at Parke-Davis, chemistry-on-a-chip during her time at Orchid Biosciences, and deuterium-enabled chiral switching (DECS), a deuterated drug, during her time at Deuteria Pharmaceuticals and DeuteRx.

== Education ==
Sheila DeWitt earned her B.A. in Chemistry from Cornell University in 1982 and Ph.D. in synthetic organic chemistry from Duke University in 1986.

== Career ==
After graduating with her Ph.D., DeWitt worked as a process chemist for FMC Corporation Agricultural Chemical Division in Middleport, NY, where she had worked previously as a research assistant and chemist during college. Dr. DeWitt later moved to Ann Arbor, Michigan, to work as a scientist and eventual Chair (1993–1997) of the Molecular Diversity Project Team at Parke-Davis Pharmaceutical Research. At Orchid Biocomputer in Princeton, NJ, she began working as the Director of Business Development in 1997.

Following the 2008 recession, DeWitt co-founded Deuteria Pharmaceuticals, Inc., which Celgene acquired in December 2012 for $42M. Following the acquisition, DeWitt formed DeuteRx, LLC, to develop further deuterated drug products. In 2018, DeuteRx sold PXL065 (formerly DRX-065), deuterium-stabilitized (R)-enantiomer of pioglitazone, and related deuterated thiazolidinedione products to Poxel SA, a French clinical-stage biopharmaceutical company focused on therapies for rare metabolic diseases. Poxel announced positive results from the PXL065 Phase 2 trial in March 2023. Salarius Pharmaceuticals, Inc., purchased SP-3164 (formerly DRX-164) and related protein degraders from DeuteRx in January 2022.

== Awards and recognition ==
Biotechnology Innovation Organization (BIO) announced Sheila DeWitt as the 2012 Buzz of BIO winner at the corresponding BIO International Convention.

In 2013, Sheila DeWitt was featured in the C&E News cover story, "Female Entrepreneurs: Facing challenges beyond science and business."

DeWitt is featured in Famous Organic Chemists by the American Chemical Society. In 2025, DeWitt was awarded two awards by the American Chemical Society: the Kathryn C. Hach Award for Entrepreneurial Success and the Gertrude Elion Medicinal Chemistry Award.

== Research ==
While at Parke-Davis Pharmaceutical Research, a division of Warner-Lambert Company, DeWitt worked on combinatorial chemistry. She and team members developed the "DIVERSOMER method" at Parke-Davis in the early 1990s to run up to 40 chemical reactions in parallel. These efforts led to the first commercially available equipment for combinatorial chemistry (the DIVERSOMER synthesizer, which was sold by Chemglass) and the first use of liquid handling robotics within a chemistry laboratory. In 1997, she co-edited "A Practical Guide to Combinatorial Chemistry" with Anthony W. Czarnik.

== Publications ==
Her work has published over 35 scientific publications, 7 book chapters, and more than 60 issued patents.

== Personal life ==
Sheila DeWitt grew up in Gasport, NY, and attended Royalton-Hartland High School. In 2013, she and her husband, Joe, founded the Hobbs-DeWitt Scholarship which awards scholarships to Roy-Hart seniors pursuing a 4-year degree in science, engineering, or related discipline.
