= Mary O'Reilly =

Mary O'Reilly may refer to:

- Mary Boyle O'Reilly (1873–1939), Irish-American social reformer, clubwoman, and journalist
- Mary Jane O'Reilly (born 1950), New Zealand dancer and choreographer
- Mary Margaret O'Reilly (1865–1949), American civil servant
