= James Jeffrey Roche =

American journalist (1847–1908)

James Jeffery Roche
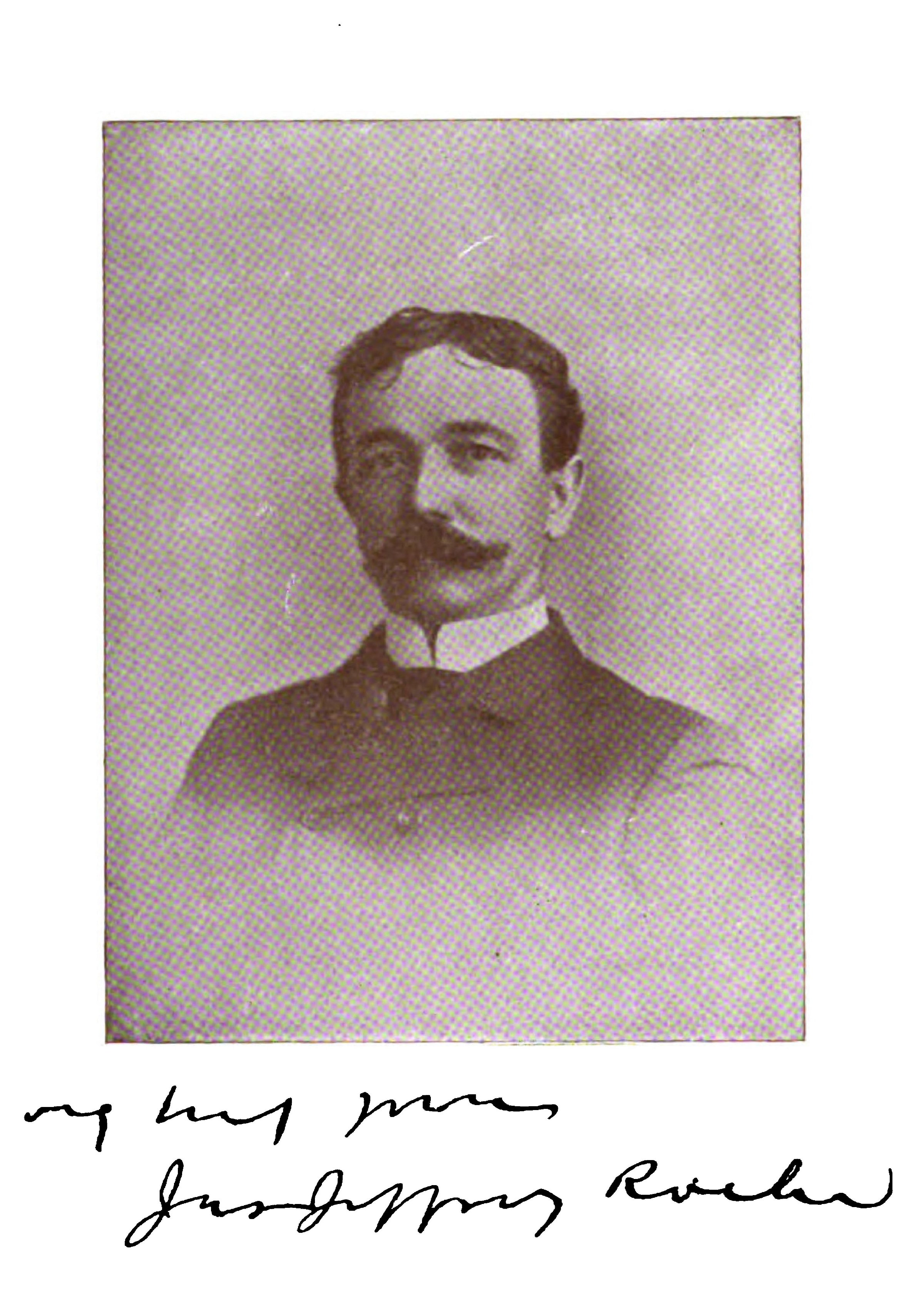
- Roche in 1889
- Born: May 31, 1847; Mountmellick, Ireland
- Died: April 3, 1908 (aged 60); Bern, Switzerland
- Resting place: Holyhood Cemetery, Brookline, Massachusetts, United States
- Title: American Consul in Switzerland
- Term: April 1907 – 3 April 1908
- Spouse: Mary Frances Halloran (m. 1875–85; her death)
- Children: 2, including Arthur Somers Roche

James Jeffrey Roche (May 31, 1847 – April 3, 1908) was an Irish-American poet, journalist and diplomat. Roche emigrated as a young child, and grew up in Prince Edward Island, Canada. He came to Boston in 1866, and joined the staff of the Irish newspaper. He became editor-in-chief in 1890, and was a leading spokesman for Catholic intellectuals in New England. When most Democrats in the region deserted William Jennings Bryan in 1896, Roche and the Boston Pilot gave Brian strong support. At the end of his life he was the American Consul in Switzerland.

== Life and works ==
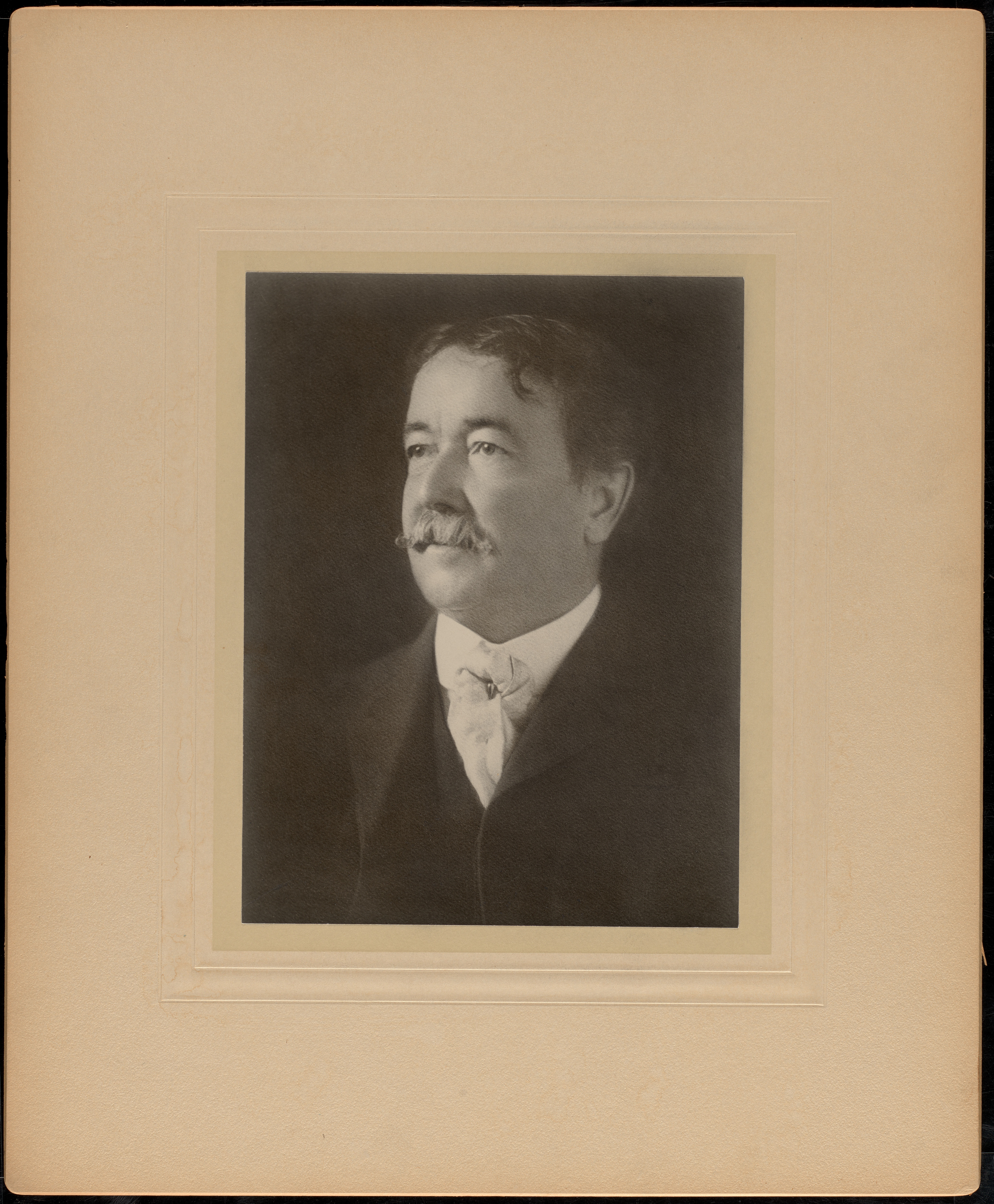
Portrait photograph of James Jeffrey Roche (1847–1908), Mass., ca. 1893. Massachusetts. Executive Office of Energy and Environmental Affairs, Metropolitan Park Commission, Founders and Commissioners, Photographic Portraits, Massachusetts Archives

Through his father, Edward Roche, an able mathematician and scholar, who occupied the office of Provincial Librarian in Prince Edward Island, he inherited the literary quality dominant in his temperament and his art. The family settled in Prince Edward Island in the same year as his birth. The boy was educated by his father, and later in St. Dunstan's College. Here, at the age of fifteen, foreshadowing his career, he turned journalist and proudly edited the college weekly "unto the urn and ashes" of its infant end. His youth had a fair share of spirited adventure, an encountering of odd characters and scenes, a sharp observance of events, and a close, rapid, honest mental life.

In 1866 he went to Boston, became a businessman and prospered there, but later reverted to literature, his early love and first unconscious choice. In print he was noted for an absurd, unique humor. Already married, in 1883 he joined the staff of the Boston Boston Pilot as an assistant editor under John Boyle O'Reilly, and later became editor of the newspaper. At this time he wrote a History of the Filibusters in Spanish America, a novel, and a drama. In 1886, he published Songs and Satires.

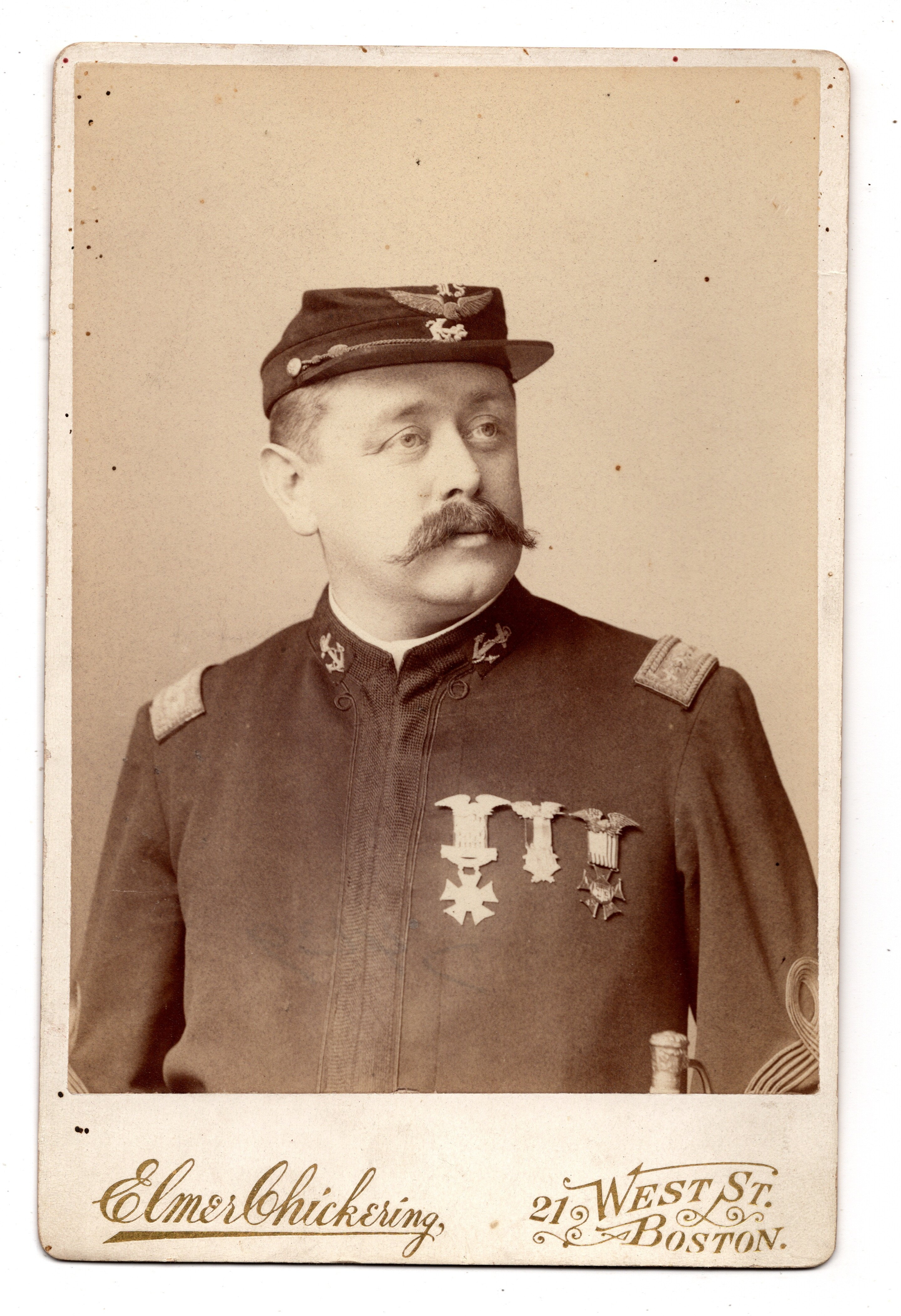
James Jeffrey Roche in Naval Uniform

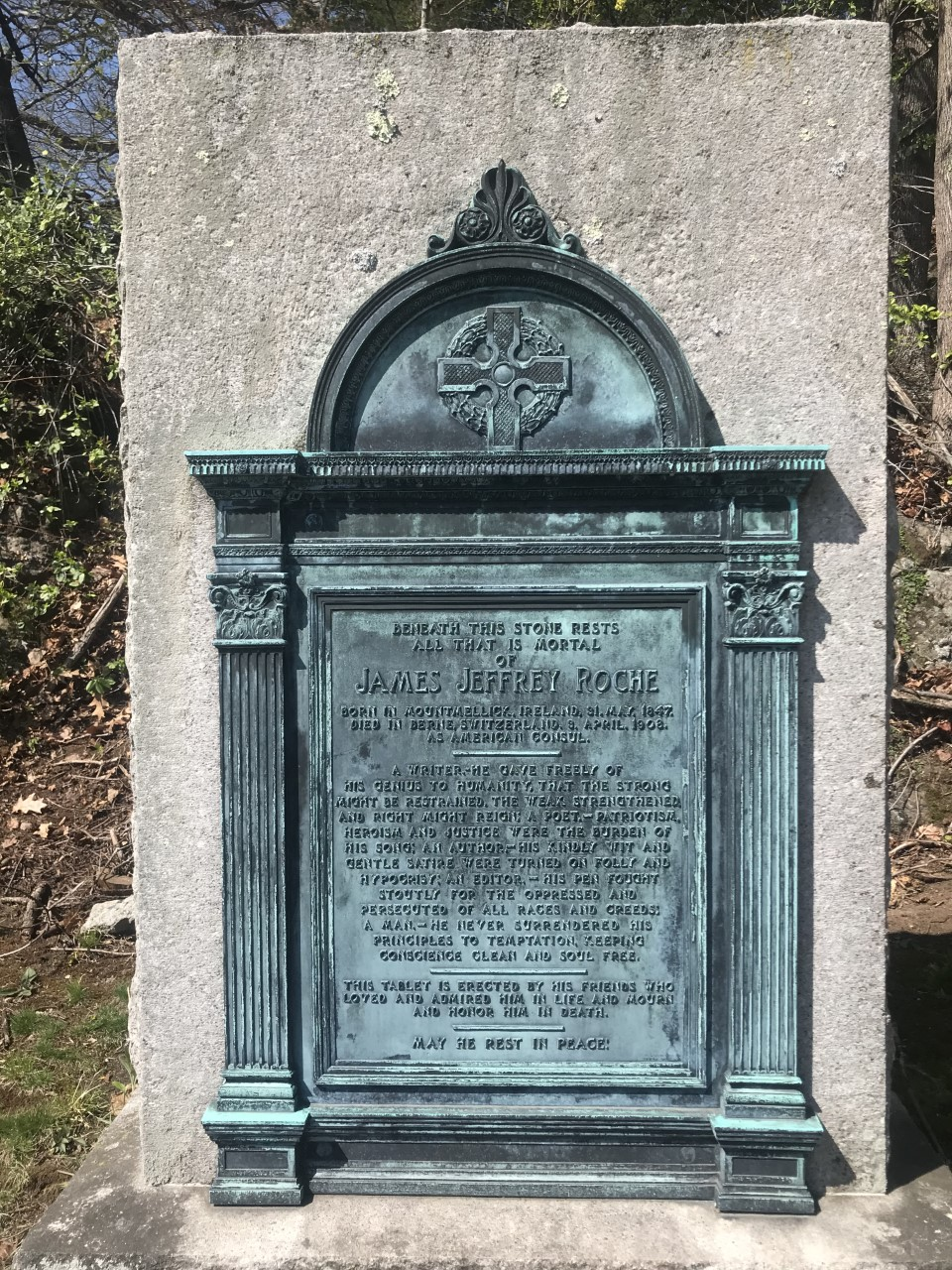
James Jeffrey Roche Tombstone in Holyhood Cemetery

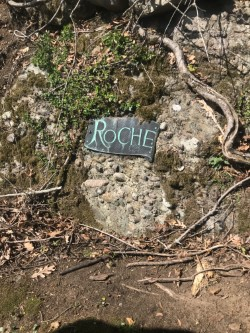
Bronze plaque embedded in the rock face next to the tombstone for James Jeffrey Roche in Holyhood Cemetery

== Works ==
- Songs and Satires (1887) Boston & Cambridge (USA)
- Life of John Boyle O'Reilly (1891)
- Ballads of Blue Water (1895) Boston
- The Vase and Other Bric-a-brac (1900)
- Her Majesty the King, A Romance of the Harem (1901)
- ”Panama” (1904)
