= Holyhood Cemetery =

Historic cemetery in Massachusetts

- U.S. National Register of Historic Places
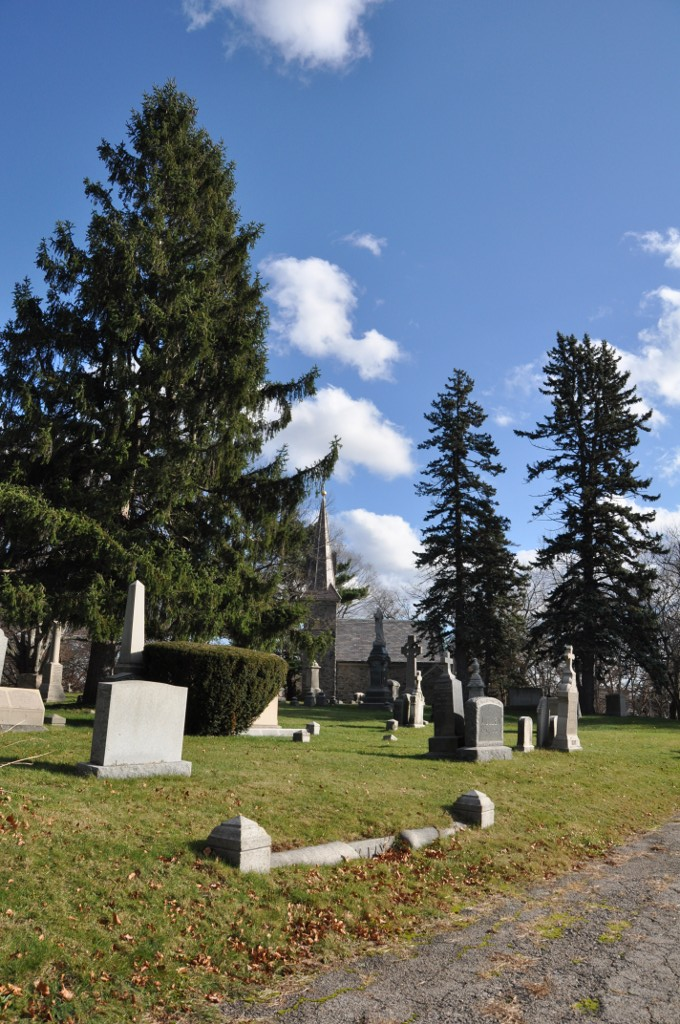

- Location within Massachusetts Location within the United States
- Location: Heath Street, Brookline, Massachusetts
- Coordinates: 42°19′12″N 71°10′1″W
- Area: 35 acres (14 ha)
- Built: 1857
- Architect: Patrick Keely
- Architectural style: Gothic Revival
- MPS: Brookline MRA
- NRHP reference No.: 85003275
- Added to NRHP: October 17, 1985

Holyhood Cemetery is a cemetery located in Brookline, Massachusetts.

== Description ==
Laid out in 1857, the cemetery was designed to reflect the rural cemetery movement begun at Cambridge's Mount Auburn Cemetery. It was the first such cemetery in Brookline. The cemetery was listed on the National Register of Historic Places in 1985. Most of the cemetery has the layout typical of rural cemeteries, with winding lanes and attractive landscaping. One section, known as the "German Acre" and located near the entrance, has a more traditional rectilinear form; it was laid out for a congregation of predominantly German Catholics. The cemetery chapel, built 1859–62, is set on a hill near its center, and was designed by Patrick Keely, an architect of Catholic churches. It is a Gothic Revival structure, built out of puddingstone.

== Notable burials ==
=== Kennedy family ===
Holyhood Cemetery is best known for being the final resting place of Joseph and Rose Fitzgerald Kennedy (parents of U.S. President John, U.S. Attorney General Robert, and U.S. Senator Edward). Their daughter Rosemary Kennedy is also buried here, along with several other family members. Joan Bennett Kennedy is buried here too.

The last child born to President Kennedy and First Lady Jacqueline Kennedy, Patrick Bouvier Kennedy, was also buried at Holyhood Cemetery, until being removed to Arlington National Cemetery, along with a stillborn daughter originally buried in Newport, Rhode Island, following their father's assassination and burial there in 1963.

=== Others ===
Holyhood is also the final resting place of former Boston mayor and U.S. representative Patrick Collins, with a memorial sculpted by Cyrus Edwin Dallin; Cardinal John Wright; golfer Francis Ouimet; baseball player George Wright; Irish poet and journalist John Boyle O'Reilly; author, poet, journalist and diplomat James Jeffrey Roche; and lightbulb pioneer and engineer Martha J. B. Thomas. John Geoghan, an American Roman Catholic priest and serial child rapist is also interred there.

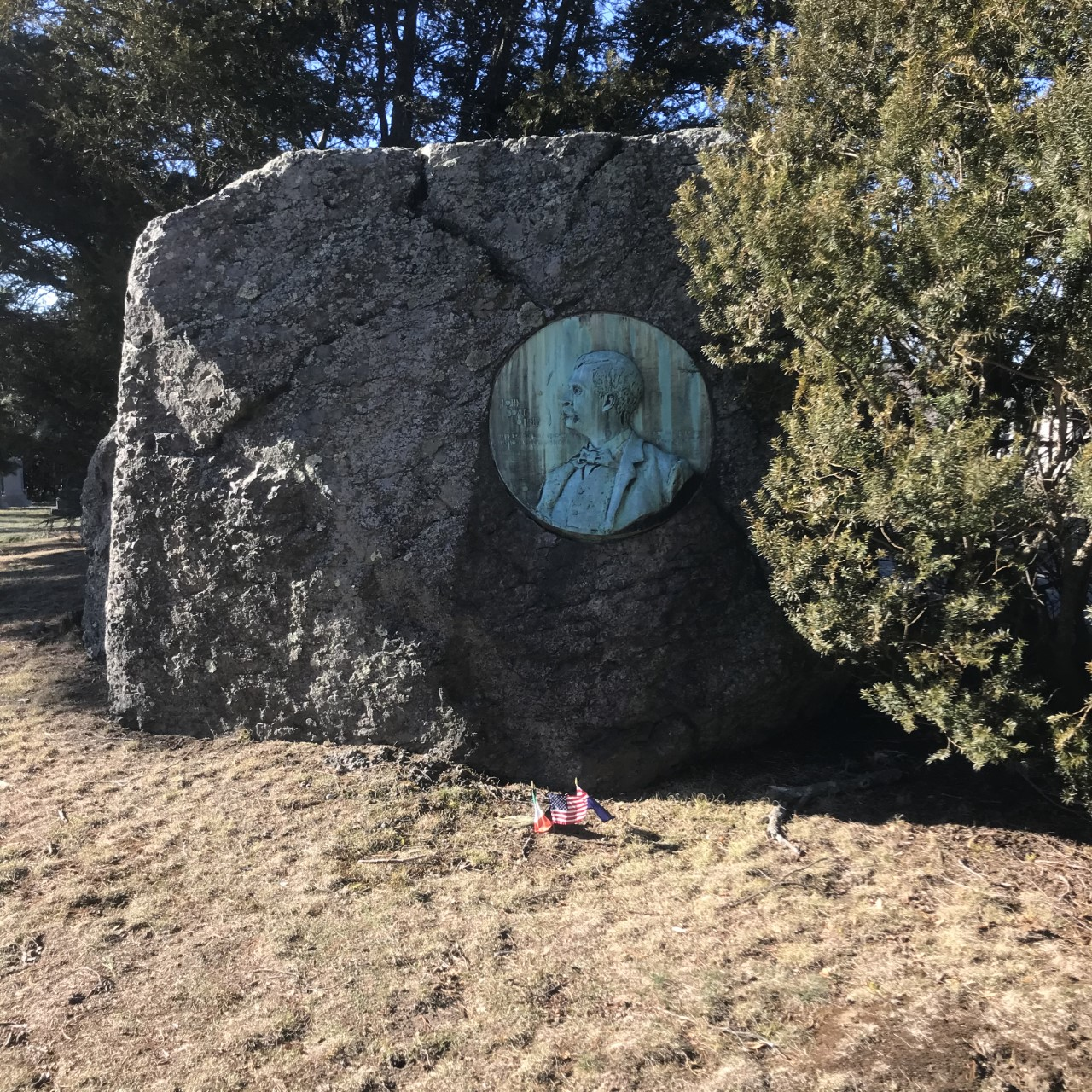
John Boyle O'Reilly Tombstone Holyhood Cemetery Brookline, Massachusetts

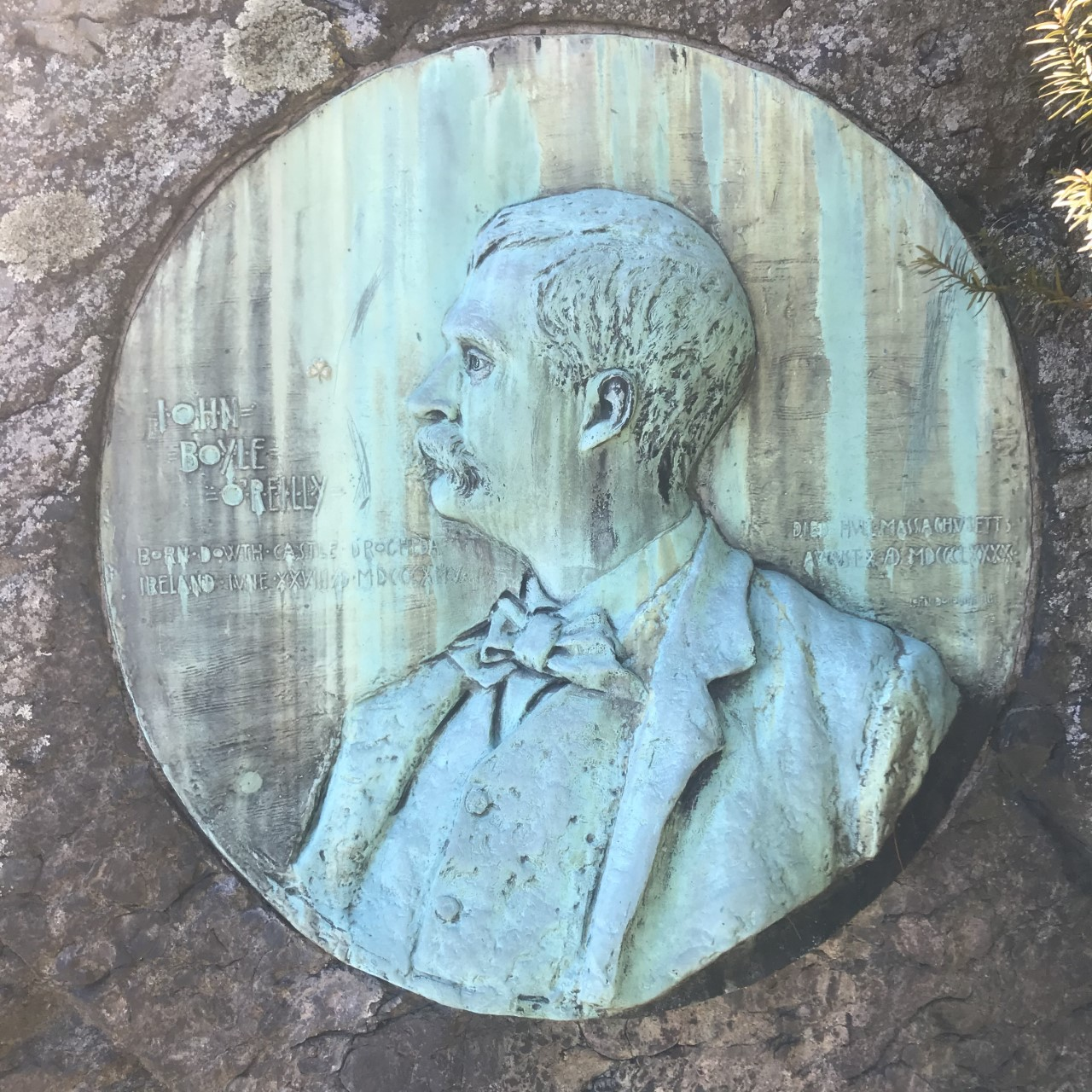
John Boyle O'Reilly Tombstone Plaque Close-up Holyhood Cemetery Brookline, Massachusetts

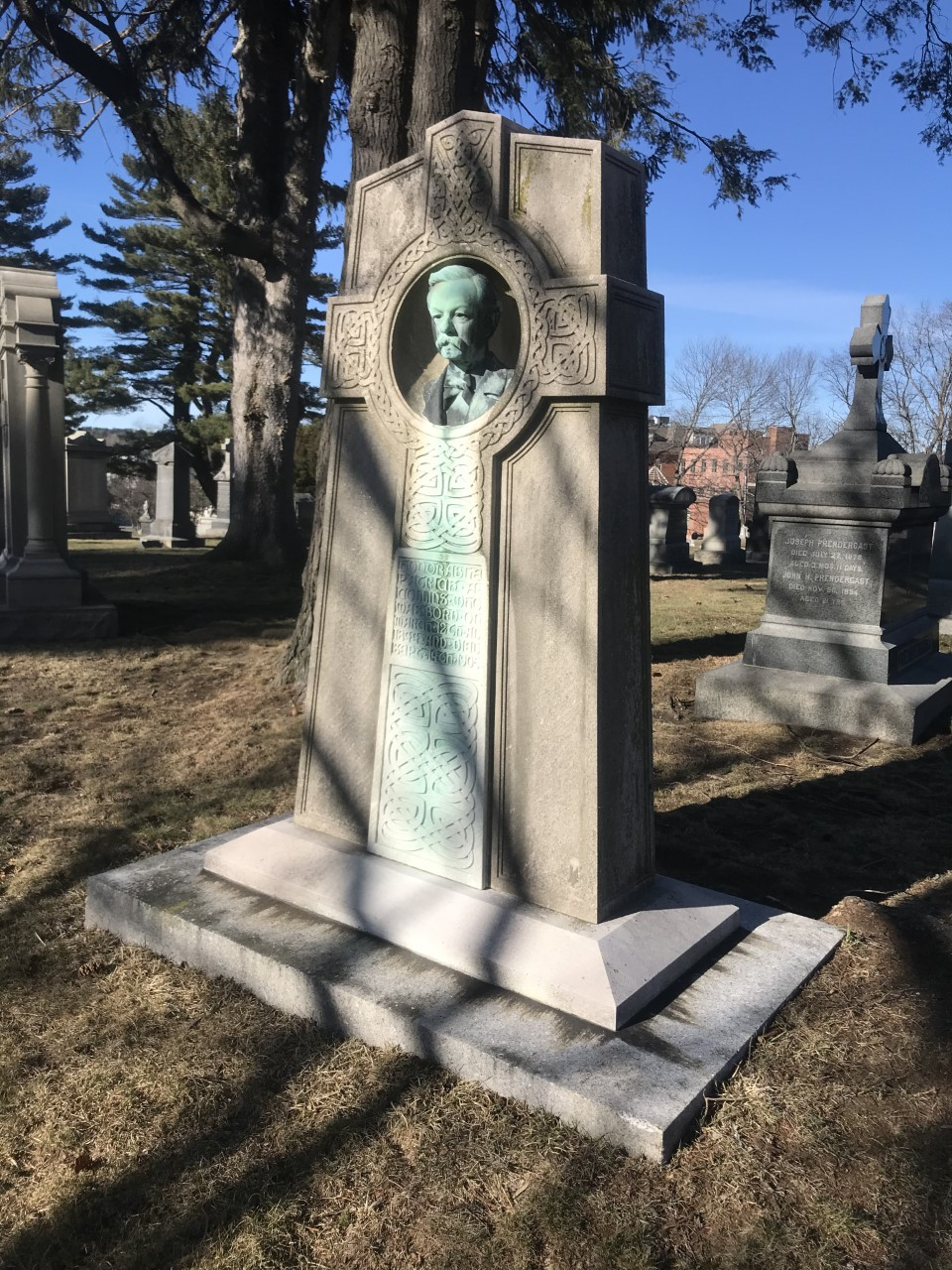
Patrick A Collins Memorial – designed and executed by Cyrus Dallin

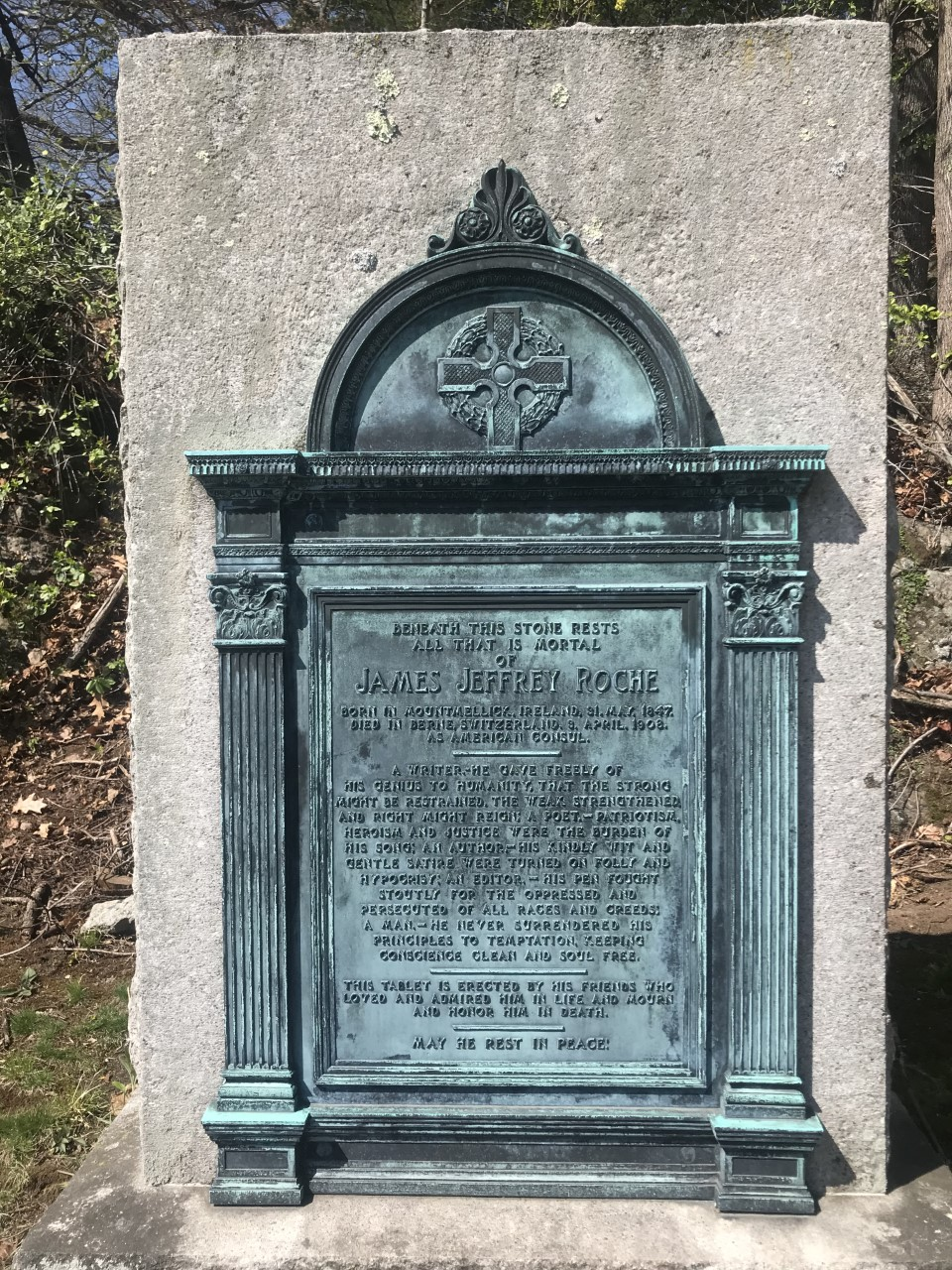
James Jeffrey Roche Tombstone

== Commonwealth War Grave ==
The cemetery contains one Commonwealth war burial, of an American-born Royal Air Force Cadet of World War I, William Becker Hagan.

== See also ==
- National Register of Historic Places listings in Brookline, Massachusetts
