= Sonia Kreidenweis =

American atmospheric scientist and researcher

Sonia Maria Kreidenweis
- Other name: Sonia Maria Kreidenweis-Dandy
- Education: California Institute of Technology; Manhattan College
- Scientific career
- Workplaces: Colorado State University; San Jose State University
- Thesis: Experimental and theoretical studies of binary nucleation and condensation (1989)
- Doctoral advisor: John H. Seinfeld

Sonia Maria Kreidenweis is an American professor of atmospheric sciences at Colorado State University. Her research considers aerosols and their impact on weather and the climate. She has previously served as president of the American Association for Aerosol Research and was a board member of the American Meteorological Society. She was elected a Fellow of the American Geophysical Union in 2019.

== Early life and education ==
Kreidenweis grew up in New York City. As a child she was aware of air pollution, and became interested in investigating smog. She studied chemical engineering at Manhattan College in 1983. She was the first in her family to complete a Bachelor's degree. During her undergraduate degree she decided she would pursue studying, and chose to for academics who were becoming increasingly interested in air quality and environmental issues. She moved to California Institute of Technology for her graduate studies, earning a Master's degree in 1985 and a doctorate in 1989. She was supervised by John H. Seinfeld and worked on binary nucleation.

== Research and career ==
After earning her PhD, Kreidenweis was appointed to San Jose State University as an assistant professor. She worked simultaneously as a consultant for Lawrence Livermore National Laboratory, where she advised on chemical interactions in the atmosphere. Kreidenweis joined the faculty at Colorado State University in 1991. She spent 1999 as a visiting fellow at the Goddard Space Flight Center and remains affiliated with the Airborne Science Program. Her research considers the physical, chemical and optical properties of atmospheric particles. She has investigated the interactions of atmospheric aerosol on climate and visibility, as well as how aerosols interact with water vapour. She has developed several new scientific approaches to study aerosols and atmospheric particulates. She has created the methodologies to evaluate the consequences of pollution on precipitation, leading to a better understanding of the impact of aerosols on cloud formation and evolution. Her work has focussed on air pollution in US National Parks.

In 2015 Kreidenweis was awarded a $7.5 million United States Naval Research Laboratory grant to characterise aerosol particles in coastal regions. She has investigated cloud condensation nuclei and their representation in climate models. In this capacity, she is a member of the National Science Foundation program Western Wildfire Experiment for Cloud Chemistry, Aerosol Absorption and Nitrogen (WE-CAN). The program looks to understand the chemistry in western wildfire smoke, which has significant impacts on air quality, climate, weather and nutrient cycles. Kreidenweis leads the cloud condensation nuclei counter.

Kreidenweis is interested in the characteristics of atmospheric particles that are responsible for compromised visibility, and has extensively studied the impacts of wildfires. She has investigated how breathable particles grow and form new particles during wild fires, performing open burns of biomass at the Missoula Fire Sciences Lab.

She was made a University Distinguished Professor in 2014. In 2015 she served as Dean for Research at the Colorado State University College of Engineering. She serves on the Membership Committee of the American Meteorological Society.

=== Awards and honours ===
Her awards and honours include;

- 1993 Office of Naval Research Young Investigator Award
- 1995 Colorado State University Engineering Dean's Council Award
- 1995 Elected Fellow of the Cooperative Institute for Research in the Atmosphere
- 2005 Colorado State University Professor of the Year
- 2005 Geophysical Research Letters Editors' Citation for Excellence in Refereeing
- 2008 Colorado State University George T. Abell Outstanding Teaching and Service Faculty Award
- 2010 Elected Fellow of the American Association for Aerosol Research
- 2011 Elected Fellow of the American Meteorological Society
- 2015 American Association for Aerosol Research David Sinclair Award
- 2015 American Geophysical Union Excellence in Reviewing
- 2018 Colorado Women of Influence Women of Vision Award
- 2019 Elected Fellow of the American Geophysical Union

=== Selected publications ===
Her publications include;

- Kreidenweis, Sonia M. (2007-04-18). "A single parameter representation of hygroscopic growth and cloud condensation nucleus activity" (PDF). Atmospheric Chemistry and Physics. 7 (8): 1961–1971. Bibcode:2007ACP.....7.1961P. doi:10.5194/acp-7-1961-2007.
- Kreidenweis, Sonia M. (2003). "African dust aerosols as atmospheric ice nuclei". Geophysical Research Letters. 30 (14) 2003GL017410: 1732. Bibcode:2003GeoRL..30.1732D. doi:10.1029/2003GL017410. hdl:2060/20040034050.
- Kreidenweis, Sonia M. (2010). "Predicting global atmospheric ice nuclei distributions and their impacts on climate". Proceedings of the National Academy of Sciences. 107 (25): 11217–11222. Bibcode:2010PNAS..10711217D. doi:10.1073/pnas.0910818107. PMC 2895116. PMID 20534566.

Kreidenweis is associate editor of the Journal of Advances in Modeling Earth Systems.
