= Acta Chromatographica =

Peer-reviewed academic journal

- Discipline: Chromatography
- Language: English
- Edited by: Teresa Kowalska, Mieczyslaw Sajewicz

Publication details
- History: 1992–present
- Publisher: Akadémiai Kiadó
- Frequency: Quarterly
- Open access: Yes
- License: Creative Commons Attribution 4.0
- Impact factor: 2.011 (2021)

Standard abbreviations
- ISO 4: Acta Chromatogr.

Indexing
- ISSN: 2083-5736

Links
- Journal homepage

Acta Chromatographica is a quarterly peer-reviewed scientific journal published by Akadémiai Kiadó (Budapest, Hungary). It covers research on all aspects of chromatography. The current editors-in-chief was Teresa Kowalska (University of Silesia in Katowice) and is Mieczyslaw Sajewicz (University of Silesia in Katowice). It was established in 1992 by the Institute of Chemistry at the University of Silesia in Katowice, and is gold open access.

== Abstracting and indexing ==
The journal is abstracted and indexed in:

- CAB Abstracts
- ProQuest databases
- Science Citation Index Expanded
- Scopus
- Veterinary Science Database

According to the Journal Citation Reports, the journal has a 2021 impact factor of 2.011, ranking it 66th out of 87 journals in the category "Analytical Chemistry".
