= Richard Flagan =

American chemical engineer

Richard C. Flagan
- Born: 1947 (age 78–79)
- Education: University of Michigan; Massachusetts Institute of Technology
- Scientific career
- Fields: Atmospheric science, Chemical engineering
- Workplaces: California Institute of Technology
- Doctoral advisor: John P. Appleton

Richard Charles Flagan (born 1947) is an American chemical engineer known for his research on aerosols, both in atmospheric science studies and in the processing of materials. He is the McCollum-Corcoran Professor of Chemical Engineering and Environmental Science and Engineering at the California Institute of Technology.

Flagan has contributed to advancements in aerosol measurement techniques, such as the development of the scanning mobility particle sizer and mobility analyzers, which enable the study of particle size distributions undergoing rapid evolution down to 1 nm in diameter.

== Education ==
Flagan received his B.S.E. in mechanical engineering from University of Michigan in 1969 and S.M. and Ph.D. degrees from Massachusetts Institute of Technology in 1973, also in mechanical engineering. His Ph.D. dissertation was titled The formation of nitric oxide from organic nitrogen contained in fossil fuels. During his doctoral research he studied combustion of kerosene doped with pyridine or pyrrole to simulate burning of fuel oil. His studies revealed that turbulent mixing influences nitric oxide (NO) emissions from organic nitrogen in fossil fuels, with poor initial fuel-air mixing leading to lower NO concentrations. Exploring the interaction between chemical kinetics and turbulent mixing, he was able to develop a model that predicted NO emissions by incorporating it into a model which took into account flow non-uniformities in the burner where the reactions were occurring.

== Career ==
Flagan joined California Institute of Technology (Caltech) in 1975 as an assistant professor in the environmental engineering science program within the Division of Engineering and Applied Science. Both Sheldon K. Friedlander, who moved to UCLA, and John H. Seinfeld who was a frequently collaborator at CalTech, influenced him to move from focusing on combustion and turbulent reacting flows, to focusing on aerosols.

In 1981 Flagan became associate professor and was promoted to full professor in 1986. Over time, his research interests expanded beyond environmental research questions. While he initially studied particle formation in combustion systems and photochemical smog, he later collaborated with JPL on using aerosols to refine silicon for more efficient photovoltaic production. With this shift in focus he transferred to the Chemical Engineering department in 1990. His research advanced aerosol measurement techniques, enabling detection and analysis of different sizes and compositions of atmospheric particulates. He holds at least 25 patents for his invented instruments and various aerosol reactor technologies.

In 2000, as his work was more inline with the Environmental Engineering Division he re-established his formal affiliation with the program and at that time was appointed to an endowed professorship with the full title Irma and Ross McCollum-William H. Corcoran Professor.

Flagan was president of the American Association for Aerosol Research from 1996-1997 and is editor-in-chief emeritus of the journal Aerosol Science and Technology. He was elected to the National Academy of Engineering in 2010 and is a member of the board of directors of the California Council on Science and Technology.

Flagan has been interviewed as an expert for articles discussing particulates and aerosols. In a New York Times piece on dust, he explained how particle size affects how fast dust falls, why a damp cloth is an effective dust remover and why the centrifugal windstorm generated by bagless vacuum cleaners are unlikely to pick up most small particles. In an Associated Press article during the COVID-19 pandemic, he advised using an N95 mask for two or three days, emphasizing that duration of use is more critical than frequency. He noted that the mask's performance degrades as particles accumulate on it.

== Selected publications ==
- Flagan, Richard C.; Friedlander, Sheldon K. (1978). "Particle formation in pulverized coal combustion: A review". In Shaw, David T. (ed.). Recent Developments in Aerosol Science. Vol. 2. Wiley. pp. 25–59. ISBN 0471029505.
- Wang, Shih Chen; Flagan, Richard C. (1990). "Scanning Electrical Mobility Spectrometer". Aerosol Science and Technology. 13 (2): 230–240. Bibcode:1990AerST..13..230W. doi:10.1080/02786829008959441. ISSN 0278-6826.
- Odum, Jay R.; Hoffmann, Thorsten; Bowman, Frank; Collins, Don; Flagan, Richard C.; Seinfeld, John H. (1996). "Gas/Particle Partitioning and Secondary Organic Aerosol Yields". Environmental Science & Technology. 30 (8): 2580–2585. Bibcode:1996EnST...30.2580O. doi:10.1021/es950943+. ISSN 0013-936X.
- Hoffmann, Thorsten; Odum, Jay R.; Bowman, Frank; Collins, Donald; Klockow, Dieter; Flagan, Richard C.; Seinfeld, John H. (1997). "Formation of Organic Aerosols from the Oxidation of Biogenic Hydrocarbons". Journal of Atmospheric Chemistry. 26 (2): 189–222. Bibcode:1997JAtC...26..189H. doi:10.1023/A:1005734301837.
- Armani, Andrea M.; Kulkarni, Rajan P.; Fraser, Scott E.; Flagan, Richard C.; Vahala, Kerry J. (2007). "Label-Free, Single-Molecule Detection with Optical Microcavities". Science. 317 (5839): 783–787. Bibcode:2007Sci...317..783A. doi:10.1126/science.1145002. ISSN 0036-8075. PMID 17615303.
- Flagan, Richard C. (2011). "Electrical Mobility Methods for Submicrometer Particle Characterization". Aerosol Measurement. Wiley. pp. 339–364. doi:10.1002/9781118001684.ch15. ISBN 978-0-470-38741-2.
- Flagan, Richard C.; Seinfeld, John H. (2012). Fundamentals of Air Pollution Engineering. Mineola, N.Y: Dover Publications. ISBN 978-0-486-48872-1.
- Amanatidis, Stavros; Huang, Yuanlong; Pushpawela, Buddhi; Schulze, Benjamin C.; Kenseth, Christopher M.; Ward, Ryan X.; Seinfeld, John H.; Hering, Susanne V.; Flagan, Richard C. (June 18, 2021). "Efficacy of a portable, moderate-resolution, fast-scanning differential mobility analyzer for ambient aerosol size distribution measurements". Atmospheric Measurement Techniques. 14 (6): 4507–4516. Bibcode:2021AMT....14.4507A. doi:10.5194/amt-14-4507-2021. ISSN 1867-8548.

== Honors and awards ==
- Thomas Baron Award in Fluid Particle Systems from the American Institute of Chemical Engineers (1997)
- Fuchs Award (2006), given jointly every four years by the American Association for Aerosol Research, Gesellschaft für Aerosolforschung, and Japan Association of Aerosol Science and Technology, considered the highest honor bestowed for work in the field of aerosol science.
- American Chemical Society Award for Creative Advances in Environmental Science and Technology (2007)
- National Academy of Engineering, Elected Member (2010)
