= Jane P. Chang =

American chemical engineer

- Born: 1970 (age 55–56)
- Education: National Taiwan University (BS); Massachusetts Institute of Technology (MS, PhD)
- Scientific career
- Fields: Electrochemistry; Chemical engineering
- Workplaces: University of California Los Angeles (UCLA)
- Thesis: Study of plasma-surface kinetics and simulation of feature profile evolution in chlorine etching of patterned polysilicon (1998)
- Doctoral advisor: Herbert H. Sawin

Jane P. Chang is a Taiwanese-American chemical engineer and materials scientist known for her research developing advanced atomic layer deposition (ALD) and etching techniques. Her research focuses on creating thin films and coatings with precise properties for use in microelectronics, energy devices, and other advanced materials applications.

== Education ==
Chang graduated from National Taiwan University with a Bachelor of Science (B.S.) in chemical engineering in 1993. She then earned a Master of Science (M.S.) in 1995 and her Ph.D. in 1998, both from the Massachusetts Institute of Technology (MIT) in chemical engineering.

== Research and career ==
She is the William F. Seyer Chair and Professor of Chemical and Biomolecular Engineering at the UCLA. Her research centers on the synthesis and chemical processing of novel materials with a focus on atomic layer-controlled thin-film deposition and the atomistic understanding of solid-state interfaces. Her lab studies plasma chemistry and surface interactions, which have contributed to advances in semiconductor processing, optoelectronic devices, and nanostructured materials. This includes efforts to develop high-κ dielectric, oxide-based films, e.g. HfO_{2}, HfSiO_{4}, ZrO_{2}, for electronic devices and explore sustainable approaches to improve catalyst longevity in chemical processing. These efforts have applications in electronics, microsensors, optoelectronics, solar cells, batteries, and energy storage devices.

Chang was the first woman to receive the AVS Plasma Prize (2018), which is the highest honor of the AVS Plasma Science & Technology Division.

== Selected publications ==
See references and:

- Chen, Francis F.; Chang, Jane P. (2009). Lecture Notes on Principles of Plasma Processing. Springer US. ISBN 978-0306474972.
- Choi, J.H.; Mao, Y.; Chang, J.P. (2011). "Development of hafnium based high-k materials—A review". Materials Science and Engineering R: Reports. 72 (6). Elsevier BV: 97–136. doi:10.1016/j.mser.2010.12.001. ISSN 0927-796X.

== Awards and honors ==
- National Science Foundation CAREER Award (2000)
- AVS Fellow (2013)
- AVS Plasma Prize (2018)
- American Institute of Chemical Engineers (AIChE) Fellow (2021)
- American Association for the Advancement of Science
