= Elena Galoppini =

Italian chemist

- Education: University of Chicago; University of Pisa
- Scientific career
- Workplaces: Rutgers University-Newark; University of Texas Austin
- Thesis: Alkynylcubanes and new rigid-rod molecules (1994)

Elena Galoppini is an Italian chemist who is a professor at Rutgers University–Newark. Her research considers the development of redox- and photo-active molecules to modify surfaces.

== Early life and education ==
Galoppini was born in Italy, where she studied chemistry at the University of Pisa. She moved to the University of Chicago for her graduate studies, where she studied alkynylcubanes and rigid-rod molecules. Galoppini then moved to the University of Texas at Austin to work with Marye Anne Fox.

== Research and career ==
Galoppini started her independent career at the Rutgers University–Newark in 1996 where she directed the graduate program from 2015. Her research looks to enhance semiconductor and metal surfaces through photo-active and redox-active molecules.

Functionally Active Linkers and molecules that serve as connectors between the photoactive segments and the surface. They typically involve dyes that are bound to the surface through anchoring groups, creating donor-acceptor systems. Not only do they attach the photoactive part, but they also possess intrinsic properties that influence electronic reactions at the interface. Galoppini showed it was possible to hold the dyes at fixed distances from the semiconductor surface through careful linker design.

Chromophores within molecular hosts fosters interfacial host-guest chemistry that can demonstrate novel functional properties, including modified electron recombination dynamics.

In 2019, Galoppini was awarded the Rutgers Board of Trustees Award for Excellence in Research. She was appointed Deputy Editor of American Chemical Society Applied Optical Materials in 2022.

== Selected publications ==
- Elena Galoppini; Jonathan Rochford; Hanhong Chen; Gaurav Saraf; Yicheng Lu; Anders Hagfeldt; Gerrit Boschloo (August 2006). "Fast Electron Transport in Metal Organic Vapor Deposition Grown Dye-sensitized ZnO Nanorod Solar Cells". The Journal of Physical Chemistry B. 110 (33): 16159–16161. doi:10.1021/jp062865q. ISSN 1520-6106. PMID 16913732. Wikidata Q58414964.
- Jonathan Rochford; Dorothy Chu; Anders Hagfeldt; Elena Galoppini (27 March 2007). "Tetrachelate porphyrin chromophores for metal oxide semiconductor sensitization: effect of the spacer length and anchoring group position". Journal of the American Chemical Society. 129 (15): 4655–4665. doi:10.1021/ja068218u. ISSN 0002-7863. PMID 17385856. Wikidata Q51038616.
- Jean-Hugues Fournier; Thierry Maris; James D Wuest; Wenzhuo Guo; Elena Galoppini (1 January 2003). "Molecular tectonics. Use of the hydrogen bonding of boronic acids to direct supramolecular construction". Journal of the American Chemical Society. 125 (4): 1002–1006. doi:10.1021/ja0276772. ISSN 0002-7863. PMID 12537499. Wikidata Q44284645.
