= Teresa Kowalska =

Polish chemist (1946–2023)

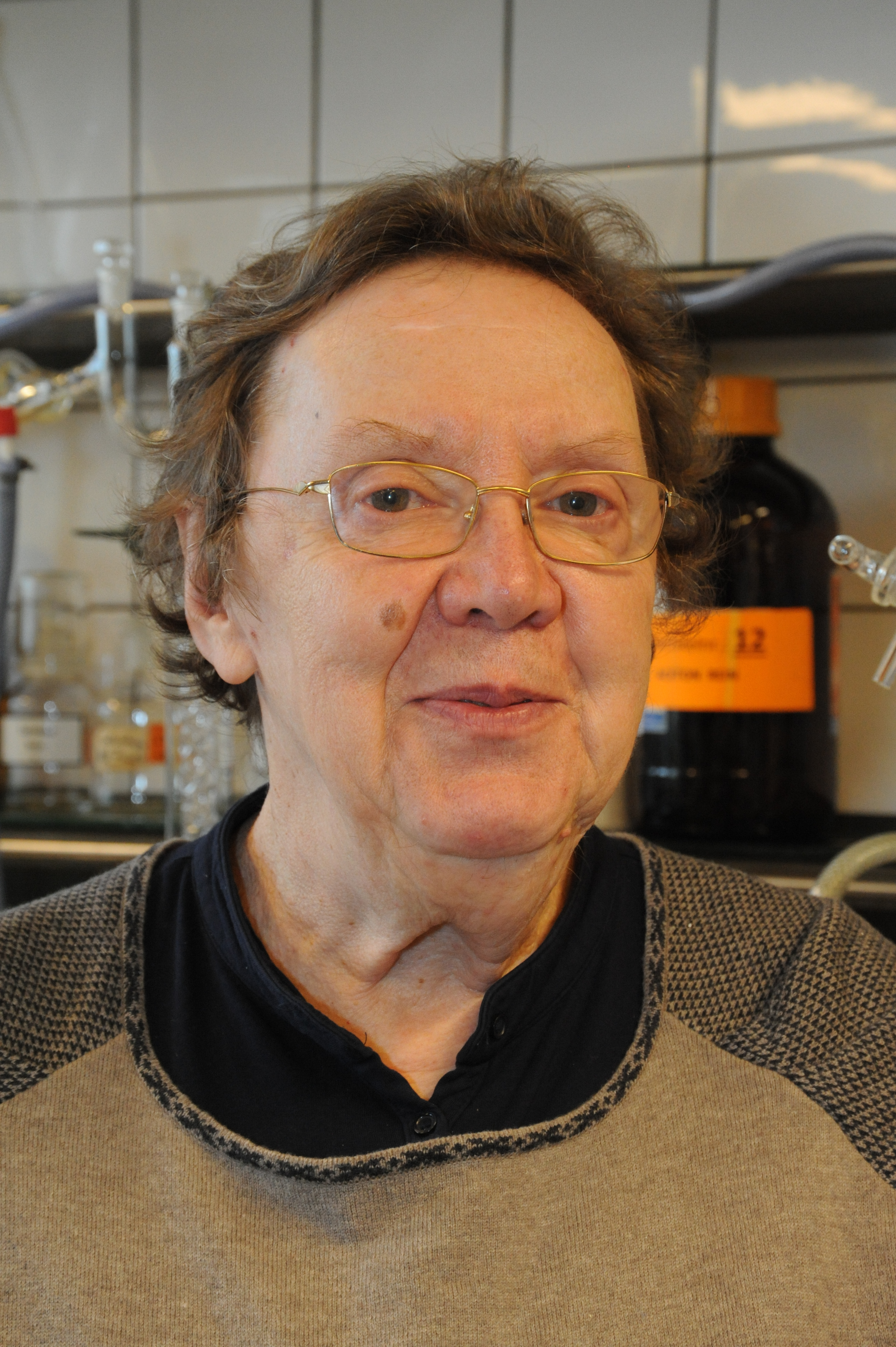
- Teresa Kowalska
- Born: 19 July 1946
- Died: 2023 (aged 76–77)
- Education: University of Silesia in Katowice; Maria Curie-Skłodowska University
- Known for: Chromatography
- Scientific career
- Fields: Chemistry
- Workplaces: University of Silesia in Katowice
- Thesis: A New Thermodynamic Model of the Chromatographic Process and its Applications

Teresa Kowalska (19 July 1946 – 2023) was a Polish chemist, specialized in the theory and application of chromatography. She was a professor emeritus of University of Silesia in Katowice.

== Education ==
Kowalska received a master's degree in chemistry in 1968 and a PhD in physical chemistry in 1972, both from Higher Pedagogical School in Katowice, which became University of Silesia in Katowice. She conducted post-doctoral research at University of Salford in the UK, under the supervision of Hans Suschitzky. She received a habilitation degree in 1988 from Maria Curie-Skłodowska University, with the habilitation dissertation titled A New Thermodynamic Model of the Chromatographic Process and its Applications.

== Career ==
Kowalska was professor emeritus at the Institute of Chemistry of University of Silesia in Katowice, where she began her career in 1968 as assistant professor, associate professor (since 1991), and full professor (since 2000). From 2004, she headed the Department of Physicochemical Foundations of Chromatography at the Institute of Chemistry, which was renamed to the Department of General Chemistry and Chromatography in 2006.

Over her career, the research topics of Kowalska focused on chromatography. She co-authored over 300 peer-reviewed publications on the topic and co-edited five chromatography books: Preparative Layer Chromatography (2006), Thin Layer Chromatography in Chiral Separations and Analysis (2007), Thin Layer Chromatography in Phytochemistry (2008), Planar Chromatography–Mass Spectrometry (2015), Chromatographic Techniques in the Forensic Analysis of Designer Drugs (2018). In 2017, the International Symposium for High-Performance Thin-Layer Chromatography called her "the First Lady of chiral TLC (Thin Layer Chromatography)/HPTLC (High Performance Thin Layer Chromatography)".

To address the lack of comprehensive chromatographic journals, Kowalska founded Acta Chromatographica with Józef Śliwiok in 1992. In addition to Acta Chromatographica, she also served on the editorial boards of Journal of Planar Chromatography and Chromatography Research International.
