= Jean Youatt =

Australian biochemist

- Born: 13 March 1925; China
- Died: 20 September 2017 (aged 92)
- Education: B.Sc. - University of Melbourne Ph.D. - Leeds University
- Scientific career
- Fields: Chemistry
- Workplaces: University of Melbourne (1955-1962) Monash University (1962 - )
- Thesis: (1954)

Jean Beatrice Youatt (13 March 1925 – 20 September 2017) was an Australian biochemist.

== Early life ==
Jean Youatt was born in China in 1925 where her parents were missionaries. Her father was Australian and her mother was British. After visiting Australia several times, she and her family moved back to Australia from 1929 to 1937. Due to travels, she attended many different schools growing up. She began to be interested in science at the age of seven or eight when someone from the Victorian museum taught her about fossils, and her parents always encouraged her in her pursuit of science education. Her education was interrupted when the family was interned by the Japanese while back in China in 1941.

== Education ==
Jean graduated from the University of Melbourne in 1949 with a Bachelor of Science degree in chemistry and microbiology. She asked Professor Victor Trikojus if she could enrol in a master's degree in biochemistry, but he told her she had to stay in microbiology. She completed her master's degree in microbiology at the same university, while working with Vic Skerman on the effects of oxygen on anaerobes. Because she could not get a Ph.D. in Australia at the time, she traveled to the United Kingdom and Leeds University, where she worked under Howard Rogers and Professor Haphold. She finished her Ph.D. there in 1954, doing research on an autotrophic organism that breaks down thiocyanate.

== Career ==
Jean began working as a chemistry lecturer at Monash University in 1962 and continued her work there until 1990 when she retired. Her early work was studying the tuberculosis drug, isoniazid, and how it worked. After visiting Seattle in 1968 and attending an International Botany Congress, she was introduced to the fungi allomyces, which she continued to focus on for the majority of her subsequent research. She was particularly interested in how the chemical environment of the fungi affected its development and uncovered some controversial work regarding fungi cell growth cycles. She has 41 publications and hundreds of citations. Even after her retirement in 1990, she continued to contribute to Monash University in the Department of Ecology and Evolutionary Biology.
