= Jenara Vicenta Arnal Yarza =

First woman Ph.D. in Chemistry from Spain

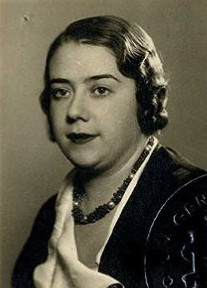
- Jenara Vicenta Arnal Yarza in 1937
- Born: September 19, 1902; Zaragoza, Spain
- Died: May 27, 1960 (aged 57); Madrid, Spain
- Education: University of Zaragoza
- Known for: First woman Ph.D. in Chemistry in Spain

Jenara Vicenta Arnal Yarza (September 19, 1902 – May 27, 1960), was the first woman to hold a Ph.D. in chemistry (Chemical Sciences) in Spain. She was noted for her work in electrochemistry and her research into the formation of fluorine from potassium biflouride. In later years, she was recognized for her contribution to the pedagogy of teaching science on the elementary and secondary levels, with a focus on the practical uses of chemistry in daily life. She was awarded a national honor, the Orden Civil de Alfonso X el Sabio.

== Early life and education ==
Born into a humble family, Arnal Yarza's father was Luis Arnal Foz, a laborer from Zaragoza who later repaired pianos. Her mother, Vicenta Yarza Marquina, of Brea (Zaragoza), was a housewife. After the death of her parents, she had the responsibility of taking care of her two younger siblings. Her sister Pilar was a pianist who studied in Paris and gave concerts in the Teatro Real de Madrid. Her brother Pablo died young, but had a short career as a professor of Physics and Chemistry at the Consejo Superior de Investigaciones Científicas (CSIC).

Jenara's vocation lead her to her teacher training studies at the Escuela de Zaragoza and to a degree in Elementary Education (primary school teaching) on December 3, 1921. Her desire for learning impelled her to continue her studies at the School of Sciences at the University of Zaragoza in the realm of Chemical Sciences, first as a non-matriculated student in 1922–23. Later she continued her studies as a matriculated student, and received high grades and honors in all of her classes. She received her graduate degree from the University of Zaragoza on March 12, 1927.

She defended her doctoral thesis on October 6, 1929, and obtained her Ph.D. in chemistry from the Faculty of Sciences of the University of Zaragoza on December 13, 1929. Her doctoral thesis was titled Estudio potenciométrico del ácido hipocloroso y de sus sales ("Potentiometric study of hypochlorous acid and its salts ”). Thus, Arnal Yarza became the first woman to obtain a doctorate in Chemical Sciences in Spain, later followed by the researchers Ángela García de la Puerta y María Antonia Zorraquino.

== Career in chemistry ==
After completing her studies, in 1926 she began work as a researcher in theoretical Chemistry in the laboratories of the Faculty of the University of Zaragoza. Her research would later take her to other public and private research centers, such as the Escuela Industrial of Zaragoza, the Escuela Superior de Trabajo of Madrid, the Anstalt für Anorganische Chemie of the University of Basel (as a fellowship recipient of the Junta para Ampliación de Estudios e Investigaciones Científicas), and the National Institute of Physics and Chemistry (Instituto Nacional de Física y Química) of Madrid in the electrochemistry department (continuing and expanding upon the works she began in Switzerland and Germany, where she had gone to research electrochemistry as a fellow of the JAE). During her tenure at the INFQ, she published 11 articles about electrochemical research, and in particular, electrolytic analysis.

In 1929, Dr. Arnal Yarza became a member of the Spanish Society for Physics and Chemistry (Real Sociedad Española de Física y Química) for her distinguished research career in Spain and abroad.

While she worked at the laboratories of the Anstalt für anorganische Chemie in Basel, she studied under Friedrich Fichter, professor of inorganic chemistry and then vice-president of the International Union of Chemistry. Together they worked on the chemical oxidation of various metals, but specifically the creation of fluorine and of persulfates of zinc and lanthanum from the electrolysis of molten potassium biflouride. They published the results of their work in 1931 in the notable Swiss periodical Helvetica Chimica Acta. Arnal Yarza also researched chemical oxidation produced by the action of fluorine in gaseous states. She spent some time studying in the Technische Hochschule in Dresden thanks to a two-semester extension of her original scholarship from 1932.

After the Spanish Civil War began in Madrid, in 1937 Arnal Yarza left Spain and resided for a time in France. She later returned to the Spanish "National Zone" (zona sublevada). Throughout the war she was able to continue her research work without being sanctioned.

During the Spanish Civil War and the early years of Franco's dictatorship, very few women, all unmarried, were allowed to participate in scientific research. While Jenara did not return to full-time research after the war, while teaching secondary school she continued to be interested in science and completed various works for the Consejo Superior de Investigaciones Científicas (CSIC), while she served at the teaching institute Instituto de Pedagogía San José de Calasanz. She collaborated in writing for the Boletín Bibliográfico del CSIC journal, most notably in publications dedicated to primary school teachers published by of the Auxiliary Library of Education (Biblioteca Auxiliar de Educación).

She was the second woman to serve as the director of a department of physics and chemistry at a Spanish secondary school from 1930 onward.

In May 1947 Arnal Yarza obtained authorization to travel to London to attend the First Centennial of the Royal Society and the XI International Congress of Pure and Applied Chemistry. In December, the General Office of Secondary Education (Dirección General de Enseñanzas Medias) gave her permission to go on a trip to Japan as a delegate of the (Foreign) Exchange Section of CSIC. Upon her return to Spain, Arnal Yarza gave conferences and facilitated the exchange of publications by CSIC with Japanese universities and centers of advanced research. Later, she would return to Japan under the auspices of the CSIC for two years where she would advance her studies in chemistry.

In July 1953, she made a trip to attend the XIII International Congress of Pure and Applied Chemistry in Stockholm and Uppsala. That same year she began her last trip to Europe for research purposes, to attend the meeting of the International Committee of Electrochemical Thermodynamics and Kinetics in Vienna from September 28 to October 5, 1953.

Jenara Vicenta Arnal Yarza died suddenly on May 27, 1960, of a cerebral hemorrhage due to thrombosis. After her death, the Ministry of Education awarded her the distinguished honor of the Orden Civil de Alfonso X el Sabio.

== Career in teaching ==
Arza Yarnal began her career trajectory as a teacher in 1926, working as an assistant instructor in practical classes with the goal of being a professor of Analytical Chemistry in the Faculty of Sciences of the University of Zaragoza, and worked there until 1927. At the time she was in charge of the first course of Inorganic Chemistry, as the director was on leave at the time. In the same year she obtained a contract as a temporary assistant to the professor of Electrochemistry and Advanced Physics in the same faculty, which she held until 1930. On April 9, 1930, after passing the requirements for professorship, she became the eleventh Spanish woman to receive the title of professor and the second professor of sciences, after Ángela García de la Puerta. Thus she began her career in secondary education.

Her first secondary teaching post was at the Instituto Nacional Femenino Infanta Cristina, a girls' school in Barcelona, from 1930 until its closure in 1931, where she served as acting professor. In 1933 she was transferred to the Institute of Secondary Education in Calatayud. Later she was a professor of Physics and Chemistry in the Institute of Bilbao, from which she finally transferred to Madrid where she was assigned to the Instituto Velázquez from 1935 to 1936.

When the Spanish Civil War broke out, the Republican government maintained her as a government employee, earning two-thirds of her salary, at the same time that there was a reduction of personnel at the Ministry of Public Instruction. Arza Yarnal did not have any political inclinations towards either of the two sides. This stance allowed her not to suffer any reprisals and permitted her to leave Madrid, and after a time in France, to enter the National Zone, where she presented herself before the Commission of Culture and Teaching of the Junta Técnica del Estado, which reinstated her to her position in Bilbao. In 1940, she was readmitted as a professor for the Beatriz Galindo Institute in Madrid without any sanctions, and there she was able to continue her duties in the directorial team of the center until her untimely death in 1960.

As an educator, Jenara distinguished herself with her pedagogical approach to the teaching of Natural Sciences, Physics and Chemistry. She believed that the teaching of basic sciences fomented cultural development in students, by providing knowledge of the natural world while developing their mental discipline via observation, experimentation and the interpretation of results. She believed that the method of teaching science should be adapted to the cognitive level of the student, so that for elementary students of 5–12 years of age, the focus should be on experiencing science via observation, experimentation and discovery. For older students of 12–15 years of age, she emphasized lessons that contained practical applications for science as part of professional development or for recreation. She detailed these approaches in a 1933 monograph edition of the journal Bordón, which was dedicated to the teaching of Natural Sciences.

== Publications ==
In 1930, Arza Yarnal completed research in collaboration with Antonio Rius Miró and Ángela García de la Puerta on the subject of electrolytic oxidation of chlorides. In addition, she published distinguished works in the journal Helvética Chimica Acta and Transactions of the American Chemical Society. Also with Rius Miró, she published “Estudio del potencial del electrodo de cloro y sus aplicaciones al análisis”, in the Anales de la Sociedad Española de Física y Química in 1933, and “La oxidación electrolítica” in 1935.

She also authored additional educational publications:

- Física y Química de la vida diaria ("Physics and Chemistry in daily life") (1954 and 1959)
- Los primeros pasos en el laboratorio de Física y Química ("First steps in Physics and Chemistry labs") (1956)
- Química en Acción ("Chemistry in action") (1959).

In addition, Jenara collaborated with Inés García Escalera, professor of the Institute of Secondary Education of Alcalá de Henares, on two books:

- Lecciones de cosas ("Lessons about things") (1958)
- El mundo del saber (ciencias y letras) ("The world of knowledge (Arts and Sciences)) (1968 and 1970), later re-edited in 1982.

She also translated specialized books about the history of science such as Historia de la Química ("The History of chemistry"), by Karl Hugo Friedrich Bauer and Historia de la Física ("The History of Physics"), by Adolf Kistner.

== Legacy ==
One of her former students from her time in Japan, the Spanish ambassador Gonzalo de Ojeda y Brooke created the Vicenta Arnal Prize in her honor for graduating students of the Instituto Beatriz Galindo, and in recent years his son Jaime de Ojeda y Eiseley has continued to award the prize.

In March 2019, the city of Zaragoza proposed changing the name of a street from Calle Rudesindo Nasarre Ariño to Calle Jenara Vicenta Arnal Yarza in her honor, in an effort to recognize the contributions of four notable women from that city and to comply with the Historical Memory Law. The plan was cancelled in September of that year. One of the low-current potentiostats at the Boettcher group is named after her contributions towards the field of electrochemistry.

== Bibliography ==
- Cien años de Política Científica en España. María Jesús Santesmases y Ana Romero de Pablos. Fundación BBVA 2008. 424 pages. (Spanish) ISBN 9788496515628
- De analfabetas científicas a catedráticas de Física y Química de Instituto en España: el esfuerzo de un grupo de mujeres para alcanzar un reconocimiento profesional y científico. Delgado Martínez, Mª Ángeles y López Martínez, J. Damián. Revista de Educación. 2004. Number 333. pp. 255–268. (Spanish)
- Pioneras españolas en las ciencias. Las mujeres del Instituto Nacional de Física y Química. Carmen Magallón Portolés. Editorial: Consejo Superior de Investigaciones Científicas. 2004. 408 pages. (Spanish) ISBN 978-84-00-07773-0
- Women in Their Element: Selected Women's Contributions To The Periodic System. Lykknes, Annette and Van Tiggelen, Brigitte. World Scientific Publishing Co. 2019. 556 pages. ISBN 9789811206283
