= Rommie Amaro =

American biophysicist

Rommie E. Amaro
- Born: Chicago
- Education: University of Illinois at Urbana-Champaign
- Awards: Presidential Early Career Award for Scientists and Engineers, 2010 San Diego 78th District Woman of the Year, 2015 ACS Kavli Emerging Leader in Chemistry National Lecturer, 2016 Corwin Hansch Award, Hansch-Fujita Society, 2016 ACM Gordon Bell Special Prize for COVID19, 2020
- Scientific career
- Fields: Computational biophysics
- Institutions: University of California, San Diego
- Thesis: Investigating the Structure and Function of IGP Synthase
- Doctoral advisor: Zaida Luthey-Schulten
- Website: amarolab.ucsd.edu

Rommie E. Amaro is a professor and endowed chair of chemistry and biochemistry and the director of the National Biomedical Computation Resource at the University of California, San Diego. Her research focuses on development of computational methods in biophysics for applications to drug discovery.

== Early life and education ==
Amaro grew up in Chicago and obtained her bachelor's degree in chemical engineering from the University of Illinois at Urbana-Champaign (UIUC) in 1999. She spent two years as a research engineer at Kraft Foods before returning to UIUC for graduate school; she received a Ph.D. in chemistry in 2005 for work with Zaida Luthey-Schulten on computational biophysics. During her graduate work, she also helped develop National Institutes of Health (NIH) Center for Macromolecular Modeling and Bioinformatics workshops. After graduation she became a postdoctoral fellow with Andrew McCammon at University of California, San Diego on an NIH Kirschstein-National Research Service Award (NRSA) postdoctoral fellowship.

== Academic career ==
Amaro joined the faculty at University of California, Irvine in 2009, with partial appointments in the departments of pharmaceutical sciences, computer science, and chemistry. She received an NIH Director's New Innovator Award in 2010 and the Presidential Early Career Award for Scientists and Engineers in 2010. She returned to UCSD in 2012 in the Department of Chemistry and Biochemistry. She was the director of UCSD's National Biomedical Computation Resource from 2014 to 2020. She served as co-director of the Drug Design Data Resource (D3R).

Amaro's work has emphasized the utility of GPU computing for methods development for molecular simulation. She was awarded a research grant by NVIDIA in 2013 to continue development for the CUDA platform.

Amaro is also active in public outreach and science communication; a high-school student she co-mentored won the 2013 Siemens Competition in Math, Science & Technology, the 2013 Google Science Fair, and the 2014 Intel Science Talent Search.

== Selected publications ==
1. Bohl TE, Ieong P, Lee JK, Lee T, Kankanala J, Shi K, Demir Ö, Kurahashi K, Amaro RE, Wang Z, Aihara H "The substrate-binding cap of the UDP-diacylglucosamine pyrophosphatase LpxH is highly flexible, enabling facile substrate binding and product release.", J Biol Chem, 2018, Vol. 293, Issue 21, 7969-798
2. Gaieb Z, Liu S, Gathiaka S, Chiu M, Yang H, Shao C, Feher VA, Walters WP, Kuhn B, Rudolph MG, Burley SK, Gilson MK, Amaro RE "D3R Grand Challenge 2: blind prediction of protein-ligand poses, affinity rankings, and relative binding free energies.", J Comput Aided Mol Des, 2018, Vol. 32, Issue 1, 1-20
3. Jagger BR, Lee CT, Amaro RE "Quantitative Ranking of Ligand Binding Kinetics with a Multiscale Milestoning Simulation Approach.", J Phys Chem Lett, 2018, Vol. 9, Issue 17, 4941-4948
4. Mulero MC, Shahabi S, Ko MS, Schiffer JM, Huang DB, Wang VY, Amaro RE, Huxford T, Ghosh G "Protein Cofactors Are Essential for High-Affinity DNA Binding by the Nuclear Factor κB RelA Subunit.", Biochemistry, 2018, Vol. 57, Issue 20, 2943–2957
5. Salamango DJ, Becker JT, McCann JL, Cheng AZ, Demir Ö, Amaro RE, Brown WL, Shaban NM, Harris RS "APOBEC3H Subcellular Localization Determinants Define Zipcode for Targeting HIV-1 for Restriction.", Mol Cell Biol, 2018
6. Salamango DJ, McCann JL, Demir Ö, Brown WL, Amaro RE, Harris RS "APOBEC3B Nuclear Localization Requires Two Distinct N-Terminal Domain Surfaces.", J Mol Biol, 2018, Vol. 430, Issue 17, 2695–2708
7. Richards C, Albin JS, Demir Ö, Shaban NM, Luengas EM, Land AM, Anderson BD, Holten JR, Anderson JS, Harki DA, Amaro RE, Harris RS "The Binding Interface between Human APOBEC3F and HIV-1 Vif Elucidated by Genetic and Computational Approaches.", Cell Rep, 2015, Vol. 13, Issue 9, 1781-8
8. Robert D. Malmstrom, Alexandr P. Kornev, Susan S. Taylor & Rommie E. Amaro "Allostery through the computational microscope: cAMP activation of a canonical signalling domain", Nature Communications, 2015, Vol. 6, 8588
