= Corine Mathonière =

French chemist (born 1968)

- Born: 3 May 1968 (age 58); Montluçon
- Education: Paris-Sud University; University of Bordeaux 1
- Scientific career
- Workplaces: University of Bordeaux
- Thesis: Optical Spectroscopy in polynuclear compounds: complementarity with magnetic properties (1993)

Corine Mathonière (born 3 May 1968) is a French chemist and Professor at the University of Bordeaux. She is part of the Molecular Materials and Magnetism team, who look to use modular molecular materials to assemble into various architectures. She was appointed to the Ordre des Palmes académiques in 2010.

== Early life and education ==
Mathonière was born in Montluçon. She attended Paris-Sud University, where she majored in chemistry. Her doctorate involved using optical spectroscopy to understand polynuclear compounds, and comparing light–matter interactions with their quantum properties. She moved to the Royal Institution where she worked alongside Peter Day on iron(III) compounds. Her research considered the development of new bimetallic compounds with novel magnetic properties. She identified a family or iron(III) compounds that comprise two-dimensional honeycomb networks, some of which behaved as ferrimagnets and some of which exhibit antiferromagnetism.

== Research and career ==
In 1994 Mathonière was appointed to the University of Bordeaux as an associate professor. She completed her habilitation on photomagnetism by electron transfer in molecular compounds, and was promoted to full Professor in 2010. That year she was appointed a Chevalière dans l’Ordre des Palmes académiques.

Her research considers molecular magnetism, spin crossover molecules, and coordination chemistry.

== Select publications ==
- Corine Mathonière; Christopher J. Nuttall; Simon G. Carling; Peter Day (January 2007), Ferrimagnetic Mixed-Valency and Mixed-Metal Tris(oxalato)iron(III) Compounds: Synthesis, Structure, and Magnetism, pp. 469–474, doi:10.1142/9789812706836_0032, Wikidata Q58111718
- Juan-Manuel Herrera; Valérie Marvaud; Michel Verdaguer; Jérôme Marrot; Marguerite Kalisz; Corine Mathonière (1 October 2004). "Reversible photoinduced magnetic properties in the heptanuclear complex [Mo(IV)(CN)(2)(CN--CuL)(6)](8+): a photomagnetic high-spin molecule". Angewandte Chemie International Edition. 43 (41): 5468–5471. doi:10.1002/anie.200460387. ISSN 1433-7851. PMID 15372638. Wikidata Q80573947.
- Dongfeng Li; Rodolphe Clérac; Olivier Roubeau; Etienne Harté; Corine Mathonière; Rémy Le Bris; Stephen M Holmes (13 December 2007). "Magnetic and optical bistability driven by thermally and photoinduced intramolecular electron transfer in a molecular cobalt-iron prussian blue analogue". Journal of the American Chemical Society. 130 (1): 252–258. doi:10.1021/ja0757632. ISSN 0002-7863. PMID 18076169. Wikidata Q50462278.
