= John H. Seinfeld =

American scientist

- Born: August 3, 1942 (age 84); Elmira, New York
- Education: University of Rochester; Princeton University
- Scientific career
- Fields: Atmospheric Science/Chemical Engineering
- Workplaces: California Institute of Technology
- Doctoral advisor: Leon Lapidus
- Doctoral students: Sonia Kreidenweis, Lynn M. Russell

John Hersh Seinfeld (born August 3, 1942) is an American chemical engineer and pioneering expert in atmospheric science. His research on air pollution has influenced public policy, and he developed the first mathematical model of air quality, which has influenced air pollution tracking and research across the United States. He has spent his career at the California Institute of Technology, where he is currently the Louis E. Nohl Professor of Chemical Engineering.

== Education ==
Seinfeld grew up in Elmira, New York, and attended the University of Rochester, where he earned a B.S. in chemical engineering in 1964. He then went to Princeton University, where he received a Ph.D. in chemical engineering in 1967. His doctoral dissertation, entitled "Optimal control of distributed-parameter systems," was concerned with the theory of control and optimization of distributed-parameter systems, which are systems governed by partial differential equations.

== Career ==
Seinfeld joined Caltech as an assistant professor of chemical engineering in 1967. He originally continued his research in control theory, but soon became intrigued by the elevated level of smog in Los Angeles and shifted his research to investigate air pollution. At the time, atmospheric research relied on approaches like Gaussian plume models, and Seinfeld realized that his mathematical expertise could be applied to understand the underlying chemistry of the reactions occurring in the air. He then formed a research group, which formulated a chemical mechanism for ozone formation. In 1973 they developed the first large-scale urban air pollution model, which was applied to the Los Angeles basin. This work, published in three papers in the journal Atmospheric Environment, initiated a new field of scientific research devoted to the modeling of tropospheric pollution. The model also became the precursor for air pollution modeling that is now used nationwide by the U.S. Environmental Protection Agency.

Following this research, Seinfeld recognized that important information was missing in his understanding of pollution, and he began to focus on the formation and properties of aerosols. To conduct his research, he and his Caltech colleague Richard Flagan established a "smog chamber" at the university, with which they were able to conduct controlled studies of gasses and particulates found in the atmosphere. The chamber, the first of its kind, has since become standard in atmospheric science, and Seinfeld's research in this area is now considered fundamental to the understanding of aerosols and their role in air quality and climate.

Seinfeld served as chair of the Division of Chemical Engineering and Applied Science at Caltech from 1990 to 2000. He is the author of hundreds of peer-reviewed articles and numerous books, including Atmospheric Chemistry and Physics: From Air Pollution to Climate Change, which is considered a standard text in its field.

== Honors ==
- Curtis W. McGraw Research Award (1976)
- Allan P. Colburn Award of the American Institute of Chemical Engineers (1976)
- NASA Public Service Medal (1980)
- National Academy of Engineering, Elected Member (1982)
- William H. Walker Award of the American Institute of Chemical Engineers (1986)
- Japan Society for the Promotion of Science, Elected Fellow (1986)
- George Westinghouse Award of the American Society for Engineering Education (1987)
- Distinguished Alumnus Award, University of Rochester (1989)
- American Academy of Arts and Sciences, Elected Member (1991)
- American Chemical Society Award for Creative Advances in Environmental Science and Technology (1993)
- Fuchs Memorial Award (1998)
- American Association for the Advancement of Science, Elected Fellow (1999)
- Warren K. Lewis Award of the American Institute of Chemical Engineers (2000)
- Nevada Medal (2001)
- Honorary Doctorate, Carnegie Mellon University (2002)
- Haagen-Smit Clean Air Award of the California Air Resources Board (2003)
- Aurel Stodola Medal (2008)
- Honorary Doctorate, Clarkson University (2009)
- Tyler Prize for Environmental Achievement (2012)
- National Academy of Sciences, Elected Member (2013)
