= Lynn M. Russell =

Atmospheric chemist

Lynne M. Russell
- Education: California Institute of Technology
- Scientific career
- Thesis: The physics and chemistry of marine aerosols (1995)
- Doctoral advisor: John H. Seinfeld

Lynn Russell is a professor of atmospheric chemistry at the Scripps Institute of Oceanography a division of the University of California, San Diego in La Jolla, California.

== Education and career ==
Russell has a B.S. in chemical engineering and an A.B. in international relations from Stanford University. She earned a Ph.D. in chemical engineering from California Institute of Technology in 1995. She was a postdoctoral investigator at the National Center for Atmospheric Research (NCAR). From 1997 to 2003, Russell was on the faculty at Princeton University; she unsuccessfully sued the trustees of Princeton for sex discrimination after her 2002 tenure application was denied. Russell moved to Scripps Institute of Oceanography in 2003.

In 2017, Russell was appointed a Fellow of the American Geophysical Union for "pioneering contributions to the fundamental science of organic aerosols through innovative theory, instrumentation, measurements, and modeling".

== Research ==
Russell's research is on how particles in the atmosphere effect climate, particularly aerosols from pollution sources such as automobiles. While Russell was at Princeton she developed the use of remote-controlled aircraft to collect atmospheric data. She has examined the factors controlling the production of organic aerosol particles in the atmosphere and the impact of aerosols on global warming. Russell's research has defined the composition of organic compounds in atmospheric aerosols and linked the presence of aerosol particles in the atmosphere to the underlying seawater.

Russell has examined dust particles at multiple locations. Yang Yang and Russell used the Community Earth System Model to study aerosols above eastern China and observed that variability in the dust particles impacted the level of haze in the region. Within the United States, Russell has tracked aerosol particles from Las Vegas, Nevada into California. Russell has also demonstrated the feasibility of using biofuels during research cruises by replacing the diesel fuel with biofuel on the research vessel R.V. Robert Gordon Sproul and examining the resulting production of NO_{x} compounds, particulate material, and hydroxy radicals.

=== Selected publications ===
- Russell, Lynn M.; Maria, Steven F.; Myneni, Satish C. B. (15 August 2002). "Mapping organic coatings on atmospheric particles: MAPPING ORGANIC PARTICLES". Geophysical Research Letters. 29 (16): 26–1–26-4. Bibcode:2002GeoRL..29.1779R. doi:10.1029/2002GL014874. S2CID 13879872.
- Russell, Lynn M. (July 2003). "Aerosol Organic-Mass-to-Organic-Carbon Ratio Measurements". Environmental Science & Technology. 37 (13): 2982–2987. Bibcode:2003EnST...37.2982R. doi:10.1021/es026123w. PMID 12875404.
- Maria, S. F. (10 December 2004). "Organic Aerosol Growth Mechanisms and Their Climate-Forcing Implications". Science. 306 (5703): 1921–1924. Bibcode:2004Sci...306.1921M. doi:10.1126/science.1103491. PMID 15591199. S2CID 11862432.
- Russell, L. M.; Hawkins, L. N.; Frossard, A. A.; Quinn, P. K.; Bates, T. S. (13 April 2010). "Carbohydrate-like composition of submicron atmospheric particles and their production from ocean bubble bursting". Proceedings of the National Academy of Sciences. 107 (15): 6652–6657. doi:10.1073/pnas.0908905107. PMC 2872374. PMID 20080571.
- Russell, Lynn M.; Bahadur, Ranjit; Ziemann, Paul J. (1 March 2011). "Identifying organic aerosol sources by comparing functional group composition in chamber and atmospheric particles". Proceedings of the National Academy of Sciences. 108 (9): 3516–3521. Bibcode:2011PNAS..108.3516R. doi:10.1073/pnas.1006461108. PMC 3048156. PMID 21317360.

== Awards and honors ==
- Innovator under 35, MIT Technology Review (1999)
- Kenneth T. Whitby Award, American Association for Aerosol Research (2003)
- Fellow, American Association for Aerosol Research (2013)
- Fellow, American Geophysical Union (2017)
