= Martha J. B. Thomas =

American chemical engineer

- Born: Martha Jane Bergin; March 13, 1926
- Died: October 16, 2006 (aged 80)
- Education: Radcliffe College (BS 1945), Boston University (Ph.D. 1953)
- Occupation: Chemical engineer
- Known for: Phosphor chemistry for improving lighting technology and manufacturing
- Spouse: George R. Thomas
- Children: 4
- Engineering career
- Discipline: Chemistry
- Employer: Sylvania Electric
- Significant design: White phosphorus powder coating for fluorescent tubes creating a more natural daylight-like light
- Significant advance: Lighting technology and manufacturing (35 patents)
- Awards: Achievement Award Society of Women Engineers

Martha J. B. Thomas (13 March 1926 – 16 October 2006) was an American chemical engineer and analytical chemist. She is known for her work on phosphorus, which made early fluorescent lighting more commercially viable by balancing the color to a natural white. Her research also scaled phosphor production to the plant level which impacted many other phosphor technologies including early color television and anything labeled "glow in the dark". Thomas was named a Fellow of the American Institute of Chemists.

== Life and education ==
Martha Jane Bergin was born in West Roxbury, Boston, on 13 March 1926 to Augusta and John Bergin. As a child she attended Girls Latin School. She graduated cum laude from Radcliffe College in 1945 with a Bachelor of Science degree, after which she obtained a PhD in chemistry from Boston University (Sigma Xi) in 1953, while working at Sylvania Electric Products. Later in life, she received an MBA at Boston's Northeastern University in 1983.

== Career and research ==
Thomas began her professional career in 1945 at Sylvania Electric Products, later GTE Sylvania, where she became the head of the Phosphor Research and Development Section in 1970. During her time at Sylvania she established their first phosphor pilot plants. She was a director of technical services at GTE Electrical Products Group in Danvers, Massachusetts, US, working for the company for over four decades. During that time she made "23 official improvements in lightbulbs".

Thomas held 22 U.S. patents and 13 foreign patents for improving lighting technology and manufacturing, covering, for example, fluorescent lamps and phosphor chemistry. One significant contribution was the development of a white phosphorus powder coating for fluorescent tubes creating a much more daylight-like light. She also developed a phosphor-based treatment that increased the brightness of mercury lamps by 10%.

GTE Sylvania was a pioneer in early color television when the first commercially viable models debuted. Thomas's patent US3668140, a Process for Yttrium Orthovanadate Phosphors, showed that her research with phosphors extended beyond lightening and contributed to GTE Sylvania's 1964 color television which used an Europium Yttrium phosphor to improve the color red.

Thomas was an adjunct professor of chemistry at Boston University between 1952 and 1970. She was also an adjunct professor at the University of Rhode Island from 1974 - 1978.

== Awards, honors and memberships ==
Thomas was an active member in the American Chemical Society, holding several officer positions in her local section. She was a director of the American Institute of Chemists and published papers as a member of the Electrochemical Society. She was an active member and officer of the Society of Women Engineers (SWE), joining in 1951 during the organizations founding days. She was the Boston Section President.

In 1965, Thomas was awarded the Achievement Award of the Society of Women Engineers in recognition of her significant contributions to the science of chemistry as an engineer, educator, and administrator, while fulfilling her duties as a wife and mother.

In 1966, she received the Golden Plate Award as "Woman Engineer of the Year" in the category of Science and Exploration. Thomas is also listed in the American Men and Women of Science, making the list before 1971 when it was still called American Men of Science.

In 1969, Thomas was named a Fellow of the American Institute of Chemists.

In 1983, she was the recipient of a Distinguished Alumni Award from Boston University.

In 1991 she was named the New England Inventor by the Museum of Science in Boston, an award given to individuals whose application of science and technology, creativity, and independent thought has positively impacted society.

== Personal life ==
Martha Jane Bergin married George Thomas, a government scientist, at St Brigid's Church in Millbury on 29 October 1955 and they had four daughters, Augusta, Anne, Abigail and Susan.

On retirement in 1990, the couple moved to Westport, Massachusetts, and after her husband's death, Thomas moved to live with her daughter Susan's family in Royal Palm Beach Florida.

Martha J.B. Thomas died at her home on 16 Oct 2006 at the age of 80. Her funeral was held at St. Mary's Church Winchester, MA. She was buried in Holyhood Cemetery in Brighton Massachusetts.

== Additional reading ==
Aloia, Marie (2025). Chapter 18 "Martha J.B. Thomas". In Craig, Cecilia; Teig, Holly; Kimberling, Debra; Williams, Janet; Tietjen, Jill; Johnson, Vicki (eds.). Women Engineering Legends 1952-1976: Society of Women Engineers Achievement Award Recipients. Springer Cham. ISBN 978-3-032-00223-5
