= PXL065 =

Chemical compound

Clinical data
- Other names: DRX-065; d-R-pioglitazone

Identifiers
- IUPAC name: (5R)-5-Deuterio-5-[[4-[2-(5-ethylpyridin-2-yl)ethoxy]phenyl]methyl]-1,3-thiazolidine-2,4-dione
- CAS Number: 1259828-75-5
- PubChem CID: 49835993
- UNII: RQ8IV9N7OT

Chemical and physical data
- Formula: C_{19}H_{20}N_{2}O_{3}S
- Molar mass: 356.44 g·mol^{−1}
- 3D model (JSmol): Interactive image
- SMILES: [2H] [C@]1(C(=O)NC(=O)S1)CC2=CC=C(C=C2)OCCC3=NC=C(C=C3)CC
- InChI: InChI=1S/C19H20N2O3S/c1-2-13-3-6-15(20-12-13)9-10-24-16-7-4-14(5-8-16)11-17-18(22)21-19(23)25-17/h3-8,12,17H,2,9-11H2,1H3,(H,21,22,23)/t17-/m1/s1/i17D; Key:HYAFETHFCAUJAY-VHLRUQIKSA-N

PXL065 (d-R-pioglitazone) is a drug candidate for the treatment of nonalcoholic steatohepatitis (NASH). (Note: About the chemical formula: One of the hydrogens is deuterium, so a more precise formula is C_{19}H_{19}^{2}HN_{2}O_{3}S (IUPAC recommends that the chemical symbol for deuterium should be ^{2}H, rather than D).) It is the deuterium-stabilized (R)-enantiomer of pioglitazone which lacks PPARγ agonist activity and the associated side effects of weight gain and edema. PXL065 (formerly known as DRX-065) has demonstrated preclinical efficacy for both NASH and X-linked adrenoleukodystrophy (X-ALD). In 2022, it successfully completed a 9 month Phase 2 trial in biopsy-proven NASH patients where it met the primary endpoint for reduction in liver fat without weight gain or edema.

PXL065 was discovered and advanced to Phase 1 by DeuteRx, LLC using the strategy of deuterium-enabled chiral switching (DECS). In August 2018, PXL065 and a portfolio of deuterated thiazolidinediones (TZDs) was acquired by Poxel SA.
