= Condit (disambiguation) =

Condit is a surname. It may also refer to:

- Condit, Michigan, United States
- Condit, Ohio, United States, an unincorporated community
- Condit Hydroelectric Project, Washington, United States, a development
- Condit Glacier, Scott Coast, Antarctica
- conDiT, a former Argentine musical creation platform

== See also ==
- Condit House (disambiguation)
- Condit Crossing, Pennsylvania, United States, an unincorporated community
