= Daniel Bradley =

Daniel Bradley may refer to:

- Dan Bradley, American stunt coordinator
- Dan Bradley (geneticist), Northern Irish geneticist
- Danny Bradley (born 1963), American football player
- Daniel Joseph Bradley (1928–2010), Irish physicist
- Daniel Bradley (politician) (1833–1908), American politician from New York
- Daniel W. Bradley (born 1941), American virologist
- Daniel J. Bradley (born 1949/50), Canadian-American chemist and petroleum engineer
