= Margaret A. Tolbert =

American atmospheric chemist

- Education: California Institute of Technology; University of California; Grinnell College
- Known for: Atmospheric chemistry
- Spouse: Owen Toon
- Awards: Guggenheim Fellowship; Fellow of the American Geophysical Union; Member of the National Academy of Sciences; NASA Group Achievement Award; Newcomb Cleveland Prize
- Scientific career
- Workplaces: University of Colorado Boulder
- Thesis: Mechanisms and Energetics of Alkane Activation by Transition Metal Ions in the Gas Phase (1986)
- Doctoral advisor: Jesse L. Beauchamp
- Website: https://cires.colorado.edu/research-groups/margaret-tolbert-group

Margaret Anne Tolbert is an American atmospheric chemist, specializing in polar stratospheric clouds.

== Early life and education ==
Margaret Tolbert grew up in Boulder, Colorado. She is the daughter of Bert Mills Tolbert, a chemistry professor at University of Colorado Boulder, and sister of Elizabeth Tolbert, Caroline Tolbert, and Sarah Tolbert.

Tolbert received a bachelor degree from Grinnell College in 1979 and a master degree in chemistry from University of California in 1985. She received a PhD in chemistry from the California Institute of Technology in 1986, under the direction of Jesse L. Beauchamp. She completed post-doctoral research at Stanford Research Institute under the direction of David M. Golden.

== Career ==
Tolbert conducted research at Stanford Research Institute before joining the faculty of University of Colorado Boulder in 1991, teaching environmental chemistry courses to nonscience majors from 1992 to 2006. She was awarded Distinguished Professor in 2010. She is a Fellow and Associate Director of the Cooperative Institute for Research in Environmental Sciences, a joint venture between University of Colorado Boulder and National Oceanic and Atmospheric Administration.

Her research focuses on study of atmospheric chemistry, in particular polar stratospheric clouds and planetary atmospheres. She co-authored the book "Stratospheric Ozone Depletion" with Ann M. Middlebrook. She was featured in the book "I Want to be an Environmentalist".

== Awards and honors ==
- 2017 NASA Group Achievement Award, MSL Extended Mission Science
- 2009 American Chemical Society Creative Advances in Environmental Sciences and Technology Award
- 2007 Grinnell College honorary Doctor of Science
- 2007 University of Colorado Boulder Hazel Barnes Prize
- 2005 Guggenheim Fellowship
- 2004 National Academy of Sciences Elected Member
- 2003 NASA Group Achievement Award, Crystal-Face Science
- 2001 NASA Group Achievement Award, SOLVE Experiment
- 1994 Camille Dreyfus Teacher-Scholar Award for her project on "Atmospheric chemistry: heterogeneous reactions on polar stratospheric clouds and sulfuric acid aerosols"
- 1993 Fellow of the American Geophysical Union
- 1993 American Geophysical Union James B. Macelwane Medal
- 1992 National Science Foundation Young Investigator Award
- 1988 American Association for the Advancement of Science Newcomb Cleveland Prize for her first-authored article on "Reaction of Chlorine Nitrate with Hydrogen Chloride and Water at Antarctic Stratospheric Temperatures"
