= Augustyn =

Augustyn is both a surname and a given name. Notable people with the name

== Surname ==
- Błażej Augustyn (born 1988), Polish footballer
- Brian Augustyn (1954–2022), American comic book editor and writer
- Frank Augustyn (born 1953), Canadian ballet dancer
- Irena Lichnerowicz-Augustyn (born 1974), Polish civil servant, diplomat
- Joe Augustyn, American screenwriter, film producer, and author
- John-Lee Augustyn (born 1986), South African cyclist
- Marcjanna M Augustyn, Polish economist, Bournemouth University professor
- Urszula Augustyn (born 1964), Polish politician
- Veronica Augustyn, American materials scientist

== Given name ==
- Augustyn Bloch (1929–2006), Polish composer and organist
- Augustyn Józef Czartoryski (1907–1946), Polish noble
- Augustyn Kordecki (1603–1673), Polish religious leader
- Augustyn Mirys (1700–1790), Polish artist

== See also ==
- Hieronim Augustyn Lubomirski
