= Condit House (disambiguation) =

Condit House is the residence of the president of Indiana State University, in Terre Haute, Indiana, United States.

Condit House may also refer to:

- Cortland Condit House, Putman, Illinois
- Stephen Condit House, Parsippany, New Jersey
- Ward-Force House and Condit Family Cook House, Livingston, New Jersey
