= Owen Toon =

American academic (born 1947)

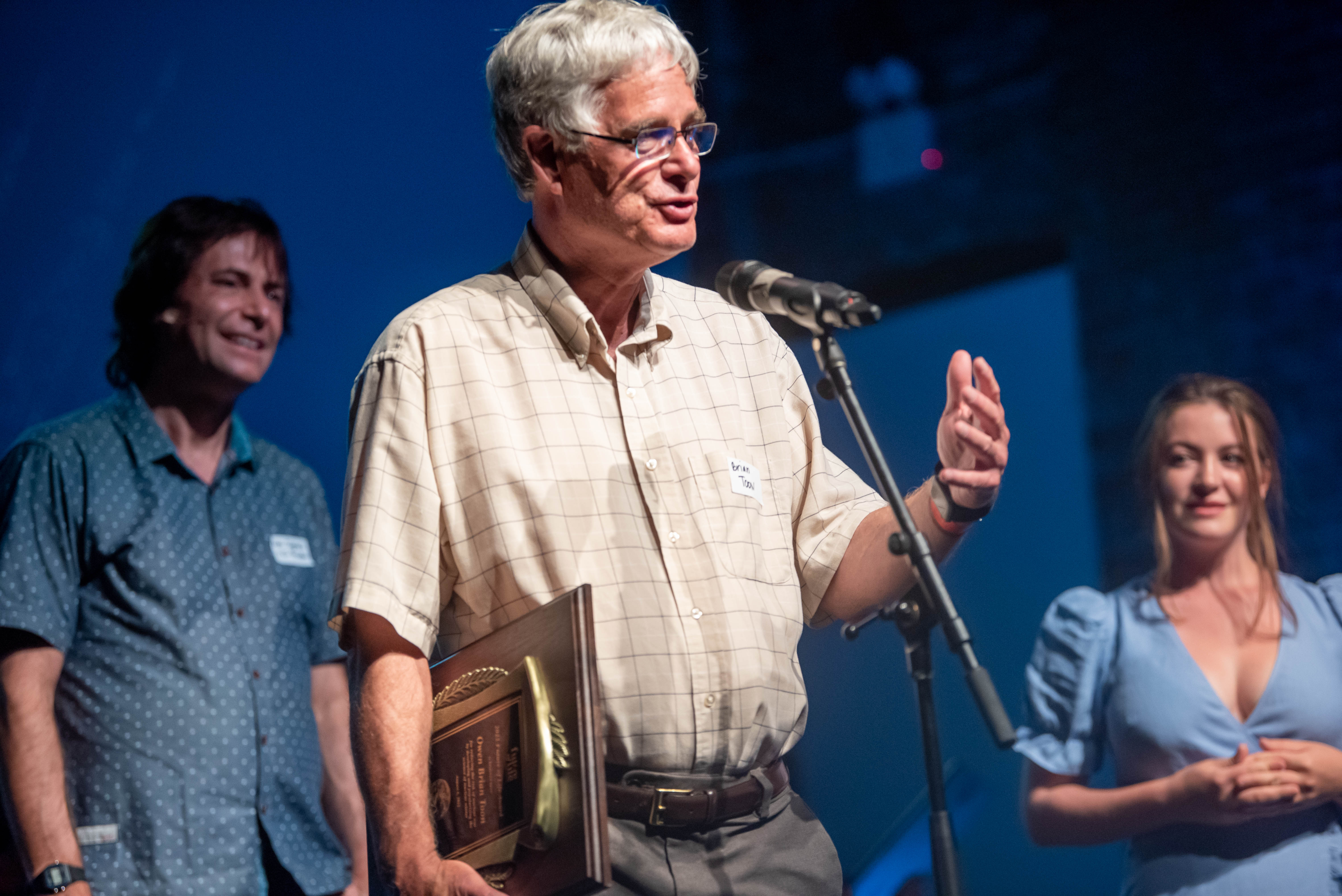
- Born: Owen Brian Toon; May 26, 1947 (age 79); Bethesda, Maryland, U.S.
- Education: University of California, Berkeley; Cornell University
- Spouse: Margaret A. Tolbert
- Awards: H. Julian Allen Award (1983, 1988); NASA Medal for Exceptional Scientific Achievement (1983, 1989); Arthur Flemming Award (1985); Leo Szilard Award for Physics in the Public Interest (1986); Robert L. Stearns Award (2009); Roger Revelle Medal (2011)
- Scientific career
- Fields: Aerosol science; atmospheric chemistry; atmospheric physics; cloud physics; planetary sciences
- Workplaces: NASA Ames Research Center; University of Colorado Boulder
- Thesis: Climatic change on the Earth and Mars (1975)
- Doctoral advisor: Carl Sagan

Owen Brian Toon (born May 26, 1947 in Bethesda, Maryland) is an American professor of atmospheric and oceanic sciences. He is a fellow at the Laboratory for Atmospheric and Space Physics (LASP) at the University of Colorado Boulder. He received an A.B. in physics at the University of California, Berkeley in 1969 and a Ph.D. in physics at Cornell University in 1975 under Carl Sagan. His research interests are in cloud physics, atmospheric chemistry, and radiative transfer. He also works on comparing Earth and other planets such as Venus.

His research on the asteroid impact that killed the dinosaurs led to the discovery of nuclear winter due to the major decrease in temperature. The effects of nuclear winter were re-examined in a 2006 presentation at the annual meeting of the American Geophysical Union in San Francisco, where Toon and colleagues found that even a regional nuclear war could prove deadly for a large number of people. They calculated that as few as fifty detonations of Hiroshima-size bombs could kill as many as twenty million people, although it would not produce a nuclear winter. The atmospheric effects of a regional nuclear war would last several years, and would be strongest at mid-latitudes, including the United States and Europe.

He was elected a fellow of the American Meteorological Society in 1990, and a fellow of the American Geophysical Union in 1992. He received the 2011 Roger Revelle Medal from the American Geophysical Union.

In 2022, Toon was among eight recipients of the 2022 Future of Life Award. The honor was bestowed upon Toon for "reducing the risk of nuclear war by developing and popularizing the science of nuclear winter."

== Selected publications ==
- Robertson DS, McKenna MC, Toon OB, et al. (2004). "Survival in the first hours of the Cenozoic". Geol. Soc. Am. Bull. 116 (5–6): 760–8. Bibcode:2004GSAB..116..760R. doi:10.1130/B25402.1. S2CID 44010682.
- Brooks SD, Toon OB, Tolbert MA, et al. (2004). "Polar stratospheric clouds during SOLVE/THESEO: Comparison of lidar observations with in situ measurements". J. Geophys. Res. 109 (D2): D02212. Bibcode:2004JGRD..109.2212B. doi:10.1029/2003JD003463.
- Colaprete A, Haberle RM, Toon OB (2003). "Formation of convective carbon dioxide clouds near the south pole of Mars". J. Geophys. Res. 108 (E7): 5081. Bibcode:2003JGRE..108.5081C. doi:10.1029/2003JE002053.
- Colarco PR, Toon OB, Reid JS, et al. (2003). "Saharan dust transport to the Caribbean during PRIDE: 2. Transport, vertical profiles, and deposition in simulations of in situ and remote sensing observations". J. Geophys. Res. 108 (D19): 8590. Bibcode:2003JGRD..108.8590C. doi:10.1029/2002JD002659.
- Toon OB (2003). "Atmospheric science - African dust in Florida clouds". Nature. 424 (6949): 623–624. Bibcode:2003Natur.424..623T. doi:10.1038/424623a. PMID 12904770. S2CID 4419364.
- Ackerman AS, Toon OB, Stevens DE, et al. (2003). "Enhancement of cloud cover and suppression of nocturnal drizzle in stratocumulus polluted by haze". Geophys. Res. Lett. 30 (7): 1381. Bibcode:2003GeoRL..30.1381A. doi:10.1029/2002GL016634. hdl:2060/20030000639. S2CID 51943867.
- Barth EL, Toon OB (2003). "Microphysical modeling of ethane ice clouds in Titan's atmosphere". Icarus. 162 (1): 94–113. Bibcode:2003Icar..162...94B. doi:10.1016/S0019-1035(02)00067-2.
