= Daniel J. Bradley =

Canadian-American university president

Daniel Joseph Bradley

11th President of Indiana State University
- In office July 31, 2008 – January 2, 2018
- Preceded by: Lloyd Benjamin
- Succeeded by: Deborah J. Curtis

12th President of Fairmont State University
- In office February 2001 – 2008
- Preceded by: Janet Dudley-Eshbach
- Succeeded by: Thomas Krepel

Personal details
- Born: 1949 or 1950 (age 76–77) Portage la Prairie, Manitoba, Canada
- Scientific career
- Education: Montana College of Mineral Science and Technology (BS); University of Tulsa (MS); Michigan State University (PhD)
- Fields: Chemistry
- Workplaces: Montana Technological University; Fairmont State University; Indiana State University
- Thesis: The thermodynamics of carbon in nickel-based multicomponent solid solutions (1978)

Daniel Joseph Bradley is a Canadian-American university administrator, professor, chemist, and petroleum engineer. Since July 2008, he has served as president of Indiana State University. Before that, he served as president of Fairmont State University, beginning in February 2001. He was previously a professor at Montana Tech of the University of Montana where he held several ranking positions as department head, dean, and vice-chancellor.

Bradley's scientific research has focused on thermodynamics and the properties of electrolytes as well as other aqueous solutions. In 1979, he published a paper with Kenneth Pitzer describing the relative permittivity of water at specified ranges of temperature and pressure. It contained what has come to be known as the Bradley-Pitzer equation which has been frequently used by scientists to calculate the coefficients in the Debye–Hückel equation.

== Biography ==
=== Early life ===
Bradley was born in Portage la Prairie, Manitoba, Canada. When he was seven years old, his family moved to California. After serving in the United States Army, Bradley entered Michigan State University. In 1973, he graduated with a bachelor's degree in Physical Chemistry. He went on to pursue graduate school at the university, earning a doctorate in 1978.

=== Career ===
==== Postgraduate research ====
Bradley conducted postgraduate research at the University of California, Berkeley. It was from here that he and Kenneth Pitzer published the article in The Journal of Physical Chemistry entitled "Thermodynamics of electrolytes 12. Dielectric properties of water and Debye-Hueckel parameters to 350.degree.C and 1 kbar". This article published in 1979 contained what later came to be known as the Tait-Bradley-Pitzer or simply Bradley-Pitzer equation. The equation is "frequently used for the calculation of the Debye–Hückel slopes." It is a simple "but effective description of the dielectric constant dependence on the pressure and temperature" of water. It was derived by modifying the Tait equation, which was originally proposed by Peter Guthrie Tait to describe the relationship between the volume and the temperature and pressure of water. However, Bradley and Pitzer formulated an equation of the same form as Tait's that instead described the relationship between the relative permittivity (previously known as the dielectric constant) and the temperature and pressure of water.

==== Montana Tech ====
In 1979, Bradley became a faculty member of Montana College of Mineral Science and Technology, what later became known as Montana Tech and then Montana Tech of the University of Montana. Although a Ph.D. graduate already, he studied petroleum engineering at Montana Tech, earning a bachelor's in 1982. The following year, he obtained a master's degree in petroleum engineering from the University of Tulsa. In 1987, he became the director of the International Programs at Montana Tech, serving in the position until 1989. He then became the head of the Petroleum Department until 1991, at which time he became the dean of Engineering. He served as dean for seven years from 1991 to 1998. Bradley became Vice-Chancellor of Academic Affairs and Research, serving in that post from 1998 to 2001.

Since 1994, he has also served on the Accreditation Board for Engineering and Technology (ABET) as a member of the Engineering Accreditation Commission. On the ABET board, he represented the Society of Petroleum Engineers. Bradley was named a Fellow of ABET in 2010.

==== Fairmont State University ====
In February 2001, Bradley was appointed the president of Fairmont State University. During his tenure, he also served as chair of the ABET Board of Directors' Finance Committee. In May 2006, he was appointed treasurer of ABET.

At FSU, Bradley oversaw significant changes to both the university's academic programs and infrastructure. During his presidency, the university was involved in construction projects valued at more than $100 million. Bradley was responsible for implementing the university's first major fundraiser.

==== Indiana State University ====
On June 24, 2008, the board of trustees of Indiana State University announced plans to replace Lloyd Benjamin as president of the university located in Terre Haute, Indiana. Bradley would take over for Benjamin, who had resigned from the position after serving for eight years. Bradley became the 11th person to serve in the position since the school's founding in 1865. He began his duties in July and was officially installed as president of the ISU in November at a formal ceremony in Hulman Center.

In 2009, although former governor of Indiana Mitch Daniels had announced a decrease to the state's higher education budget, Bradley announced a "five-year plan that calls for growing [Indiana State’s] enrollment by 1,500 students, increasing graduation rates and even becoming more involved in the community." The plan called for an increase in the diversity of the university's revenue streams, as well as increasing enrollment, and tackling low retention and graduation rates. In 2010, Bradley was among the seventy-one college administrators to sign "a pledge to improve student learning." They were part of the Presidents' Alliance for Excellence in Student Learning and Accountability. In 2012, Bradley announced the new Sycamore Graduation Guarantee, which is intended to encourage on-time graduation with a guarantee that the university will pay a student's tuition for any time beyond the four years needed to graduate. In return, Indiana State students were required to sign a pledge to maintain a minimum of 32 credits per year, declare a major and meet regularly with advisers. In 2011, oil was discovered in Terre Haute. Two years later, Bradley celebrated a successful drilling effort on the university property by presenting jars full of crude oil to the school's Board of Trustees. In the first year of extraction, oil production had generated about $350,000 in revenue for the university.

By 2015 of Bradley's tenure, the university's enrollment rose to a record high of 13,584 students, remaining steady at 13,565 by 2016, and again reaching a record level of 13,771 in 2017, a significant increase from 10,500 students at the beginning of his term. ISU has also experienced gains in its four-year graduation rate. As recently as March 2017, Bradley argued against decreases in funding as proposed in the 2018–19 state budget by the Indiana General Assembly and advocated for a $4.7 million increase to improve student outcome. In June 2017, the $2.3 million per year increase was approved by the school's board of trustees as a line-item appropriation in the state budget. Bradley has overseen several university construction and renovation projects totaling more than $300 million, which includes a $64 million project to improve the facilities of the College of Health and Human Services.

In April 2017, Bradley announced he would be stepping down as president of the university. Although his contract was not due to expire until June 2019, he said the planned retirement was due to a desire to spend more time with his family and pursue other interests. His retirement became effective in January 2018 after serving as the Indiana State University president for almost a decade.

== Personal life ==
Bradley is married to Cheri Bradley. Together they have three sons and several grandchildren. The Bradleys lived on the university campus at Condit House. After Bradley's retirement as president of Indiana State, they plan to stay in California for a year, before returning to Indiana State to continue an association with the university in some form. They sometimes vacation in Montana where they owned a home. In January 2017, the two went with friends to visit Cuba, opting for "people to people" travel category permitted under the relaxed restrictions implemented by President Barack Obama.

== Selected journals ==
- Leitnaker, J. M.; Potter, G. A.; Bradley, D. J.; Franklin, J. C.; Laing, W. R. (1978-03-01). "The composition of eta carbide in hastelloy N after aging 10,000 h at 815°C". Metallurgical Transactions A. 9 (3): 397–400. Bibcode:1978MTA.....9..397L. doi:10.1007/BF02646390. ISSN 0360-2133. S2CID 137260162.
- Bradley, D. J. (1978-04-01). Theromdynamics of Carbon in Nickel-Based Multicomponent Solid Solutions (Ph. D. thesis). Michigan State University and Oak Ridge National Laboratory. doi:10.2172/5004927. OSTI 5004927.
- Bradley, Daniel J.; Pitzer, Kenneth S. (1979-06-01). "Thermodynamics of electrolytes. 12. Dielectric properties of water and Debye-Hueckel parameters to 350.degree.C and 1 kbar". The Journal of Physical Chemistry. 83 (12): 1599–1603. doi:10.1021/j100475a009. ISSN 0022-3654.
- Rogers, P. S. Z.; Bradley, Daniel J.; Pitzer, Kenneth S. (1982-01-01). "Densities of aqueous sodium chloride solutions from 75 to 200.degree.C at 20 bar". Journal of Chemical & Engineering Data. 27 (1): 47–50. doi:10.1021/je00027a014. ISSN 0021-9568.
- Bradley, Daniel Joseph (1983). The applicability of wettability alteration to naturally fractured reservoirs and imbibition waterflooding (M.S. thesis). University of Tulsa. OCLC 9995993.
- Barta, Leslie; Bradley, Daniel J. (1985-01-01). "Extension of the specific interaction model to include gas solubilities in high temperature brines". Geochimica et Cosmochimica Acta. 49 (1): 195–203. Bibcode:1985GeCoA..49..195B. doi:10.1016/0016-7037(85)90204-2.
- Simonson, J. M; Bradley, D. J; Busey, R. H (1987-05-01). "Excess molar enthalpies and the thermodynamics of (methanol + water) to 573 K and 40 MPa". The Journal of Chemical Thermodynamics. 19 (5): 479–492. doi:10.1016/0021-9614(87)90145-5.

Academic offices
Preceded by Janet Dudley-Eshbach	12th President of Fairmont State University; 2001 – 2008	Succeeded by Thomas Krepel
Preceded by Lloyd Benjamin	11th President of Indiana State University; 2008 – 2018	Succeeded by Deborah J. Curtis
