= Carolyn Ringer Lepre =

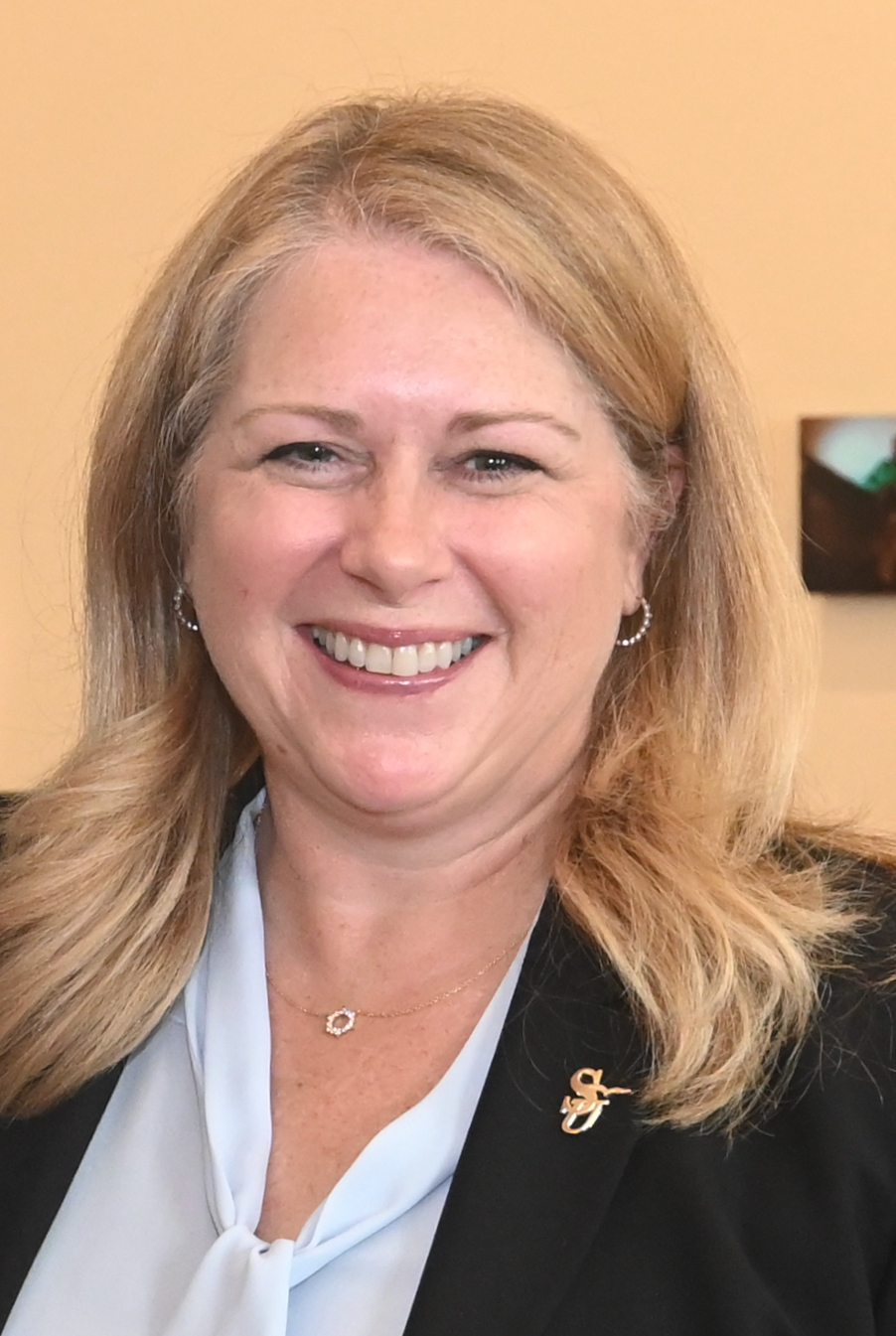
- Lepre in 2023

10th President of Salisbury University
- Incumbent
- Assumed office July 15, 2022
- Preceded by: Charles A. Wight

Personal details
- Born: Carolyn Hope Ringer Tarrytown, New York, U.S.
- Education: Miami University (BA); Ohio University (MS); University of Florida (PhD)

Carolyn Hope Ringer Lepre is an American mass communication professor and academic administrator serving as the tenth president of Salisbury University since 2022. She was previously the provost and interim president of Radford University.

== Life ==
Carolyn Hope Ringer was born in Tarrytown, New York to James M. and Jaquelyn H. Ringer. She earned a B.A. in English and journalism from Miami University in 1991. In 1993, she completed a M.S. in journalism from Ohio University. She worked as an editorial assistant for Modern Bride magazine and as an assistant editor of Martha Stewart Living. As a doctorate student, she instructed lab sections of the introductory media writing course. She received a Ph.D. in mass communication from the University of Florida. Her 2000 dissertation was titled, Effects of a Persuasive Communication on Undecided Undergraduate Students' Attitudes, Beliefs, and Intentions to Seek Career Counseling. Kim Walsh-Childers was her doctoral advisor.

After graduation, Lepre joined the department of journalism at the California State University, Chico as an assistant professor. She was later a faculty member at the University of Tennessee. She worked as a mass communications and journalism professor and academic administrator at Marist College for eight years. She served as its dean of the school of communication and the arts. From 2020 to 2021, Lepre was the provost and vice president for academic affairs at Radford University. She was succeeded by Bret S. Danilowicz. On July 1, 2021, she became its interim president, succeeding Brian Hemphill. On July 15, 2022, she became the tenth president of Salisbury University. She succeeded Charles A. Wight.

== Personal life ==
Lepre is married to her husband, Todd Lepre. Together, they have twin daughters.
