= Jesse L. Beauchamp =

American chemist (born 1942)

Jesse (Jack) L. Beauchamp
- Born: 1942 (age 83–84)
- Education: California Institute of Technology; Harvard University
- Known for: Mass Spectrometry
- Scientific career
- Fields: Chemist
- Workplaces: California Institute of Technology
- Thesis: Ion cyclotron resonance spectroscopy (1968)
- Doctoral advisor: John D. Baldeschwieler
- Doctoral students: Peter B. Armentrout; Charles A. Wight; Margaret A. Tolbert
- Website: www.jlb.caltech.edu

Jesse Lee Beauchamp (born 1942) is the Charles and Mary Ferkel Professor of Chemistry at the California Institute of Technology.

== Early life and education ==
- 1964 B.S. California Institute of Technology
- 1967 Ph.D. Harvard University

== Research interests ==
- Development of novel mass spectrometric techniques in biochemistry.

== Awards ==
In 1978 he received the ACS Award in Pure Chemistry from the American Chemical Society and in 1981 was elected to the National Academy of Sciences. In 1999 he received the Peter Debye Award in Physical Chemistry from the American Chemical Society and was again honored in 2003 with the Field and Franklin Award in Mass Spectrometry. In 2007 he received the Distinguished Contribution Award from the American Society for Mass Spectrometry for the original development and chemical applications of ion cyclotron resonance spectroscopy.

== Former students ==
- Charles A. Wight – President of Weber State University
- Frances Houle (1979) – Director of JCAP North
- Terry B. McMahon (1974) – Professor or chemistry at the University of Waterloo
- Peter B. Armentrout (1980) – Professor of chemistry at the University of Utah
- David Dearden (1989) – Chemistry and Biochemistry department chair at BYU
- Elaine Marzluff (1995) – Chemistry department chair at Grinnell College
