= Karen Mossberger =

American political scientist

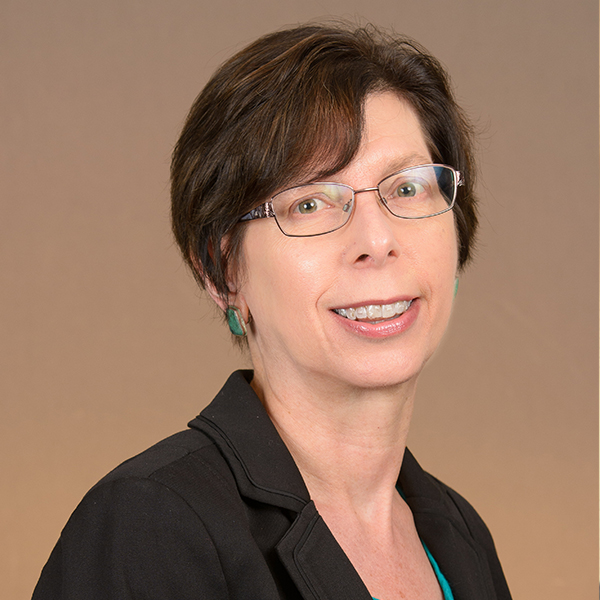
- Born: September 15, 1954 (age 71); Detroit, Michigan
- Education: Wayne State University
- Awards: Fellow, National Academy of Public Administration
- Scientific career
- Fields: Political science
- Workplaces: Eastern Michigan University; Kent State University; University of Illinois at Chicago; University of Birmingham; Arizona State University

Karen Mossberger (born September 15, 1954) is an American political scientist and scholar of public policy and public administration. She is the Frank and June Sackton Professor of Urban Policy at Arizona State University, where she is also Director of the School of Public Affairs and a Distinguished Sustainability Scholar at the Julie Ann Wrigley Global Institute of Sustainability. She is an expert on the diffusion and implementation of policy ideas, with a particular focus on the politics of internet access in the United States.

== Education and early work ==
Mossberger attended Wayne State University, where she earned three degrees: a BA in political science in 1991, an MA in political science in 1992, and a PhD in political science in 1996. During the 1992–1993 academic year, she was a visiting researcher at the University of Strathclyde.

In 1996 Mossberger joined Eastern Michigan University as a lecturer, moving in 1997 to Kent State University. While a professor at Kent State University, Mossberger was involved in a visiting faculty program with Tver State University, Volgograd State University, and Voronezh State University, and for one year she served as the Interim Director of the Center for Public Administration and Public Policy there. In 2005 she became a professor of public policy at the University of Illinois at Chicago, where she later became both the Associate Dean for Faculty Affairs at the College of Urban Planning and Public Affairs and for 2 years was the Head of the Department of Public Administration. In 2013 she became a professor at the Arizona State University School of Public Affairs, where she was also the director for 4 years. From 2014 to 2017, she was an honorary professor at the University of Birmingham.

== Career ==
In addition to her publications in peer-reviewed journals and chapters in edited volumes, Mossberger has published several books. In 2000 she published The Politics of Ideas and the Spread of Enterprise Zones, of which she was the sole author. The book studies how the concept of enterprise zones spread in the United States, using the tools of policy diffusion. Mossberger focuses on five states from 1981 to 1993: Indiana, Massachusetts, Michigan, New York, and Virginia. As part of her analysis of the diffusion and implementation of this idea throughout several regions, Mossberger also draws conclusions about the dynamics of decision-making in a federalist system, and under what conditions these decisions are rational, boundedly rational, or anarchic.

In 2013, together with Caroline Tolbert and William Franko, Mossberger published the book Digital Cities: The Internet and the Geography of Opportunity. The book defines the notion of "digital citizenship" to capture the extent to which individuals are capable of regularly and effectively using technology related to the internet. The authors focus on inequality in peoples' capacities to use internet technologies; Zachary Spicer, in a review of the book, wrote that they demonstrate that "America is falling short in these areas and, as a result, information inequities are developing that could have deep and lasting impacts on the social fabric of the country." The book also presents policy suggestions for making digital citizenship more equal.

Mossberger's 2008 book Digital Citizenship: The Internet, Society and Participation, coauthored with Caroline J. Tolbert and Ramona S. McNeal, was named one of the top 20 social science titles for 2008 by the American Library Association. The book was issued in a second printing in 2010. Mossberger is also the author of Virtual Inequality: Beyond the Digital Divide with Caroline J. Tolbert and Mary Stansbury (2003), and The Oxford Handbook of Urban Politics with Susan E. Clarke and Peter John (2012).

Several of Mossberger's journal articles have also won best paper awards. Her 2006 article with Caroline J. Tolbert, titled "The Effects of E-Government on Trust and Confidence in Government", was published in The Public Administration Review, and was subsequently named by the journal as one of the 75 most influential articles ever published there since the journal's founding in 1940. The paper was also listed as a Classic Paper by Google Scholar, which recognizes "highly-cited papers in their area of research that have stood the test of time". Her 2005 paper "Race, Place, and Information Technology" received the 2005 Best Paper Award from the Public Policy Section of the American Political Science Association.

In 2016, Mossberger was named a Fellow of the American National Academy of Public Administration.

Mossberger's work has been cited, or she has been quoted, in news outlets like the Chicago Tribune, FiveThirtyEight, Vocativ, and The Week.

== Selected works ==
- The Politics of Ideas and the Spread of Enterprise Zones (2000)
- "The Effects of E-Government on Trust and Confidence in Government", Public Administration Review, with Caroline J. Tolbert (2006)
- Digital Citizenship: The Internet, Society and Participation, with Caroline J. Tolbert and Ramona S. McNeal (2008)

== Selected awards ==
- Fellow, National Academy of Public Administration
- Author of a Google Scholar Classic Paper
