= Sarah Tolbert =

American chemist

Sarah Helen Tolbert
- Education: Yale University; University of California, Berkeley
- Scientific career
- Workplaces: University of California, Los Angeles
- Thesis: High pressure studies on nanometer sized clusters : structural, optical, and cooperative properties (1995)
- Doctoral advisor: A. Paul Alivisatos
- Other academic advisors: Galen D. Stucky
- Website: tolbert.chem.ucla.edu/index.html

Sarah Helen Tolbert is an American chemist who is a professor in the department of chemistry and biochemistry at the University of California, Los Angeles. Her research considers self-assembled nanomaterials, which includes inorganic phases and colloidal materials.

== Early life and education ==
Tolbert's father, Bert Tolbert, was a professor of chemistry at the University of Colorado Boulder. She was one of four daughters. Tolbert was an undergraduate student at Yale University. She moved to the University of California, Berkeley for graduate studies, where she studied the structural, optical and cooperative properties of nanomaterials. She was a postdoctoral scholar at the University of California, Santa Barbara.

== Research and career ==
Tolbert is interested in the nanoscale assembly of materials, and how these nanostructures give rise to novel phenomena. In particular, Tolbert has investigated arrays of colloids. Colloids assemble into closely-packed areas that can be used to create large scale periodic photonics materials.

Tolbert is interested in inorganic/organic co-assembly. To this end she combines block co-polymers or organic surfactants with short-chain inorganic oligomers. Her early work involved the development of novel conjugated polymer morphologies for efficient light-emitting diodes. Amongst these morphologies, Tolbert showed it was possible to embed polymers in a silica host matrix, where stretching the matrix results in aligned polymer chains that emit linearly polarized light.

Tolbert works on self-assembled nanomaterials. She is particularly interested in introducing structure and periodicity to composite materials. Tolbert has studied phase transitions in inorganic solids. She has created novel, nanostructured electrodes to allow the fast charging of batteries. These include molybdenum disulphide nanocrystal composites, where internal atomic-scale pathways allow lithium ions to speedily move through the electrode. The nanostructure electrodes not only support the efficient charging of batteries but also stable charge and discharging cycles.

Tolbert is a developer for Battery Streak, a spin-out company who look to reduce that charging time of electronic devices.

== Awards and honors ==
- Charles and Carolyn Knobler Endowed Term Chair (2025)
- Alfred P. Sloan Fellowship (2001)
- National Science Foundation CAREER Award (2000)
- Beckman Young Investigators Award (2000)
- Office of Naval Research Young Investigator Award (1999)

== Selected publications ==
- Veronica Augustyn; Jérémy Come; Michael A Lowe; et al. (April 14, 2013). "High-rate electrochemical energy storage through Li+ intercalation pseudocapacitance". Nature Materials. 12 (6): 518–522. doi:10.1038/nmat3601. ISSN 1476-1122. PMID 23584143. Wikidata Q43526337.
- Hyung-Seok Kim; John B Cook; Hao Lin; Jesse S Ko; Sarah H Tolbert; Vidvuds Ozolins; Bruce Dunn (December 5, 2016). "Oxygen vacancies enhance pseudocapacitive charge storage properties of MoO3-x". Nature Materials. 16 (4): 454–460. doi:10.1038/nmat4810. ISSN 1476-1122. PMID 27918566. Wikidata Q46051042.
- Thuc-Quyen Nguyen; Junjun Wu; Vinh Doan; Benjamin J. Schwartz; Sarah H. Tolbert (April 1, 2000). "Control of energy transfer in oriented conjugated polymer-mesoporous silica composites". Science. 288 (5466): 652–656. doi:10.1126/science.288.5466.652. ISSN 0036-8075. PMID 10784444. Wikidata Q41732690.

== Personal life ==
Tolbert's three sisters are all academics, including atmospheric chemist Margaret Tolbert, political scientist Caroline Tolbert and ethnomusicologist Elizabeth Tolbert. She was one of four daughters. Tolbert met her husband, Benjamin Schwartz, whilst a graduate student at the University of California, Berkeley.
