= Janet Dudley-Eshbach =

President of Salisbury University in Salisbury, Maryland

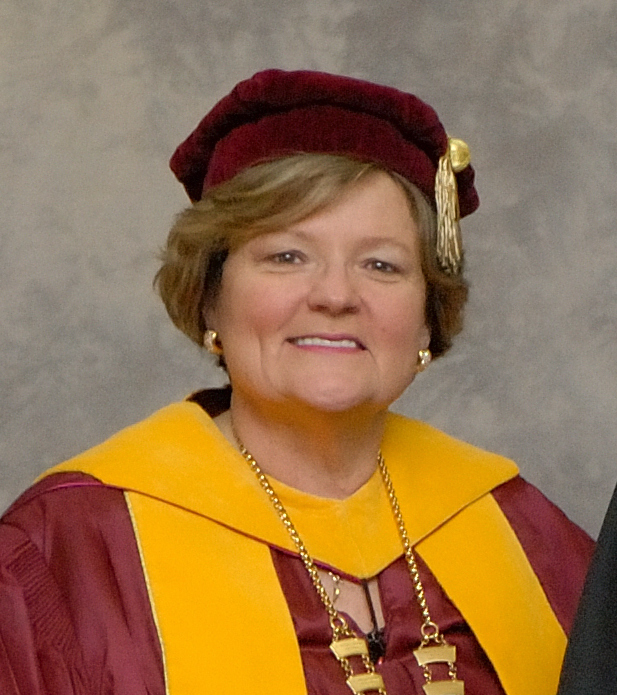
- Dudley-Eshbach in 2016

8th President of Salisbury University
- In office July 1, 2000 – June 30, 2018
- Preceded by: William C. Merwin
- Succeeded by: Charles A. Wight

18th President of Fairmont State College
- In office 1996–2000
- Preceded by: Robert J. Dillman
- Succeeded by: Daniel J. Bradley

Personal details
- Born: Janet Elizabeth Dudley

Academic background
- Education: Indiana University Bloomington; El Colegio de México
- Thesis: El proyecto de Macedonio Fernández para una primera novela buena (1986)
- Doctoral advisor: Adolfo de Obi
- Other advisor: Jorge Luis Borges

Academic work
- Discipline: Hispanic literature
- Institutions: Goucher College; Allegheny College; State University of New York at Potsdam; Fairmont State College; Salisbury University

Janet Dudley-Eshbach, Ph.D. became president of Salisbury University in Salisbury, Maryland in June 2000. She is the eighth president and the first woman to hold that office in the seventy-five year history of the university. In 2005, she was named one of Maryland's Top 100 Women in 2005 by the Maryland Daily Record. She retired in June 2018.

== Early life ==
Janet Elizabeth Dudley was born in Baltimore, Maryland, on January 18, 1953.

Dudley-Eshbach received an undergraduate degree in Spanish and Latin American studies from Indiana University, where she was a Phi Beta Kappa scholar, and holds a doctorate in Hispanic literature from El Colegio de México.

== Career ==
Before joining Salisbury, Dudley-Eshbach served four years as President of Fairmont State College in West Virginia, where she was also the first woman to hold the office of President at any public four-year college in the state's history. She spent eight years at the State University of New York at Potsdam, serving the roles of Professor of Spanish and Latin American studies, Chair of the Department of Modern Languages, Associate Vice President for Academic Affairs, and Dean of the School of Liberal Arts, before being appointed Provost in 1993. She was a full-time faculty member for ten years at Goucher College and Allegheny College. Her professional expertise is in international education, student recruitment, institutional marketing, fundraising, and shared governance, among other areas.

=== Honors and awards ===
2018 "Business Professional of the Year" award, Salisbury Area Chamber of Commerce

- 2018 "Woman of Distinction" award, Girl Scouts of the Chesapeake Bay
- Recipient William Donald Schaefer "People Helping People" award
- 2015 and 2017 "Influential Marylander" award by The Daily Record*Noel-Levitz 2012 Award for Excellence in Marketing and Recruitment
- "Most Admired CEO" award in 2012 by The Daily Record (Annapolis)*2010 Inducted into the "Circle of Excellence" as a three-time recipient of The Daily Record's Maryland's Top 100 Women recognition
- Member of the Honorary Committee for "Finding Justice," an organization of distinguished women lawyers in Maryland (members include Dr. Madeleine K. Albright, Ms. Kendal S. Ehrlich, among others)
- Invited participant in President Bill Clinton's Global Initiative Project
- Outstanding Women in History Award, Office of Multicultural Affairs, Fairmont State College, 1997
- Women of Distinction Award, Soroptimist International of the Americas, 1997
- "Young Leader of the Academy" (Fairmont State College), Change magazine, 1998
- Elizabeth Dole Shattered Glass Award, American Red Cross, 1999
- Recognition Award, Wicomico County Commission for Women, 2002
- Maryland's Top 100 Women, the Daily Record, 2005

=== Professional memberships ===
- American Association of State Colleges and Universities
- National Association of Women in Higher Education,
- American Council on Education's Commission on Women
- Eastern Shore Association of Colleges

== Personal life ==
Dudley-Eshbach enjoys writing poetry and essays, reading, playing the guitar, travel, biking, and beachcombing. A native of Baltimore, she is married to Joseph Eshbach, and has two children.

== Facebook controversy ==
In 2007 Dudley-Eshbach posted several pictures on her Facebook profile, among which was a picture of Dudley-Eshbach pointing a stick toward her daughter and a Hispanic man. The caption underneath the picture read that she had to "beat off the Mexicans because they were constantly flirting with my daughter."

After being contacted by the media, which had been alerted by upset students, Dudley-Eshbach removed the photos and issued the following statement: "Many of us are learning about the positives and negatives of public networking sites such as Facebook. I regret that some of these family vacation photos, with captions that were only intended to be humorous, were included on Facebook. I did not intend for these photos to end up in the public domain, and I am grateful that this was brought to my attention. I sincerely apologize for any offense anyone may have taken."

In an interview with the Washington Post Dudley-Eshbach said, "Somebody said that the fact that I was apparently going to hit a Mexican, that that was racism. That's not the way it was intended. Frankly, I think the media locally here is trying to make a sensational story about something that was, on our part, innocent. The truth is, I am a very fun-loving person. What we were doing was having fun. There was nothing immoral, there was nothing illegal, there was nothing illicit."

Academic offices
Preceded by Robert J. Dillman	18th President of Fairmont State College; 1996 – 2000	Succeeded by Daniel J. Bradley
Preceded by William C. Merwin	8th President of Salisbury University; 2000 – 2018	Succeeded by Charles A. Wight
