= Caroline Tolbert =

American political scientist

- Education: University of California, Santa Barbara; University of Colorado, Boulder
- Awards: Collegiate Scholar Award, University of Iowa
- Scientific career
- Fields: Political science
- Workplaces: Colorado College; Kent State University; University of Iowa

Caroline Tolbert is an American political scientist. She is a professor of political science at the University of Iowa. She studies elections, voting, and civic engagement in American politics. Much of her work deals with peoples' capacity to use internet technology, digital technology policy, and the relationship between technology use and social participation.

== Early work and education ==
Tolbert attended the University of California, Santa Barbara, graduating with a BA in political science in 1989. She then received an MA in public policy from the University of Colorado, Boulder in 1991, followed by a PhD in political science from the same institution in 1996.

From 1996 to 1997, Tolbert was an information technology specialist at Colorado College, and then joined the political science faculty at Kent State University in 1997. In 2006 she moved to the University of Iowa.

== Career ==
Tolbert has been a coauthor of 8 books. In 2013 she coauthored the book Digital Cities: The Internet and the Geography of Opportunity with Karen Mossberger and William W. Franko. The book develops a notion of "digital citizenship", which captures the extent to which individuals are capable of regularly and effectively using technology related to the internet. The authors focus on inequality in peoples' capacities to use internet technologies; Zachary Spicer, in a review of the book, wrote that they demonstrate that "America is falling short in these areas and, as a result, information inequities are developing that could have deep and lasting impacts on the social fabric of the country." The book also presents policy suggestions for making digital citizenship more equal.

Tolbert became a coauthor of the American politics textbook We the people: An introduction to American politics when the book was in its ninth edition in 2012. This textbook, which she coauthored with Benjamin Ginsberg, Theodore J. Lowi, Margaret Weir, and (in later editions) Andrea L. Campbell, had been published in 12 editions by 2020.

Tolbert has also published dozens of articles in political science and public policy journals. Her 2006 article with Karen Mossberger, "The Effects of E-Government on Trust and Confidence in Government", was published in The Public Administration Review, and was subsequently named by the journal as one of the 75 most influential articles ever published there since the journal's founding in 1940.

Tolbert was the solo recipient of the 2009-2011 Collegiate Scholar Award at the University of Iowa, which recognizes "mid-career faculty for exceptional achievement".

A 2019 citation analysis by the political scientists Hannah June Kim and Bernard Grofman listed Tolbert as one of the most cited political scientists working at an American university in 2 different categories: the top 40 most cited women scholars, and the top 25 most cited political scientists who earned their PhD between 1995 and 1999 (inclusive).

Tolbert's work has been cited in news outlets like The New York Times, Vox, and The Wall Street Journal, particularly her work relating to the sequence of United States presidential primary election contests and her 2010 book Why Iowa? How Caucuses and Sequential Elections Improve the Presidential Nominating Process.

== Selected works ==
- "The Effects of E-Government on Trust and Confidence in Government", Public Administration Review (2006)
- We the people: An introduction to American politics (from 9th edition, 2012 onwards)
- Digital Cities: The Internet and the Geography of Opportunity (2013)

== Selected awards ==
- Collegiate Scholar Award, University of Iowa (2009)

== Personal life ==
Tolbert's four sisters are all academics, including atmospheric chemist Margaret A. Tolbert, materials chemist Sarah Tolbert and ethnomusicologist Elizabeth Tolbert. She was one of four daughters.
