= John D. Baldeschwieler =

American chemist (born 1933)

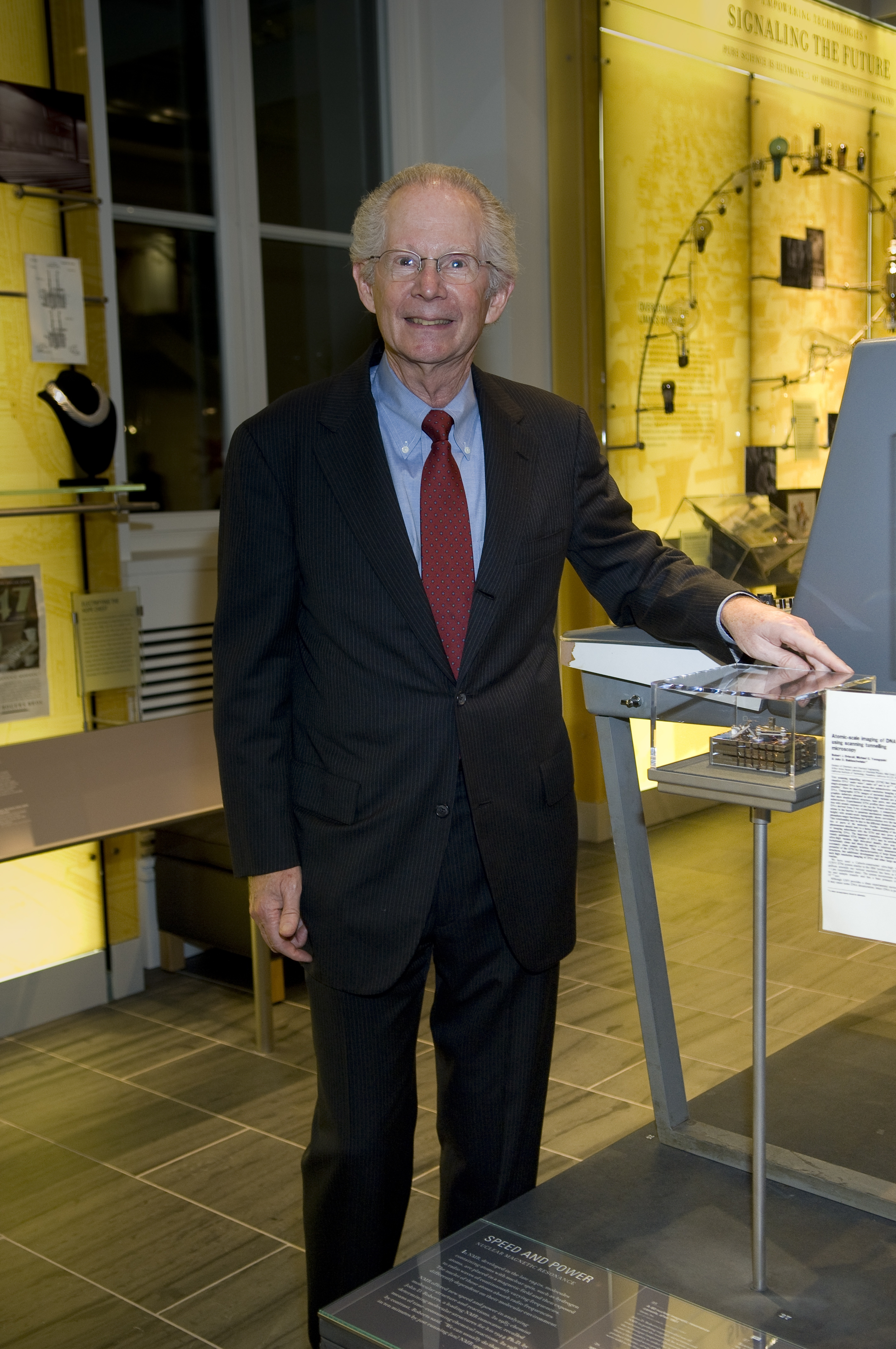
- Baldeschwieler in 2008
- Born: November 14, 1933 (age 92); Elizabeth, New Jersey, U.S.
- Education: Cornell University (B.S., 1956); University of California, Berkeley (Ph.D., 1959)
- Known for: Molecular Structure and Spectroscopy
- Awards: National Medal of Science (2000)
- Scientific career
- Fields: Chemistry
- Workplaces: Harvard University; Stanford University; California Institute of Technology
- Thesis: Structure of unstable compounds by matrix isolation techniques (1959)
- Doctoral advisor: George C. Pimentel
- Doctoral students: Jesse L. Beauchamp
- Website: www.cce.caltech.edu/content/john-d-baldeschwieler

John Dickson Baldeschwieler (born 1933) is an American chemist who has made significant contributions in molecular structure and spectroscopy.

Born on November 14, 1933, in Elizabeth, New Jersey, he was an alumnus of Cornell University (B.S., 1956, Chemical Engineering) and the University of California, Berkeley (Ph.D., 1959). He has taught at Harvard University, Stanford University and currently is the J. Stanley Johnson Professor and professor of chemistry, emeritus at Caltech.

== Awards and recognition ==
Baldeschwieler has received multiple awards for his research, including the National Medal of Science, awarded in 2000, "For his imaginative development of new methods for determining the properties, structures, motions and interactions of molecules and molecular assemblies, the translation of these advances into practical pharmaceutical and instrumentation products for the public benefit, and extensive service to his government and the scientific community." He was elected to the National Academy of Sciences in 1970, the American Academy of Arts and Sciences in 1972 and the American Philosophical Society in 1979.

Additional awards include:

- 1962–1965 Alfred P. Sloan Fellowship
- 1967 Award in Pure Chemistry, American Chemical Society
- 1968 Fresenius Award of Phi Lambda Upsilon
- 1989 Richard C. Tolman Medal, American Chemical Society
- 1990 William H. Nichols Medal, American Chemical Society
- 2001 Award for Creative Invention, American Chemical Society
- 2003 Othmer Gold Medal, Chemical Heritage Foundation
