= Deborah J. Curtis =

President of Indiana State University

12th President of the Indiana State University
- In office January 3, 2018 – May 30, 2024
- Preceded by: Daniel J. Bradley
- Succeeded by: Mike Godard

Academic background
- Education: MacMurray College (BM); University of Illinois Urbana-Champaign (MA); Indiana State University (PhD)
- Thesis: A study of selected scholastic and personality variables as predictors of success in student teaching (1986)

Academic work
- Discipline: Music education
- Institutions: Illinois State University; University of Central Missouri; Indiana State University

Dr. Deborah J. Curtis was a music educator and the twelfth President of Indiana State University. She was the first woman to hold that position, she was appointed president 2018, and retired in 2024. She was replaced by Mike Godard.

== Education ==
Curtis received her bachelor degree in music education from MacMurray College and her master degree in music education from the University of Illinois Urbana-Champaign. She received her Ph.D. in instruction and curriculum from Indiana State University in 1986.

== Career ==
Curtis joined the faculty of Illinois State University in the College of Education in 1984. While at Illinois State, Curtis served as the chair of Clinical Experiences and Certification Processes and director of the Teacher Education Center before serving as director of the Cecilia J. Lauby Teacher Education Center from 2001 to 2005. In July 2005, Curtis was appointed interim dean of the College of Education before becoming full dean in October 2006.

From July 2012 until December 2017, served as provost and chief learning officer for the University of Central Missouri. She was replaced as provost in 2017 by Mike Godard, who would later replace her at Indiana State in 2024.

Academic offices
| Preceded by Daniel J. Bradley | 12th President of the Indiana State University; 2018 – 2024 | Succeeded by Mike Godard |
