= Charles A. Wight =

American university president

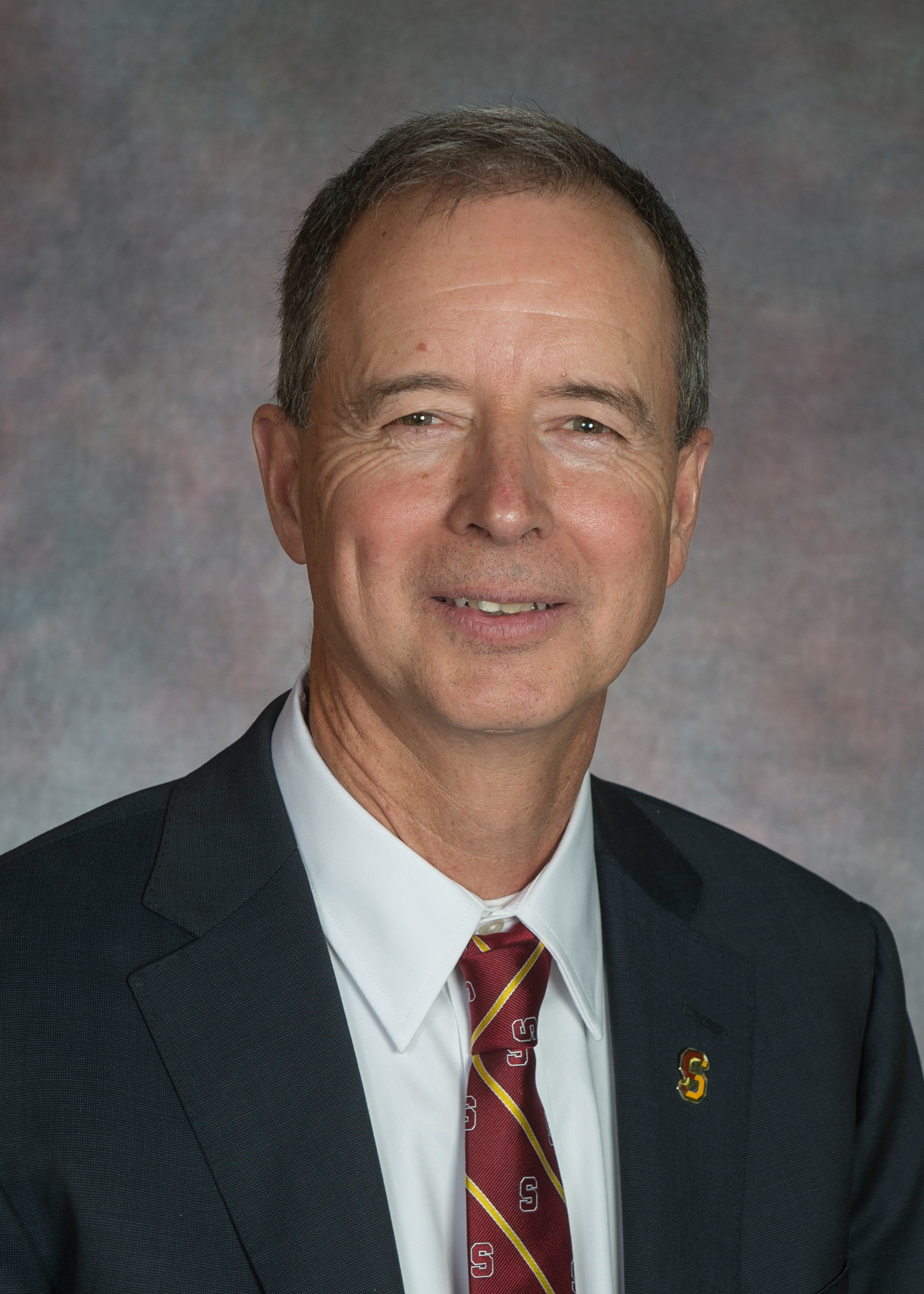
- In 2018

9th President of Salisbury University
- In office July 1, 2018 – July 14, 2022
- Preceded by: Janet Dudley-Eshbach
- Succeeded by: Carolyn Ringer Lepre

12th President of Weber State University
- In office January 1, 2013 – April 30, 2018
- Preceded by: F. Ann Millner
- Succeeded by: Norm Tarbox (acting); Brad L. Mortensen

Personal details
- Born: Glen Cove, New York, US
- Education: University of Virginia, California Institute of Technology
- Occupation: University administrator, chemist
- Website: Archived 2018-11-09 at the Wayback Machine
- Scientific career
- Fields: propellant chemistry
- Workplaces: University of Utah
- Thesis: Chemical applications of infrared laser photochemistry (1982)
- Doctoral advisor: Jesse L. Beauchamp

Charles Albert "Chuck" Wight is an American retired analytical chemist and academic administrator who had served as the twelfth president of Weber State University in Utah from 2013 until 2018 and later as the ninth president of Salisbury University in Maryland from 2018 until 2022.

== Biography ==
Born in Glen Cove, New York to Bill & Pat Wight, Wight earned a B.S. in chemistry from the University of Virginia in 1977 and a Ph.D. in chemistry from the California Institute of Technology (Caltech), where his advisor was Jesse L. Beauchamp. After completing postdoctoral work for the University of Colorado, he spent nearly three decades as a chemistry faculty member then administrator at the University of Utah, where his roles included dean of the graduate school, assistant vice president of continuing education and others. He served as president of Weber State University in Ogden, Utah, from 2012-2018 and became the ninth president of Salisbury University in Salisbury, Maryland, on July 1, 2018.

== Presidential tenure at Weber State University ==
On Oct. 9, 2012, the Utah State Board of Regents selected Wight as president of Weber State University. He officially took over for President F. Ann Millner on Jan. 1, 2013, with an inauguration celebration on Oct. 22 of that year. During his inaugural address, Wight outlined five priorities: keeping college affordable, beautiful and sustainable campuses, innovative teaching, increasing campus diversity, and increasing connections between the university and community. Toward those ends, his tenure has included the creation of a chief diversity officer position within the university, the establishment of a college town charter between the university and Ogden City and the creation of the university's largest solar array. For the aforementioned college town charter and associated relationship, Ogden City and WSU received the 2015 Larry Abernathy Award from the Clemson Joint City University Board. The award, which recognizes excellent college town relationships, is given at the International Town & Gown Association's annual conference. Vice President for Administrative Services Norm Tarbox replaced Wight as acting president on May 1, 2018.

== Presidential tenure at Salisbury University ==
On Apr. 3, 2018, the University System of Maryland Board of Regents announced Wight had been selected as Salisbury University's ninth president. He officially succeeded President Janet Dudley-Eshbach on July 1, 2018. During his introduction to campus, he said he wanted SU to be "a school that continues to grow, and we want a school that continues to be higher and higher quality." He has since stressed his desire for a student-centric campus and outlined goals similar to those he met at Weber State: college affordability, diversity and inclusion, maintaining a beautiful and sustainable campus, improving student success and building mutually positive relationships with the community.

On October 7, 2021, Wight announced that he would step down as President of Salisbury University on June 30, 2022, citing health concerns. Wight will be succeeded by Dr. Carolyn Ringer Lepre effective July 15, 2022.

== Academic emphasis ==
Wight has expertise in the chemistry of explosives, particularly the decomposition and combustion reactions of high explosives and propellants. His research has developed computational models of propellant combustion and detonation for use in simulations for the now-decommissioned Center for Simulation of Accidental Fires and Explosions (C-SAFE). Wight served as deputy director of C-SAFE from 2002 to 2010.

Academic offices
Preceded by F. Ann Millner	12th President of Weber State University; 2012 – 2018	Succeeded by Norm Tarbox (acting)
Preceded by Janet Dudley-Eshbach	9th President of Salisbury University; 2018 – 2022	Succeeded by Carolyn Ringer Lepre
