= List of presidents of the Indiana State University =

The following are Indiana State University presidents. Indiana State is located in Terre Haute, Indiana.

No.	Image	President	Term start	Term end	Refs.
1		William Albert Jones	1869	1879	
2		George Pliny Brown	1879	1885	
3		William Wood Parsons	1885	1921	
4		Linnaeus Neal Hines	1921	1933	
5		Ralph Noble Tirey	1934	1953	
6		Raleigh Warren Holmstedt	1953	1965	
7		Alan Carson Rankin	1965	1975	
8		Richard George Landini	1975	1992	
9		John Moore	1992	2000	
10		Lloyd W. Benjamin III	July 1, 2000	June 30, 2008	
interim		C. Jack Maynard	July 1, 2008	July 30, 2008	
11		Daniel J. Bradley	July 31, 2008	January 3, 2018	
12		Deborah J. Curtis	January 4, 2018	May 31, 2024	
13		Michael P. Godard	June 1, 2024	Present	
