= Peter B. Armentrout =

American chemist and academic (born 1953)

- Born: March 13, 1953 (age 73)
- Education: Case Western Reserve University; California Institute of Technology
- Known for: Mass Spectrometry
- Scientific career
- Fields: Chemist
- Workplaces: University of Utah, Bell Labs
- Thesis: Mechanistic and thermochemical studies of the reactions of transition metal ions and uranium ions with small molecules in the gas phase (1980)
- Doctoral advisor: Jesse L. Beauchamp
- Website: chem.utah.edu/directory/armentrout/

Peter Bruce Armentrout (born 1953) is a researcher in thermochemistry, kinetics, and dynamics of simple and complex chemical reactions. He is a Chemistry Professor at the University of Utah.

== Career ==
Armentrout received his B.S. degree from Case Western Reserve University in 1975 and earned his Ph.D. from the California Institute of Technology in 1980. During these studies he determined that much of the published information on thermodynamic states was not reliable, or was presented in differing formats. When he became a research professor he used this frustration as motivation to invent and construct the guided ion-beam tandem mass spectrometer, which provided highly accurate thermodynamic measurements. With this instrument in hand, he went on to invent or improve tools to analyze those measurements, including advanced computer algorithms. He has published much data on the properties of transition metals, and has worked most recently on the thermodynamic properties of biological systems.

== Awards ==
- 1984–1989 National Science Foundation Presidential Young Investigator Award
- 2001 Biemann Medal
- Case Western Chemistry Department - Outstanding Alumnus of the Year
- American Chemical Society Utah Section - Award of Chemistry
- Member of Phi Kappa Phi Honor Society
- 2009 American Chemical Society – Award for Outstanding Achievement in Mass Spectrometry
