= Condit Crossing, Pennsylvania =

Unincorporated community in Pennsylvania, US

Condit Crossing
- Unincorporated community
- Location within the U.S. state of Pennsylvania Condit Crossing (the United States)
- Coordinates: 40°3′56″N 80°13′49″W
- Country: United States
- State: Pennsylvania
- County: Washington
- Elevation: 997 ft (304 m)
- Time zone: UTC-5 (Eastern (EST))
  - Summer (DST): UTC-4 (EDT)

Condit Crossing is an unincorporated community on Banetown Road in Washington County, Pennsylvania, United States. Condit Crossing is located 28 miles (45 km) southwest of Pittsburgh in the Eastern Time Zone and has an elevation of 997 feet (304 m). Condit Crossing is not a census designated or incorporated place having an official federally recognized name. Condit Crossing appears on the Amity U.S. Geological Survey Map and observes daylight saving time.

== Major intersection ==
South of Condit Crossing, Banetown Road intersects with Pettit Road to the northwest and Ross Road to the southwest. Banetown, Pennsylvania is north of Condit Crossing.

== Railroad service ==
Condit Crossing was a stop on the Waynesburg and Washington Railroad. This rail line connected the county seats of Washington and Greene counties. The rail line has now fallen into disrepair.

== History ==
The place takes its name from one of the earliest settlers to the county, Jonas Condit, who came to the area in about 1794.
