= ConDiT =

Buenos Aires concert series

Coordinates: 34°38′34.44″S 58°24′21.96″W

conDiT
- Conciertos del Distrito Tecnológico
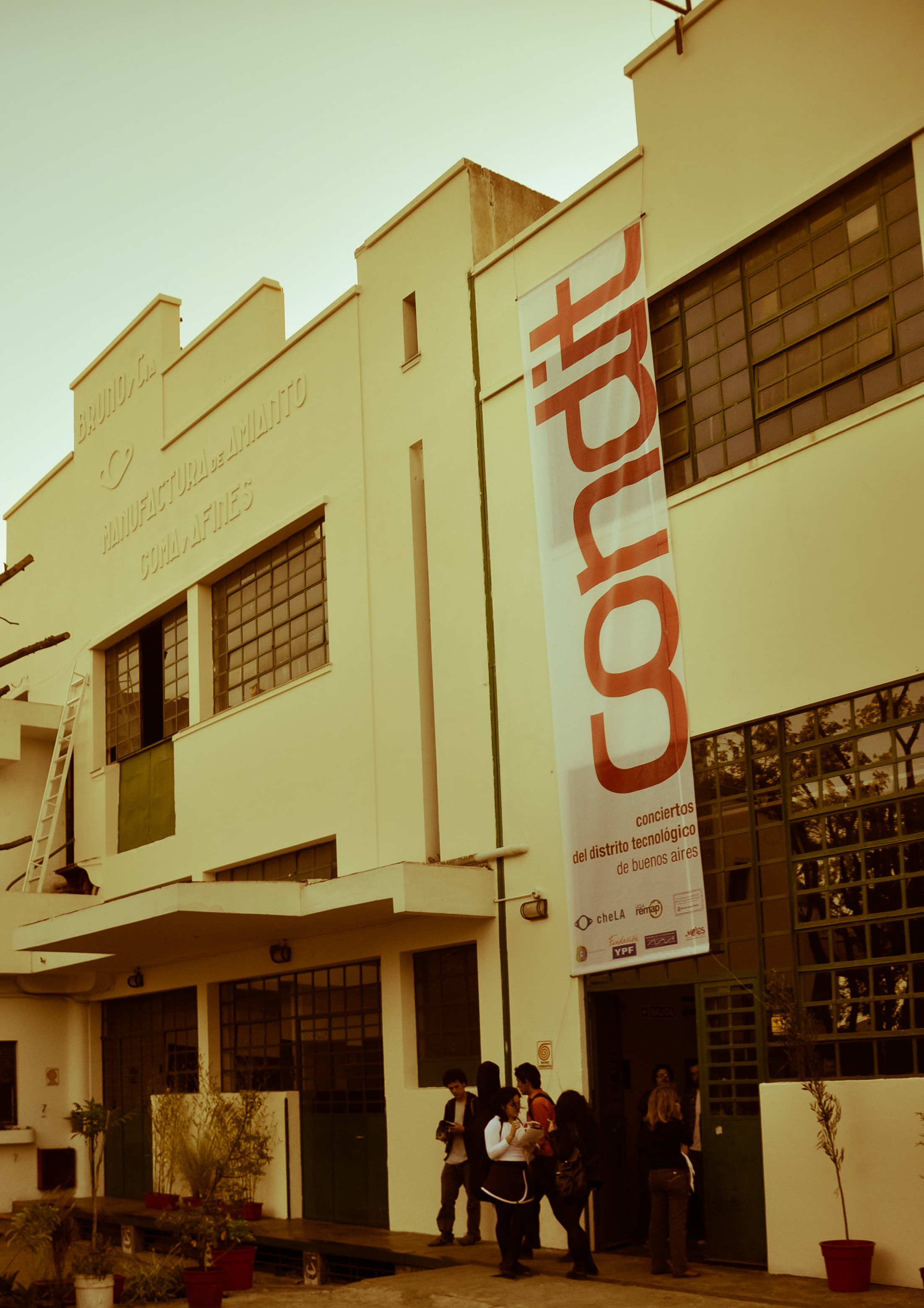
- conDiT
- Interactive map of conDiT
- Address: Iguazú 451; Ciudad Autónoma de Buenos Aires; Argentina
- Capacity: 300 (est.)
- Type: Concert Music
- Designation: Buenos Aires

Construction
- Opened: October 28, 2011 October 29, 2017
- Years active: 2011-2017
- Architect: Maria Andrea Farina

Website
- www.condit.org.ar

conDiT (acronym of Concerts of Technological District) was a musical creation platform founded in Buenos Aires on 28 October 2011.

== Origins ==
conDIT [Buenos Aires Technological District's Concerts] was a creation platform of concert music, in other words, the new 'classical music' made in the 2010s.

Around conDIT, since its foundation in 2011, more than sixty national and international activities has been produced, including workshops, concerts, artistic residencies and tours, a biannual magazine called Espiral, spreading the musical thinking of musicians participating in the platform. More than thirty commissions, four call for works, and a media open access repository. Since the idea of its founder of creating an independent platform for long-term musical projects, several artists actively participated in the growth and management of the platform. Among others, Bruno Mesz, Fernando Manassero, Rosa Nolly, José Rafael Subía Valdez, Virginia Chacon Dorr, Juan Marco Litrica, Roberto Maqueda, Tatiana Cuoco, Ramiro Iturrioz, Andrea Farina, Daniel Halaban, Florencia Curci, Javier Areal Velez, Rodrigo Gallegos Pinto and Lucas Giono.

== Activities between 2011 – 2014 ==
Between 2011 and 2013, seventeen commissioned works from national and international artists have been premiered. Of those seventeen pieces of art, nine music works were commissioned by new composers, six workshops for residents and external participants, six “Espiral” journal publications, and numerous digital texts. ConDiT has also hosted the International Gaudeamus Competition Muziekweek (Netherlands).

Many national and international musicians and ensembles participated in conDiT’s concerts, including the double-bass row from the Teatro Colón Orchestra, the French horn player Delphine Gaulthier Guiche, the cellist Martín Devoto, Manos a las Obras duo (formed by the pianist Haydée Schvartz and the violinist Elías Gurevich) Modelo62 ensemble (Netherlands), suono mobile ensemble (Córdoba, Argentina), Nonsense vocal ensemble, the experimental music duo Cilantro, the composer Martin Tellinga (Netherlands), and the Institute of Sonology of The Hague.

The events and concerts performed are closely articulated with a formative and relational instance, addressed both to the public and to the artists, and that is reflected in the multiple activities that surround the performances.

For this purpose conDiT organizes lectures, seminars, and workshops aimed to create opportunities for local and international artistas to share their experiences and knowledge. Among the most remarkable actions can be listed: Delphine Gauthier- Guiche seminar (2013- UNQUI), reConvert Project seminar (2013 - cheLA), Minka 1 (2013-cheLA) and Minka 2 (2013-cheLA).

In 2014 conDiT received two international artists in residence: the Austrian composer Christine Schorkhuber (performance and installation in March); and the Japanese composer Reiko Yamada (installation in August). The residence of German artist Noid is scheduled for December, he will present an installation and concert pieces.

Transatlantic Interscores, performed in August in Vienna, was the first international conDiT concert with the participation of the Spanish percussion duo ReConvert Project.

In November conDiT produced the concert Escrituras Argentinas, with the support of the Ciclo de Música Contemporánea del Teatro General San Martín. The concert included works commissioned by the platform. The artists selected were Pablo Araya, Fernando Manassero, Luciano Azzigotti, and Valentin Pelisch.

== Special Projects ==
=== Espiral ===
Espiral is a biannual magazine in which artists, critics, and organizers involved in conDiT manifest their reflections and reviews about the works and activities developed under the management of the platform. Some articles by authors specialized in different areas within the music field (and its relationship with other arts) are occasionally included. Espiral also works as playbill concerts, providing a reflective framework for the performances. Some of the authors who participated in Espiral are: Luciano Azzigotti, Luciano Kulikov, Ezequiel Dobrovsky, Fernando Manassero, Ezequiel Menalled, Gabriel Paiuk, Dick Raaijmakers, Martjin Tellinga, Eduardo Spinelli and Nicolaus A. Huber. Related to conDiT’s artistic proposal, the content of Espiral is based on a multidisciplinary esthetic program. This relationship is materialized through the involvement of different artists to generate de audiovisual material for each publication. Among the visual who participated in Espiral are: Tomás Rawski, Diego Alberti, and Ananke Assef.

=== taPeTe (Technological Performance Atelier) ===
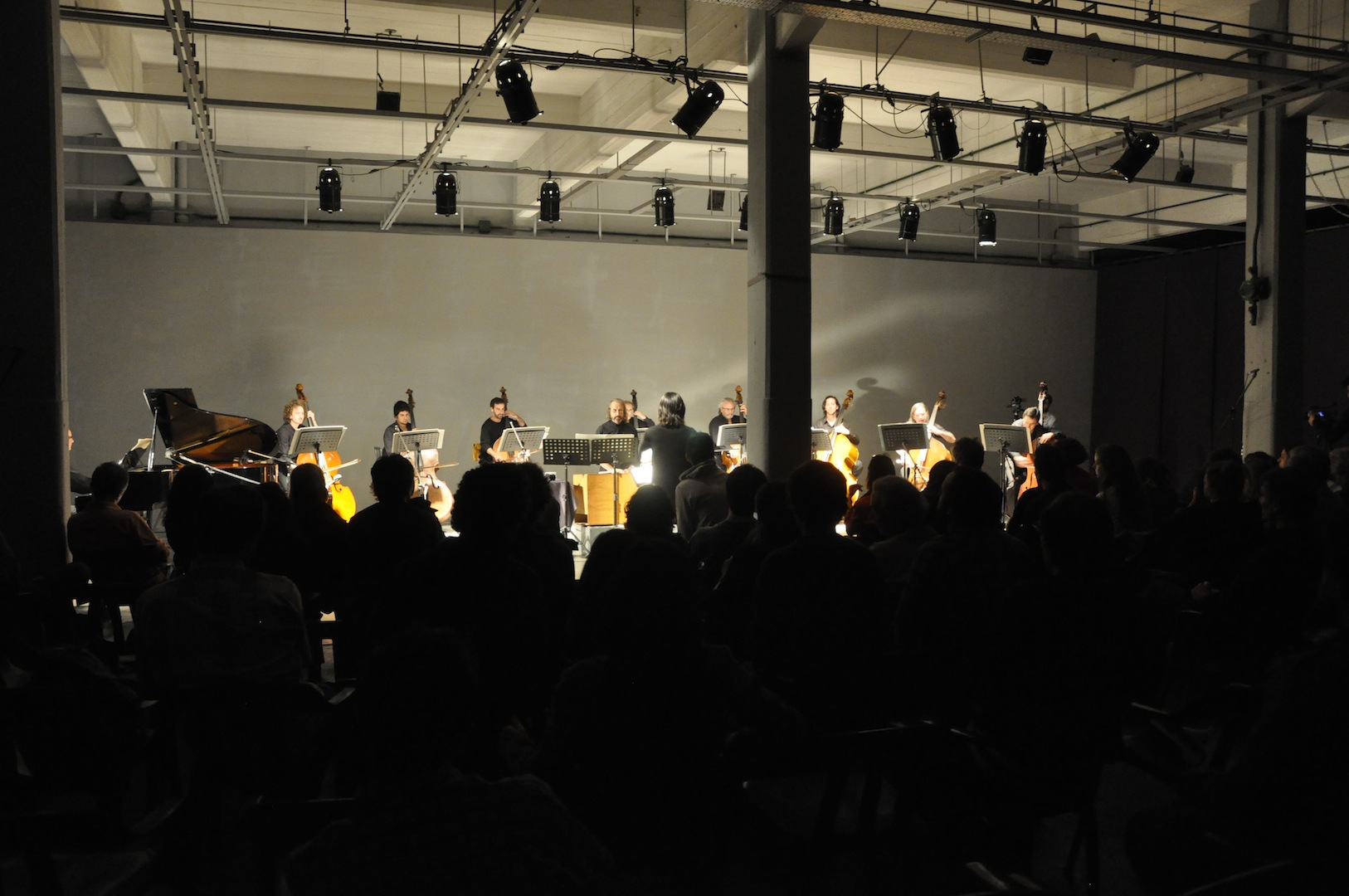
taPeTe at conDiT's first concert

taPeTe was created to fulfill the contemporary music’s need for a theater that can be configured to meet diverse purposes. The graduation of the acoustic ranks of absorption and diffusion in three defined spectral bands, helps the space to meet the requirement of traditional concert pieces. They require a high level of definition and sound customization. In taPeTe can also be performed acoustic pieces for instruments which require very specific space conditions, but can also be adapted to performances which require the use of extended materials. Finally, on the auditorium can be developed instrumental and scenographic workshops, aimed to provide a space to fulfill luthiers’ and composers’ needs. In every Project the artists are able to use the space and manage it in totally different ways, offering different experiencies from the traditional ones – not only in theatrical but also in spatial terms. In taPeTe can also be performed contemporary pieces that can not be displayed in any other conventional space.

=== Minka ===
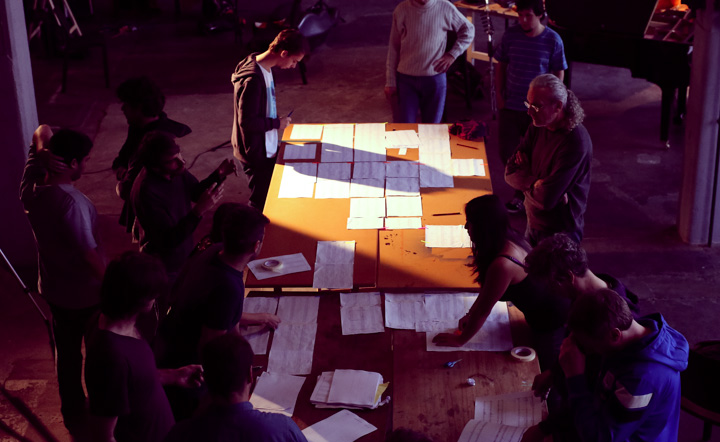
Final phase of first Minka

Minka is a pre-Columbian tradition of volunteer work, in which the members of a community work for the advantage of the whole group. In some áreas the Minka is still relevant today. Based on this concept, keeping in mind the idea the creation of a cooperative working method, the composers Luciano Azzigotti, Fernando Manassero and Rafael Subía Valdez designed a composing system under the name of Minka.

The first Minka was done in cooperation with the assembles Modelo62 (resident at Condit in April 2013) and the Contemporary Music Ensemble of the Department of Performing Arts IUNA, The cooperative composition system consisted of a working day to create and assemble a piece from scratch, under five pre-set slogans organized in five phases.

The second Minka took place in October 2013 with suono mobile Argentina, a contemporary music ensemble from Cordoba (resident at conDiT) in cooperation with Contemporary Music Ensemble of the Department of Performing Arts IUNA.

=== Container ===
In Argentina there is a tradition related to classical concert music, in which the programmers and regisseurs of Argentine concert halls receive (with the support of embassies) top level foreign artists who spread the music of their countries in Argentina. This project has the clear objective to generate a mutual opportunity, so Argentine composers and musicians can spread their work abroad within an integrated broadcasting, recording, and international artists’ exchange program; framed by the principle of equal opportunities. The purpose is: update the old "center-periphery" relationship, energizing and encouraging the symmetry of cultural exchange between Argentina and the world. The first chapter of Container is possible thanks to the collaboration between the Embassy of Argentina and conDiT.cheLA, whose team will be in charge of the organization, choice of repertoire and residents, commission works, and the activities advertising. This project will be carried out by groups and halls in Vienna and Graz, associated with conDiT, and will be the second step after the partnerships we have begun in 2014 with the reception of Austrian artists in our platform. During 2015 conDiT will form an ensemble in Vienna with young professional musicians. The ensemble will premiere works by Argentine young composers, programmed for the second Container concert (the first antecedent is Transatlantic Interscores, July 2014) on December 10.

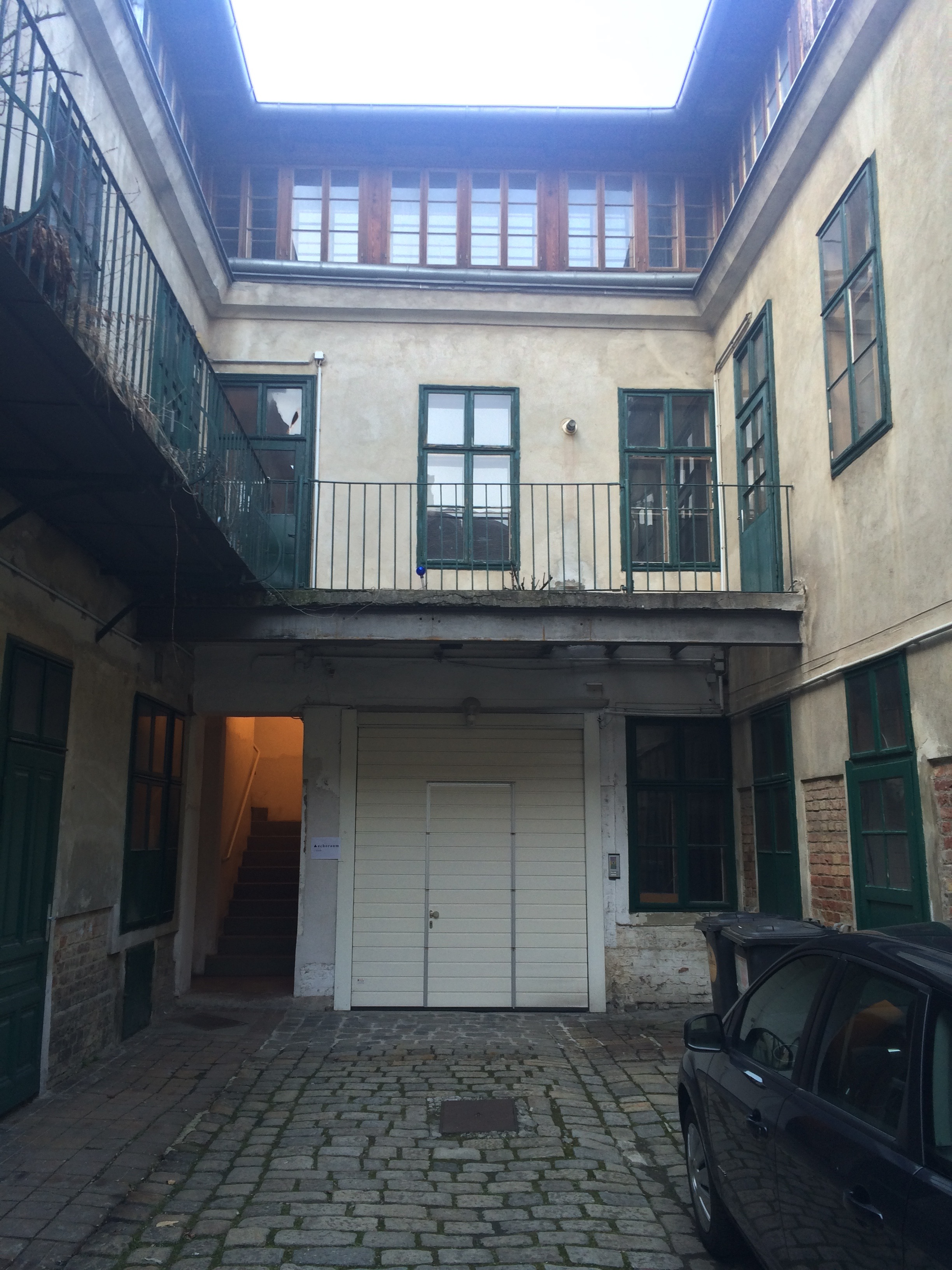
la sala Echoraum en la ciudad de Viena

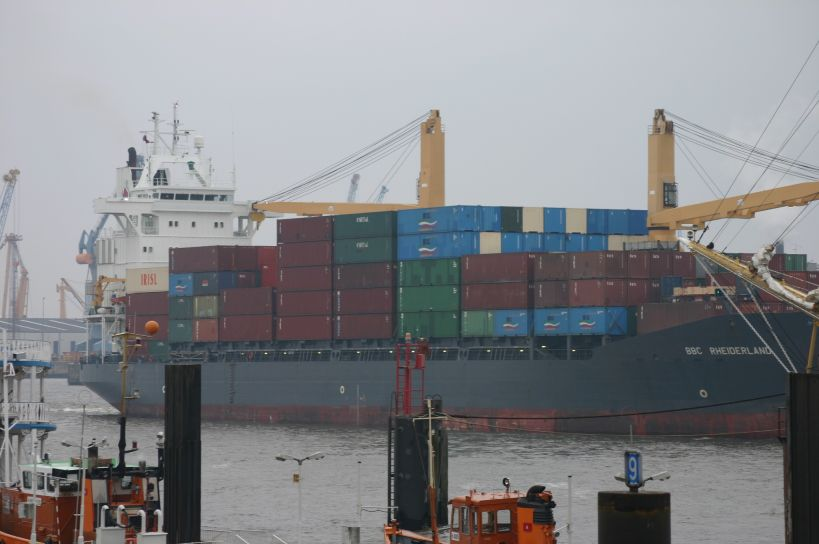

=== Church organ's restoration ===
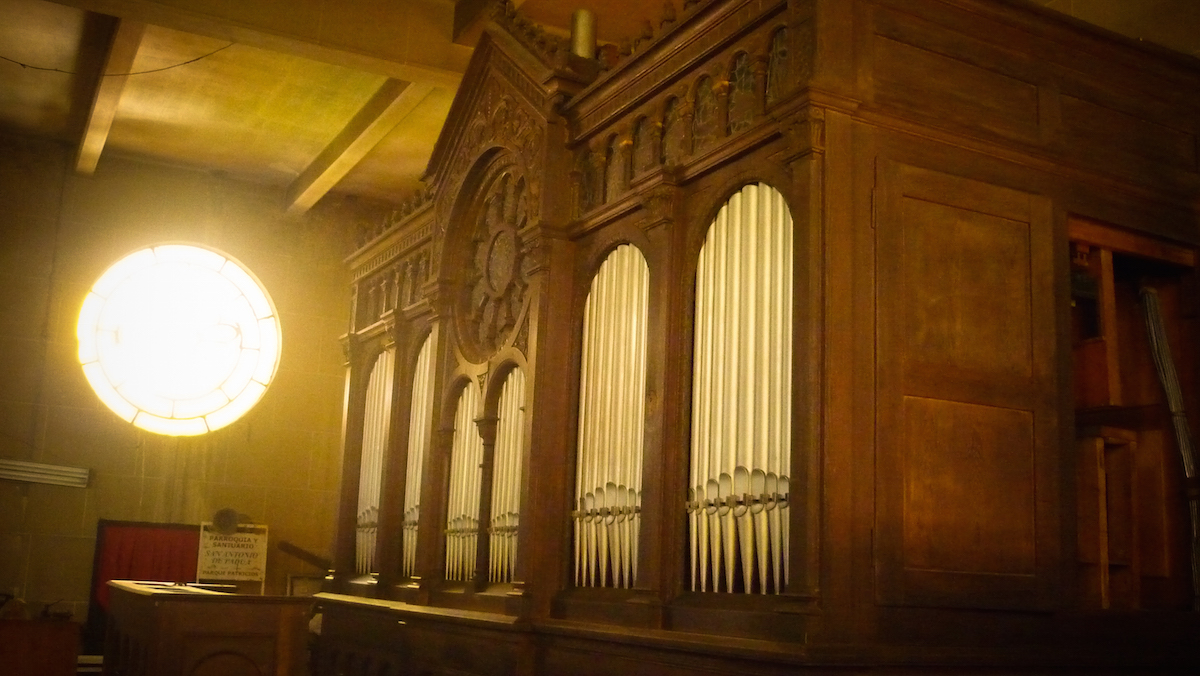

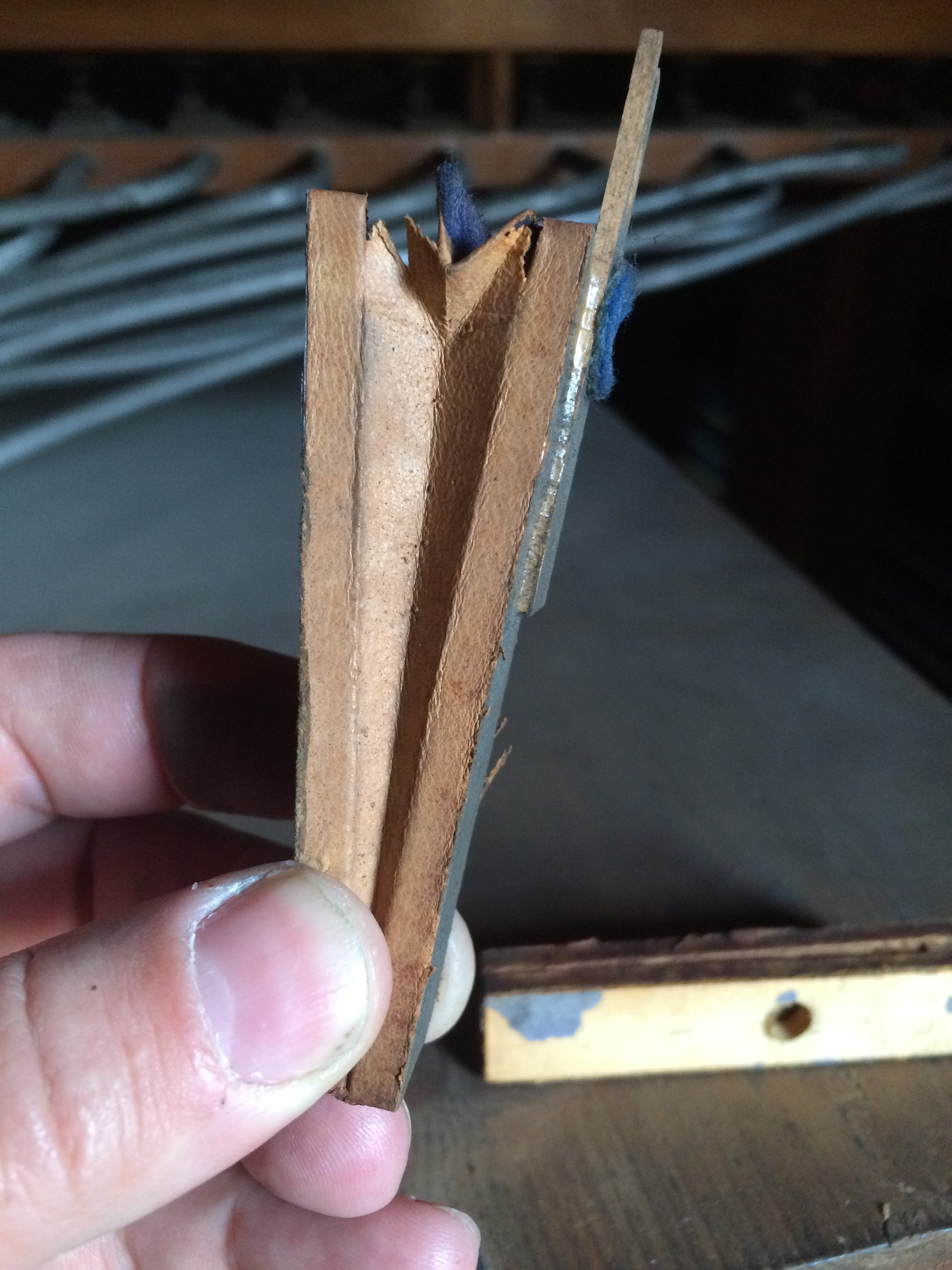

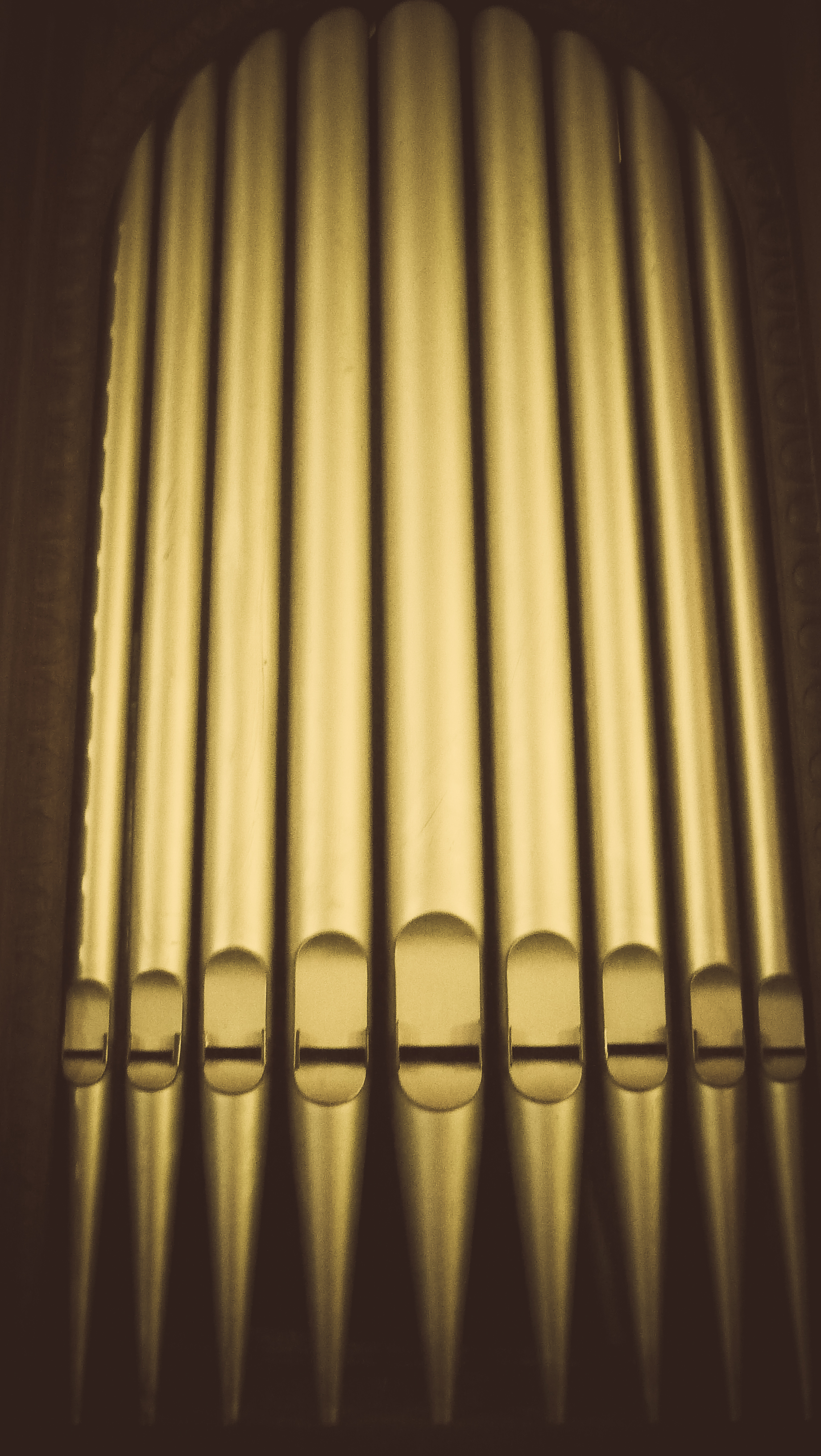

== Commissioned works ==
Commissioned works by conDiT (updated, March 2019)
Year	Work	Kind	Composer	Duration	Country	Record
2011	loom, for trio.	Chamber music	Veronika Zatula	7:00	Russia
2011	dissolution, for quintet.	Chamber music	Gyorgy Dorokhov	15:00	Russia
2011	Arcano XVIII, para eight doublebasses.	Chamber music	Fernando Manassero	12:00	Argentina
2011	retorno, for sextet.	Chamber music	Luciano Azzigotti	7:00	Argentina
2011	Epinicios y Agonales, para running singers and interactive system	Musical game	Luciano Azzigotti	40:00	Argentina
2012	FreqCor, for French horn	Solo	Ezequiel Dobrovsky	15:00	Argentina
2012	Pull it, for French horn and video	Solo and video	Patricia Martinez	8:00	Argentina
2013	Duo para Cornista y Chelista, for French horn and cello	Chamber music	Luciano Kulikov	12:00	Argentina
2013	Palimpsesto, for French horn and cello	Chamber music	Rosa Nolly	12:00	Argentina
2013	Trum'ta, for two percussionists	Chamber music	Fernando Manassero	7:00	Argentina
2013	MicrobeatLogic, for two percussionists	Chamber music	Luciano Azzigotti	8:00	Argentina
2013	Luz, for two percussionists	Chamber music	Kevin Juillerat	5:00	Switzerland
2013	Relatos Breves, for sextet	Chamber music	Juan Carlos Tolosa	32:00	Argentina
2014	Recurrence, for 8.1	Acousmatic music	Rodrigo Díaz	10:00	Peru
2014	Sounds of the dark times, octet	Chamber music	Alexander Khubeev [premiada]	12:00	Russia
2014	Tris, quartet and video	Video-music	Valentín Pelisch	10:00	Argentina
2015	Márgenes, for A cl., trb. perc. pno. cb	Chamber music	Agustín Salzano	10:00	Argentina
2015	El abismal silencio de la cosa, for violin and piano	Chamber music	Ariel Gonzalez Losada	13:00	Argentina
2015	Almost close, for piano, electronic and video	Solo	Marco Momi	12:00	Italy
2015	Ampliación de lo disponible, for sextet	Chamber music	Lucas Luján	13:00	Argentina
2015	Sensitive Switch, for trombon and violoncello	Chamber music	Santiago Diez Fischer	7:00	Argentina
2015	Instant Factory, para quinteto	Chamber music	Santiago Villalba	14:00	Argentina
2016	Traza, for string quartet and percussion duo	Chamber music	Gabriel Valverde	~	Argentina
2017	Lumia B, for organ	Music for organ	Luciano Kulikov	10:00	Argentina
2017	Haz de luz, for organ and soprano	Vocal Music + organ	Agustina Crespo	~	Argentina
2017	De Roperos Ventanas Y Otros Muebles En Desuso, for organ	Music for organ	Nicolás Varchauvsky	8:00	Argentina
2017	El nombre en la punta de la lengua, for organ	Music for organ	Carolina Carrizo	6:00	Argentina
2018	dozens of canons: Anaïs Faivre Haumonté, for violoncello*	Solo	Evan Johnson	12:00	United States
2018	Las cosas mudas for chamber ensemble, percussion and video*	Chamber music	Carolina Carrizo	10:00	Argentina

The production is a co-production with Teatro Argentino de La Plata, with funding provided by the Ernst von Siemens Musikstiftung.

== Chronology of concerts ==
=== 2011 ===
- Música Rusa y Argentina
- Electrónica Inestable
- Epinicios y Agonales

=== 2012 ===
- This is my conDiTion
- Cosas extendidas
- Music of Taste
- Delphine Gauthier Guiche

=== 2013 ===
- Martin Devoto
- Minka1
- conDiT | Gaudeamus Muzikweek | Modelo62 Composition Award final stage
- Modelo62
- Institute of Sonoloy, Den Haag
- Martijn Tellinga
- Martin Devoto & Delphine Gauthier Guiche
- reConvert Project | Latinoamerican Tour
- reConvert Project @TACEC Teatro Argentino de La Plata
- reConvert Project | Percussion's workshop works of participants
- Córdoba en Buenos Aires | Suonomobile Argentina
- Minka2
- Manos a las obras | Haydée Schvartz y Elías Gurevich

=== 2014 ===
- Traces of the unpresent present or the present unpresent | Christine Schörkhuber
- Akousmatikon
- Expanded Voices
- Marcelo Toledo seminar and flute works
- Transatlantic Interscores | Viena
- Transatlantic Interscores | Darmstadt
- Tañidos | Bruno Lo Bianco y Sebastian Pereira
- Reflective | Reiko Yamada [Instalación y residencia]
- Ensamble DAMus IUNA
- Escrituras Argentinas [coproducción con el Cíclo de Música Contemporánea del TGSM]
- Noid [Au]

=== 2015 ===
- Ensamble Tropi
- Microtunings
- conDiT LAB 1
- Heloisa Amaral & Karin Hellqvist

conDIT.scime [expanded music concerts serie]

- Rei Nakamura
- Michael Maierhof | Solo
- Nadar Ensemble
- Infinite Land

=== 2016 ===
- Andreas Trobollowitsch
- Divka trio | Music & Cinema
- MEI Music for flutes
- reConvert project
- Ensamble Coral Cámara Siglo XXI

=== 2017 ===
New Music for organ

== Press ==
- «el conDIT, una forma de llevar la música al barrio / TELAM, 30 de Agosto de 2013 », by Agustín Argento, in:.
- «Semana de conciertos en el Distrito Tecnológico | La Nación ADN 26 de abril de 2013 », by Natalia Blanc, in: .
- «Desde Holanda, un ciclo de música contemporánea: Ensamble Modelo62 / La Nación / 24 de abril de 2013», by Pablo Gianera, in: .
- «Operación Escuchar: La notable movida en el cheLA / Página 12 Suplemento NO, 16 de mayo de 2013», by Santiago Rial Ungaro, in: .
- «El Ensamble Modelo62 en Buenos Aires | Un debut con conciertos y concurso / Página 12 Espectáculos 24 de abril de 2013

», in: .

- «Vanguardias criollas e Ideología Ruidista | Concierto Escrituras Argentinas en el auditorio cheLA / Diario Clarín 12 Opinión 21 de noviembre de 2014

», in: .
