= Condit =

Condit or Conditt is a surname. Notable people with the surname include:

- Azubah Caroline Condit (1810–1844), American missionary in Indonesia
- Carl W. Condit (1914–1997), historian of Chicago architecture
- Carlos Condit (born 1984), American mixed martial arts fighter
- Cecelia Condit (born 1947), American artist working in video
- Celeste Condit (born 1965), American professor and scholar of rhetorical criticism
- Donnie Condit (born 1956), American politician
- Elbert Nevius Condit (1846–1900), American Presbyterian minister and college president
- Fillmore Condit (1855–1939), American inventor, temperance activist and politician
- Frederick Condit (1852–1933), American lawyer and politician
- Gary Condit (born 1948), American politician
- George Conditt IV (born 2000), Puerto Rican basketball player
- Ira J. Condit (1883–1900), American horticulturist
- James DeMott Condit (1821–1863), American politician
- John Condit (1755–1834), American politician, senator from New Jersey, and father of Silas Condit
- Margaret Conditt, American politician
- Mark Anthony Conditt, alleged perpetrator of the Austin serial bombings in 2018
- Merl Condit (1917–1992), American National Football League player
- Philip M. Condit (born 1941), American businessman, former chairman and CEO of Boeing
- Samantha Knox Condit (1837–1912), American teacher and Presbyterian missionary in the Chinese community of San Francisco
- Silas Condit (1778–1861), American politician
