= Dan Bradley (geneticist) =

Northern Irish geneticist

Professor Daniel Bradley FRS MRIA
- Born: Maghera, Northern Ireland
- Education: Cambridge University, Trinity College Dublin
- Known for: Ancient genomics, Livestock domestication, Population genetics
- Awards: Fellow of the Royal Society (2024), Royal Irish Academy Gold Medal (2020), Member of the Royal Irish Academy (2009)
- Scientific career
- Fields: Genetics, Ancient DNA, Population genomics
- Workplaces: Trinity College Dublin

Daniel Gerard Bradley is a Northern Irish geneticist and Professor of Population Genetics. He is based at Trinity College Dublin, where he holds a Personal Chair in Population Genetics. Bradley has worked in ancient DNA, livestock genomics, and the genetic history of the British Isles and the Fertile Crescent.

== Early life and education ==
Bradley was born in Maghera, Northern Ireland, and was educated at St Patrick’s College, Maghera. He earned a B.A. (Hons.) from Cambridge University in 1986 and completed a Ph.D. at Trinity College Dublin in 1991.

== Career ==
Bradley began his academic career in as a research fellow and project coordinator in the Department of Genetics at Trinity College Dublin. He was appointed lecturer in 1994, elected a Fellow of the College in 2000, and awarded a Personal Chair in Population Genetics in 2008. He served as Head of the School of Genetics and Microbiology from 2018 to 2021.

== Research ==
Bradley has worked on ancient DNA and population genomics, especially in the study of human prehistory and animal domestication. His laboratory was the first to identify the petrous temporal bone as a highly effective substrate for ancient DNA preservation, work that enabled high-resolution sequencing of prehistoric human genomes. These discoveries have shed light on early population movements across Europe, including major genomic transitions during the Neolithic and Bronze Ages in the British Isles, and revealed aspects of ancient societies, such as Mendelian disease variants and even the earliest known case of Down syndrome in prehistory.

His research into ancient Irish genomes revealed evidence of elite incestuous practices within Neolithic societies, notably at the Newgrange passage tomb. He has also led studies suggesting significant matrilocal traditions in Iron Age Britain, challenging prior assumptions of exclusively patrilocal societies in prehistoric Europe.

In the field of livestock genomics, Bradley’s work has clarified the mosaic origins of domesticated cattle, sheep, and goats, and demonstrated that animal domestication in the Near East involved multiple wild populations and early evidence of human-driven selection.

Bradley is also co-founder of Identigen Ltd, a genetic testing company that pioneered DNA-based food traceability and played a central role in uncovering the 2013 horse meat contamination scandal in Europe. The company was acquired by Merck Animal Health in 2020.

== Honours and awards ==
- Elected Fellow of the Royal Society (2024)
- Awarded the Royal Irish Academy Gold Medal in the Life Sciences (2020)
- Elected Member of the Royal Irish Academy (2009)
- Elected Fellow of Trinity College Dublin (2000)

== Media and outreach ==
Bradley's research has received media coverage, including in The New York Times, BBC, The Guardian, Le Monde, Science, National Geographic, and New Scientist. He has appeared in several broadcast documentaries including:

- Blood of the Irish (RTÉ, 2009)
- DNA Caillte (TG4, 2020)
- From That Small Island (COCO Content, forthcoming)

He has contributed to exhibitions at the Brú na Bóinne Visitor Centre and the National Museum of Ireland, and is active in public engagement, especially in his home region of Northern Ireland.
