= Stephen Condit House =

Historic house in New Jersey, United States

- U.S. National Register of Historic Places
- New Jersey Register of Historic Places
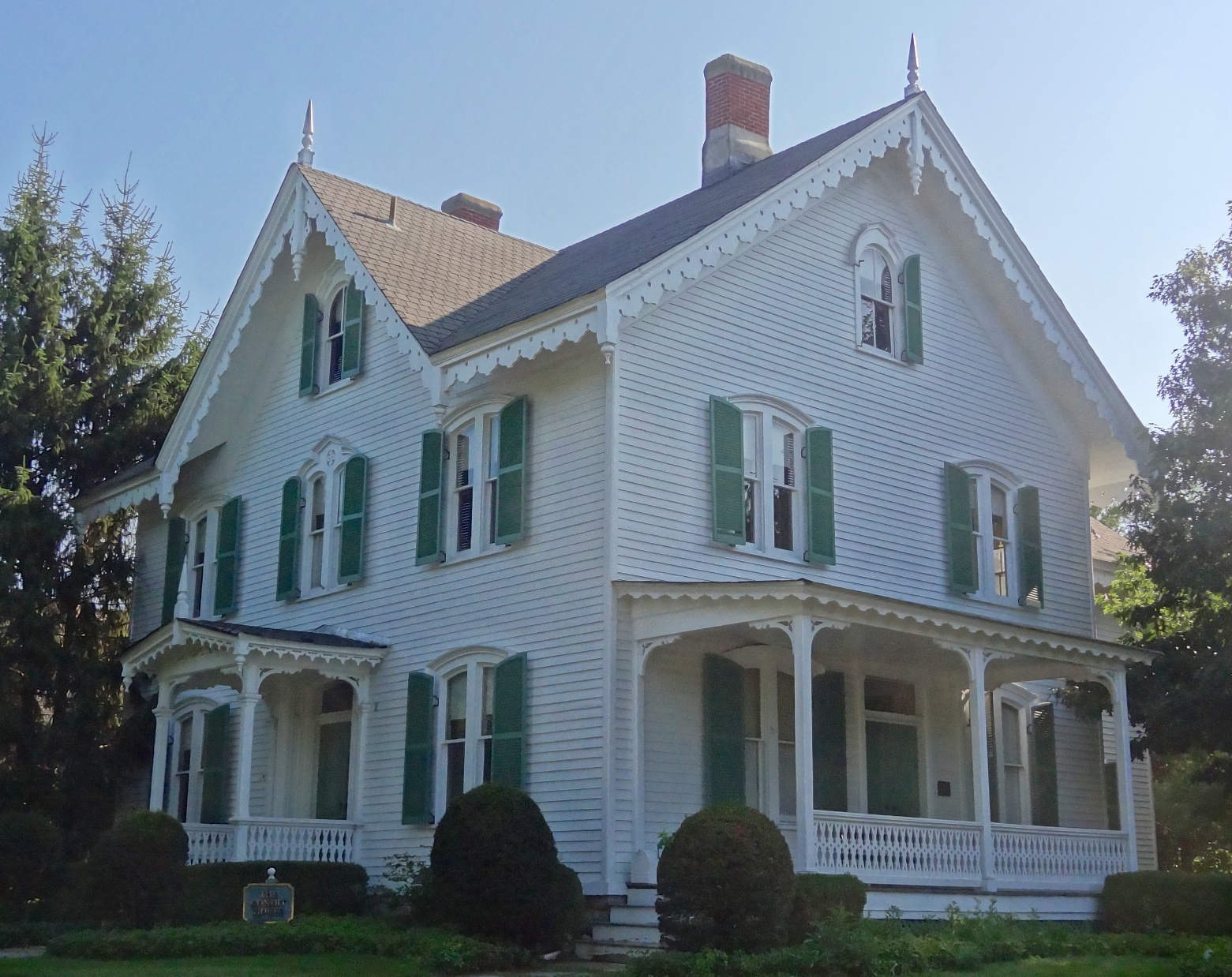

- Location within Morris County, New Jersey Location within New Jersey Location within the United States
- Nearest city: Parsippany, New Jersey
- Coordinates: 40°51′51″N 74°23′4″W
- Built: c. 1870
- Architectural style: Late Victorian
- NRHP reference No.: 74001187
- NJRHP No.: 2214

Significant dates
- Added to NRHP: February 15, 1974
- Designated NJRHP: November 20, 1973

The Stephen Condit House is a historic farmhouse located on Beverwyck Road in the township of Parsippany–Troy Hills in Morris County, New Jersey, United States. Built around 1870, it was added to the National Register of Historic Places on February 15, 1974, for its significance in architecture and community history.

== History and description ==
Stephen Condit (1768–1816) purchased a farm here around 1800 and established a tanning and currying operation. His son, John Ogden Condit (1797–1866), inherited the farm after his death. John's son, Stephen Hobert Condit (1830–1909), owned the property next and built the farmhouse around 1870. The two and one-half story frame building features Victorian architecture. According to the National Park Service, the front porch showcases decorative woodwork, including a finial and pendants.

== See also ==
- National Register of Historic Places listings in Morris County, New Jersey
- Morris County History, A Bevy-wyck of Condits
