= Condit House =

Historic house in Indiana, United States

- U.S. National Register of Historic Places
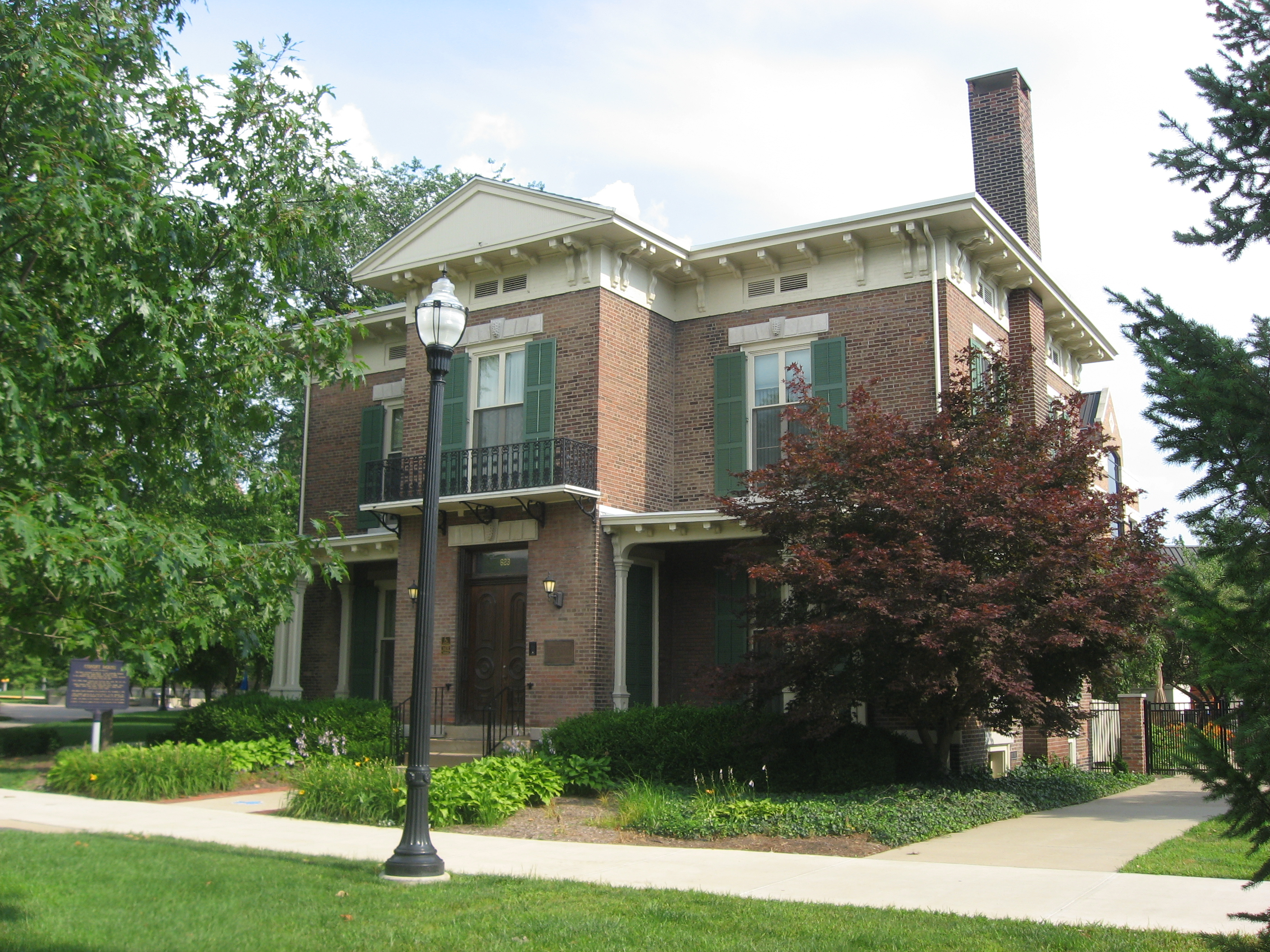
- Front and side of the house

- Location within Vigo County, Indiana Location within Indiana Location within the United States
- Location: 629 Mulberry St. on Indiana State University campus, Terre Haute, Indiana
- Coordinates: 39°28′6″N 87°24′32″W
- Area: 0.2 acres (0.081 ha)
- Built: 1860
- Architect: Jabez Hedden
- Architectural style: Italianate
- NRHP reference No.: 73000023
- Added to NRHP: April 2, 1973

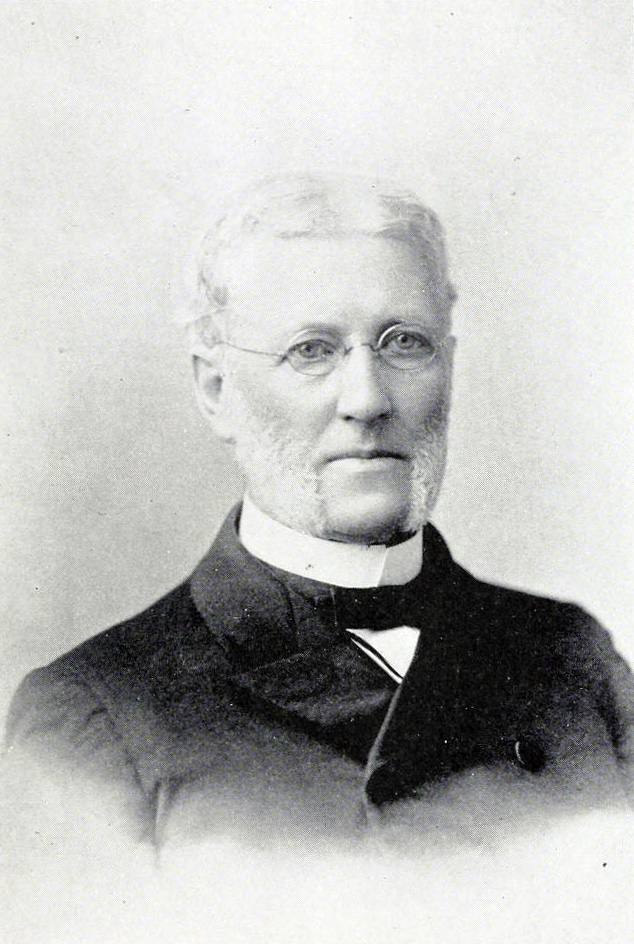
Blackford Condit circa 1894

The Condit House is the Official Residence of the President of Indiana State University. Built in 1860 and bequeathed to the university in 1962, it is the oldest building on the campus. The home, an example of Italianate architecture, was the private home of the Right Reverend Blackford Condit and his family from 1862 until 1962. Condit's youngest daughter, Helen, donated the home to the university upon her death.

In addition to its role as the Official Residence, it previously served as the University Alumni Center.

The architect was Jabez Hedden and the contractor was Lucien Houriet. It was listed on the National Register of Historic Places in 1973.
