= Veronica Augustyn =

American materials scientist and academic

- Education: University of Arizona; University of California, Los Angeles
- Scientific career
- Workplaces: University of Texas at Austin; North Carolina State University
- Thesis: Characterization of nanostructured materials for lithium-ion batteries and electrochemical capacitors (2013)
- Website: Augustyn Group

Veronica Augustyn is an American materials scientist who is a professor and the Jake & Jennifer Hooks Distinguished Scholar in Materials Science & Engineering at North Carolina State University. Her research considers the behavior of materials at electrochemical interfaces for next-generation technologies.

== Early life and education ==
Augustyn was an undergraduate student in materials science at the University of Arizona. She moved to the University of California, Los Angeles for graduate studies, where she completed a doctorate in materials science. Her research considered nanostructure materials for lithium-ion batteries and electrochemical capacitors. After earning her PhD, Augustyn moved to the Materials Institute at University of Texas at Austin where she spent two years as a postdoctoral fellow.

== Research and career ==
Augustyn joined North Carolina State University in 2015. Her research considers next-generation energy materials for environmental technologies. These include layered metal oxides, which show potential for electrochemical energy storage materials.

Augustyn joined the Journal of Materials Chemistry A as associate editor in 2021. Together with John Paul Eneku, Augustyn leads SciBridge, a science program that connects scientists in the United States with those working in Africa.

== Selected publications ==
- Veronica Augustyn; Jérémy Come; Michael A Lowe; et al. (April 14, 2013). "High-rate electrochemical energy storage through Li+ intercalation pseudocapacitance". Nature Materials. 12 (6): 518–522. doi:10.1038/nmat3601. ISSN 1476-1122. PMID 23584143. Wikidata Q43526337.
- Augustyn, Veronica; Simon, Patrice; Dunn, Bruce (2014). "Pseudocapacitive oxide materials for high-rate electrochemical energy storage" (PDF). Energy & Environmental Science. 7 (5): 1597. doi:10.1039/c3ee44164d. ISSN 1754-5692. S2CID 22211583.
- Simon Fleischmann; James B Mitchell; Ruocun Wang; Cheng Zhan; De-en Jiang; Volker Presser; Veronica Augustyn (June 28, 2020). "Pseudocapacitance: From Fundamental Understanding to High Power Energy Storage Materials". Chemical Reviews. doi:10.1021/acs.chemrev.0c00170. ISSN 0009-2665. PMID 32597172. Wikidata Q96767752.
- Zuhuang Chen; Veronica Augustyn; Jing Wen; Yuewei Zhang; Meiqing Shen; Bruce Dunn; Yunfeng Lu (February 1, 2011). "High-performance supercapacitors based on intertwined CNT/V2O5 nanowire nanocomposites". Advanced Materials. 23 (6): 791–795. doi:10.1002/adma.201003658. ISSN 0935-9648. PMID 21287644. Wikidata Q46649897.
