= List of minor planets: 413001–414000 =

The following is a partial list of minor planets, running from minor-planet number 413001 through 414000, inclusive. The primary data for this and other partial lists is based on JPL's "Small-Body Orbital Elements" and data available from the Minor Planet Center. Critical list information is also provided by the MPC, unless otherwise specified from Lowell Observatory. A detailed description of the table's columns and additional sources are given on the main page including a complete list of every page in this series, and a statistical break-up on the dynamical classification of minor planets.

Also see the summary list of all named bodies in numerical and alphabetical order, and the corresponding naming citations for the number range of this particular list. New namings may only be added to this list after official publication, as the preannouncement of names is condemned by the Working Group for Small Bodies Nomenclature of the International Astronomical Union.

| Near-Earth obj. | MBA (inner) | MBA (outer) | Centaur |
| Mars-crosser | MBA (middle) | Jupiter trojan | Trans-Neptunian obj. |
| Unclassified |

== 413001–413100 ==
| Designation | | | Discovery | | | Properties | | Ref |
| Permanent | Provisional | Named after | Date | Site | Discoverer(s) | Category | Diam. | Ref |
|---|---|---|---|---|---|---|---|---|
| 413001 | 1999 UR_{30} | — | October 31, 1999 | Kitt Peak | Spacewatch | · | 980 m | MPC · JPL |
| 413002 | 1999 VG_{22} | — | November 11, 1999 | Catalina | CSS | AMO | 600 m | MPC · JPL |
| 413003 | 1999 VK_{119} | — | November 3, 1999 | Kitt Peak | Spacewatch | · | 1.1 km | MPC · JPL |
| 413004 | 1999 VY_{121} | — | November 4, 1999 | Kitt Peak | Spacewatch | · | 950 m | MPC · JPL |
| 413005 | 1999 VR_{124} | — | November 10, 1999 | Kitt Peak | Spacewatch | · | 2.0 km | MPC · JPL |
| 413006 | 1999 VH_{154} | — | November 12, 1999 | Kitt Peak | Spacewatch | 3:2 | 3.3 km | MPC · JPL |
| 413007 | 1999 VP_{181} | — | October 19, 1999 | Kitt Peak | Spacewatch | · | 1.1 km | MPC · JPL |
| 413008 | 1999 VP_{197} | — | November 3, 1999 | Catalina | CSS | · | 1.3 km | MPC · JPL |
| 413009 | 1999 VF_{210} | — | November 12, 1999 | Socorro | LINEAR | · | 1.0 km | MPC · JPL |
| 413010 | 2000 CV_{39} | — | February 2, 2000 | Socorro | LINEAR | · | 1.7 km | MPC · JPL |
| 413011 | 2000 FY_{7} | — | March 30, 2000 | Prescott | P. G. Comba | · | 4.1 km | MPC · JPL |
| 413012 | 2000 GU_{149} | — | April 5, 2000 | Socorro | LINEAR | · | 1.8 km | MPC · JPL |
| 413013 | 2000 HP_{45} | — | April 28, 2000 | Kitt Peak | Spacewatch | · | 630 m | MPC · JPL |
| 413014 | 2000 NB_{8} | — | July 5, 2000 | Kitt Peak | Spacewatch | · | 810 m | MPC · JPL |
| 413015 | 2000 QT_{114} | — | August 24, 2000 | Socorro | LINEAR | · | 2.3 km | MPC · JPL |
| 413016 | 2000 QA_{221} | — | August 21, 2000 | Anderson Mesa | LONEOS | · | 830 m | MPC · JPL |
| 413017 | 2000 QG_{231} | — | August 29, 2000 | Socorro | LINEAR | · | 1.8 km | MPC · JPL |
| 413018 | 2000 SN_{93} | — | September 23, 2000 | Socorro | LINEAR | · | 2.2 km | MPC · JPL |
| 413019 | 2000 SB_{94} | — | September 23, 2000 | Socorro | LINEAR | V | 660 m | MPC · JPL |
| 413020 | 2000 SH_{130} | — | September 22, 2000 | Socorro | LINEAR | · | 3.1 km | MPC · JPL |
| 413021 | 2000 SY_{162} | — | September 28, 2000 | Socorro | LINEAR | AMO | 460 m | MPC · JPL |
| 413022 | 2000 SN_{250} | — | September 24, 2000 | Socorro | LINEAR | · | 1.8 km | MPC · JPL |
| 413023 | 2000 TR_{31} | — | October 5, 2000 | Kitt Peak | Spacewatch | · | 2.6 km | MPC · JPL |
| 413024 | 2000 TS_{51} | — | October 1, 2000 | Socorro | LINEAR | · | 720 m | MPC · JPL |
| 413025 | 2000 UA_{4} | — | October 24, 2000 | Socorro | LINEAR | · | 930 m | MPC · JPL |
| 413026 | 2000 UU_{38} | — | October 24, 2000 | Socorro | LINEAR | · | 1 km | MPC · JPL |
| 413027 | 2000 UF_{59} | — | October 25, 2000 | Socorro | LINEAR | · | 2.0 km | MPC · JPL |
| 413028 | 2000 UV_{72} | — | October 25, 2000 | Socorro | LINEAR | DOR | 3.5 km | MPC · JPL |
| 413029 | 2000 UB_{109} | — | October 31, 2000 | Socorro | LINEAR | · | 2.1 km | MPC · JPL |
| 413030 | 2000 WC_{66} | — | November 19, 2000 | Socorro | LINEAR | PHO | 1.1 km | MPC · JPL |
| 413031 | 2000 WQ_{133} | — | November 19, 2000 | Socorro | LINEAR | · | 2.8 km | MPC · JPL |
| 413032 | 2000 XF_{27} | — | December 4, 2000 | Socorro | LINEAR | · | 1.1 km | MPC · JPL |
| 413033 Aerts | 2000 XU_{53} | Aerts | December 4, 2000 | Uccle | T. Pauwels | · | 1.3 km | MPC · JPL |
| 413034 | 2000 YM_{23} | — | December 28, 2000 | Kitt Peak | Spacewatch | · | 790 m | MPC · JPL |
| 413035 | 2001 AQ_{49} | — | January 15, 2001 | Kitt Peak | Spacewatch | 3:2 · SHU | 5.1 km | MPC · JPL |
| 413036 | 2001 KO_{34} | — | May 18, 2001 | Socorro | LINEAR | · | 1.2 km | MPC · JPL |
| 413037 | 2001 KN_{51} | — | May 25, 2001 | Socorro | LINEAR | · | 3.3 km | MPC · JPL |
| 413038 | 2001 MF_{1} | — | June 16, 2001 | Anderson Mesa | LONEOS | AMO +1km | 1.2 km | MPC · JPL |
| 413039 | 2001 NB_{12} | — | July 13, 2001 | Palomar | NEAT | · | 1.2 km | MPC · JPL |
| 413040 | 2001 OS_{75} | — | July 24, 2001 | Palomar | NEAT | · | 1.4 km | MPC · JPL |
| 413041 | 2001 PL_{35} | — | August 11, 2001 | Palomar | NEAT | · | 2.7 km | MPC · JPL |
| 413042 | 2001 PG_{43} | — | August 12, 2001 | Haleakala | NEAT | · | 1.5 km | MPC · JPL |
| 413043 | 2001 QM_{65} | — | August 17, 2001 | Socorro | LINEAR | · | 1.6 km | MPC · JPL |
| 413044 | 2001 QU_{108} | — | August 23, 2001 | Socorro | LINEAR | · | 1.4 km | MPC · JPL |
| 413045 | 2001 QS_{151} | — | August 24, 2001 | Anderson Mesa | LONEOS | H | 560 m | MPC · JPL |
| 413046 | 2001 QL_{161} | — | August 23, 2001 | Anderson Mesa | LONEOS | · | 1.2 km | MPC · JPL |
| 413047 | 2001 QC_{177} | — | August 24, 2001 | Socorro | LINEAR | · | 1.3 km | MPC · JPL |
| 413048 | 2001 QA_{188} | — | August 21, 2001 | Haleakala | NEAT | ADE | 2.3 km | MPC · JPL |
| 413049 | 2001 QY_{196} | — | August 22, 2001 | Haleakala | NEAT | ADE | 2.7 km | MPC · JPL |
| 413050 | 2001 QR_{227} | — | August 24, 2001 | Anderson Mesa | LONEOS | · | 1.6 km | MPC · JPL |
| 413051 | 2001 QT_{280} | — | August 19, 2001 | Socorro | LINEAR | · | 1.6 km | MPC · JPL |
| 413052 | 2001 QM_{330} | — | August 25, 2001 | Socorro | LINEAR | · | 1.8 km | MPC · JPL |
| 413053 | 2001 RY_{12} | — | September 8, 2001 | Socorro | LINEAR | MAR | 1.3 km | MPC · JPL |
| 413054 | 2001 RB_{35} | — | September 8, 2001 | Socorro | LINEAR | · | 1.5 km | MPC · JPL |
| 413055 | 2001 RV_{48} | — | September 11, 2001 | Socorro | LINEAR | · | 1 km | MPC · JPL |
| 413056 | 2001 RA_{87} | — | August 27, 2001 | Anderson Mesa | LONEOS | · | 1.5 km | MPC · JPL |
| 413057 | 2001 RN_{108} | — | September 12, 2001 | Socorro | LINEAR | (5) | 1.4 km | MPC · JPL |
| 413058 | 2001 RZ_{120} | — | September 12, 2001 | Socorro | LINEAR | · | 800 m | MPC · JPL |
| 413059 | 2001 RU_{121} | — | September 12, 2001 | Socorro | LINEAR | · | 2.2 km | MPC · JPL |
| 413060 | 2001 RM_{132} | — | September 12, 2001 | Socorro | LINEAR | · | 590 m | MPC · JPL |
| 413061 | 2001 RX_{145} | — | September 8, 2001 | Socorro | LINEAR | · | 930 m | MPC · JPL |
| 413062 | 2001 SA_{23} | — | September 10, 2001 | Anderson Mesa | LONEOS | · | 1.5 km | MPC · JPL |
| 413063 | 2001 SC_{36} | — | September 16, 2001 | Socorro | LINEAR | · | 1.6 km | MPC · JPL |
| 413064 | 2001 SG_{88} | — | September 12, 2001 | Socorro | LINEAR | · | 1.2 km | MPC · JPL |
| 413065 | 2001 SX_{96} | — | August 22, 2001 | Kitt Peak | Spacewatch | · | 1.2 km | MPC · JPL |
| 413066 | 2001 SG_{116} | — | September 18, 2001 | Palomar | NEAT | · | 1.5 km | MPC · JPL |
| 413067 | 2001 SF_{117} | — | August 24, 2001 | Anderson Mesa | LONEOS | · | 1.4 km | MPC · JPL |
| 413068 | 2001 SB_{121} | — | September 16, 2001 | Socorro | LINEAR | · | 1.4 km | MPC · JPL |
| 413069 | 2001 SR_{122} | — | September 16, 2001 | Socorro | LINEAR | · | 1.8 km | MPC · JPL |
| 413070 | 2001 SG_{175} | — | September 16, 2001 | Socorro | LINEAR | · | 1.7 km | MPC · JPL |
| 413071 | 2001 SR_{184} | — | September 19, 2001 | Socorro | LINEAR | · | 1.2 km | MPC · JPL |
| 413072 | 2001 SD_{248} | — | September 19, 2001 | Socorro | LINEAR | JUN | 840 m | MPC · JPL |
| 413073 | 2001 SG_{264} | — | September 25, 2001 | Socorro | LINEAR | · | 2.8 km | MPC · JPL |
| 413074 | 2001 SL_{306} | — | September 20, 2001 | Socorro | LINEAR | (5) | 1.2 km | MPC · JPL |
| 413075 | 2001 SW_{306} | — | September 20, 2001 | Socorro | LINEAR | (1547) | 2.0 km | MPC · JPL |
| 413076 | 2001 SF_{312} | — | September 20, 2001 | Socorro | LINEAR | · | 1.3 km | MPC · JPL |
| 413077 | 2001 SK_{321} | — | August 26, 2001 | Anderson Mesa | LONEOS | EUN | 1.4 km | MPC · JPL |
| 413078 | 2001 SZ_{321} | — | September 25, 2001 | Socorro | LINEAR | · | 1.7 km | MPC · JPL |
| 413079 | 2001 SN_{325} | — | September 17, 2001 | Palomar | NEAT | EUN | 2.0 km | MPC · JPL |
| 413080 | 2001 TH_{17} | — | September 20, 2001 | Socorro | LINEAR | · | 790 m | MPC · JPL |
| 413081 | 2001 TP_{23} | — | October 14, 2001 | Socorro | LINEAR | · | 1.4 km | MPC · JPL |
| 413082 | 2001 TQ_{102} | — | October 15, 2001 | Socorro | LINEAR | · | 1.7 km | MPC · JPL |
| 413083 | 2001 TL_{103} | — | October 14, 2001 | Socorro | LINEAR | H | 500 m | MPC · JPL |
| 413084 | 2001 TJ_{123} | — | October 12, 2001 | Haleakala | NEAT | · | 2.9 km | MPC · JPL |
| 413085 | 2001 TE_{140} | — | September 12, 2001 | Socorro | LINEAR | HNS | 1.4 km | MPC · JPL |
| 413086 | 2001 TG_{166} | — | October 15, 2001 | Socorro | LINEAR | ADE | 2.0 km | MPC · JPL |
| 413087 | 2001 TA_{174} | — | October 14, 2001 | Socorro | LINEAR | · | 1.4 km | MPC · JPL |
| 413088 | 2001 TE_{230} | — | September 23, 2001 | Socorro | LINEAR | · | 1.4 km | MPC · JPL |
| 413089 | 2001 TZ_{254} | — | October 14, 2001 | Apache Point | SDSS | · | 1.5 km | MPC · JPL |
| 413090 | 2001 UH_{11} | — | October 17, 2001 | Socorro | LINEAR | BAR | 1.6 km | MPC · JPL |
| 413091 | 2001 UV_{16} | — | October 23, 2001 | Palomar | NEAT | AMO +1km | 810 m | MPC · JPL |
| 413092 | 2001 UM_{18} | — | October 16, 2001 | Kitt Peak | Spacewatch | · | 1.3 km | MPC · JPL |
| 413093 | 2001 UF_{31} | — | October 16, 2001 | Socorro | LINEAR | · | 1.4 km | MPC · JPL |
| 413094 | 2001 UK_{37} | — | October 17, 2001 | Socorro | LINEAR | · | 580 m | MPC · JPL |
| 413095 | 2001 UC_{56} | — | October 17, 2001 | Socorro | LINEAR | · | 780 m | MPC · JPL |
| 413096 | 2001 UY_{60} | — | September 20, 2001 | Socorro | LINEAR | · | 650 m | MPC · JPL |
| 413097 | 2001 UB_{78} | — | September 20, 2001 | Socorro | LINEAR | · | 2.2 km | MPC · JPL |
| 413098 | 2001 UW_{91} | — | October 18, 2001 | Palomar | NEAT | · | 2.1 km | MPC · JPL |
| 413099 | 2001 UL_{96} | — | October 17, 2001 | Socorro | LINEAR | · | 1.5 km | MPC · JPL |
| 413100 | 2001 UE_{106} | — | October 20, 2001 | Socorro | LINEAR | · | 1.5 km | MPC · JPL |

== 413101–413200 ==
back to top

| Designation | | | Discovery | | | Properties | | Ref |
| Permanent | Provisional | Named after | Date | Site | Discoverer(s) | Category | Diam. | Ref |
|---|---|---|---|---|---|---|---|---|
| 413101 | 2001 UC_{134} | — | October 21, 2001 | Socorro | LINEAR | MIS | 2.6 km | MPC · JPL |
| 413102 | 2001 UK_{134} | — | October 13, 2001 | Kitt Peak | Spacewatch | · | 1.9 km | MPC · JPL |
| 413103 | 2001 UT_{142} | — | October 10, 2001 | Kitt Peak | Spacewatch | · | 1.1 km | MPC · JPL |
| 413104 | 2001 UM_{162} | — | October 23, 2001 | Socorro | LINEAR | · | 1.9 km | MPC · JPL |
| 413105 | 2001 UM_{163} | — | October 23, 2001 | Socorro | LINEAR | · | 680 m | MPC · JPL |
| 413106 | 2001 UV_{176} | — | October 21, 2001 | Socorro | LINEAR | · | 1.4 km | MPC · JPL |
| 413107 | 2001 UM_{196} | — | October 17, 2001 | Kitt Peak | Spacewatch | · | 1.7 km | MPC · JPL |
| 413108 | 2001 VN_{4} | — | November 9, 2001 | Socorro | LINEAR | · | 930 m | MPC · JPL |
| 413109 | 2001 VZ_{4} | — | November 11, 2001 | Socorro | LINEAR | H | 730 m | MPC · JPL |
| 413110 | 2001 VZ_{49} | — | November 10, 2001 | Socorro | LINEAR | · | 1.6 km | MPC · JPL |
| 413111 | 2001 VS_{61} | — | November 10, 2001 | Socorro | LINEAR | · | 2.3 km | MPC · JPL |
| 413112 | 2001 VA_{72} | — | November 12, 2001 | Kvistaberg | Uppsala-DLR Asteroid Survey | · | 2.5 km | MPC · JPL |
| 413113 | 2001 VS_{111} | — | November 12, 2001 | Kitt Peak | Spacewatch | · | 2.0 km | MPC · JPL |
| 413114 | 2001 VF_{123} | — | November 14, 2001 | Kitt Peak | Spacewatch | ADE | 2.2 km | MPC · JPL |
| 413115 | 2001 VR_{133} | — | November 11, 2001 | Apache Point | SDSS | CYB | 3.5 km | MPC · JPL |
| 413116 | 2001 WK_{7} | — | November 17, 2001 | Socorro | LINEAR | · | 1.9 km | MPC · JPL |
| 413117 | 2001 WZ_{18} | — | November 17, 2001 | Socorro | LINEAR | · | 810 m | MPC · JPL |
| 413118 | 2001 WP_{25} | — | November 17, 2001 | Socorro | LINEAR | MIS | 2.0 km | MPC · JPL |
| 413119 | 2001 WL_{43} | — | November 18, 2001 | Socorro | LINEAR | · | 1.9 km | MPC · JPL |
| 413120 | 2001 WB_{44} | — | November 18, 2001 | Socorro | LINEAR | · | 1.4 km | MPC · JPL |
| 413121 | 2001 WL_{56} | — | October 26, 2001 | Socorro | LINEAR | · | 1.6 km | MPC · JPL |
| 413122 | 2001 WB_{102} | — | November 18, 2001 | Kitt Peak | Spacewatch | · | 670 m | MPC · JPL |
| 413123 | 2001 XS_{1} | — | December 9, 2001 | Socorro | LINEAR | AMO +1km | 1.3 km | MPC · JPL |
| 413124 | 2001 XN_{2} | — | December 8, 2001 | Socorro | LINEAR | H | 700 m | MPC · JPL |
| 413125 | 2001 XH_{5} | — | December 5, 2001 | Haleakala | NEAT | · | 840 m | MPC · JPL |
| 413126 | 2001 XU_{88} | — | December 14, 2001 | Uccle | H. M. J. Boffin | · | 2.4 km | MPC · JPL |
| 413127 | 2001 XN_{91} | — | December 10, 2001 | Socorro | LINEAR | JUN | 1.2 km | MPC · JPL |
| 413128 | 2001 XL_{104} | — | December 15, 2001 | Socorro | LINEAR | H | 590 m | MPC · JPL |
| 413129 | 2001 XY_{142} | — | December 14, 2001 | Socorro | LINEAR | · | 1.1 km | MPC · JPL |
| 413130 | 2001 XQ_{145} | — | December 14, 2001 | Socorro | LINEAR | · | 870 m | MPC · JPL |
| 413131 | 2001 XB_{188} | — | December 14, 2001 | Socorro | LINEAR | · | 1.4 km | MPC · JPL |
| 413132 | 2001 XR_{222} | — | November 17, 2001 | Kitt Peak | Spacewatch | · | 2.1 km | MPC · JPL |
| 413133 | 2001 YU_{1} | — | December 18, 2001 | Socorro | LINEAR | · | 3.8 km | MPC · JPL |
| 413134 | 2001 YY_{20} | — | November 20, 2001 | Socorro | LINEAR | H | 610 m | MPC · JPL |
| 413135 | 2001 YZ_{25} | — | December 18, 2001 | Socorro | LINEAR | · | 1.7 km | MPC · JPL |
| 413136 | 2001 YJ_{66} | — | December 18, 2001 | Socorro | LINEAR | · | 2.1 km | MPC · JPL |
| 413137 | 2001 YA_{72} | — | December 18, 2001 | Socorro | LINEAR | · | 1.3 km | MPC · JPL |
| 413138 | 2001 YV_{90} | — | December 17, 2001 | Palomar | NEAT | · | 2.0 km | MPC · JPL |
| 413139 | 2002 AU_{47} | — | January 9, 2002 | Socorro | LINEAR | · | 1.7 km | MPC · JPL |
| 413140 | 2002 AE_{156} | — | January 12, 2002 | Kitt Peak | Spacewatch | · | 1.6 km | MPC · JPL |
| 413141 | 2002 AW_{199} | — | January 8, 2002 | Socorro | LINEAR | (21344) | 1.6 km | MPC · JPL |
| 413142 | 2002 CT_{87} | — | February 7, 2002 | Socorro | LINEAR | · | 940 m | MPC · JPL |
| 413143 | 2002 CH_{89} | — | February 7, 2002 | Socorro | LINEAR | · | 910 m | MPC · JPL |
| 413144 | 2002 CL_{89} | — | February 7, 2002 | Socorro | LINEAR | GEF | 1.5 km | MPC · JPL |
| 413145 | 2002 CT_{142} | — | December 23, 2001 | Kitt Peak | Spacewatch | · | 1.8 km | MPC · JPL |
| 413146 | 2002 CP_{177} | — | January 5, 2002 | Kitt Peak | Spacewatch | · | 1.8 km | MPC · JPL |
| 413147 | 2002 CO_{180} | — | February 10, 2002 | Socorro | LINEAR | · | 870 m | MPC · JPL |
| 413148 | 2002 CQ_{249} | — | February 6, 2002 | Kitt Peak | M. W. Buie | · | 880 m | MPC · JPL |
| 413149 | 2002 CA_{257} | — | February 5, 2002 | Palomar | NEAT | · | 640 m | MPC · JPL |
| 413150 | 2002 ED_{9} | — | February 15, 2002 | Socorro | LINEAR | · | 2.3 km | MPC · JPL |
| 413151 | 2002 ER_{23} | — | March 5, 2002 | Kitt Peak | Spacewatch | KOR | 1.2 km | MPC · JPL |
| 413152 | 2002 ET_{67} | — | March 13, 2002 | Socorro | LINEAR | PHO | 1.2 km | MPC · JPL |
| 413153 | 2002 EN_{113} | — | March 10, 2002 | Kitt Peak | Spacewatch | · | 950 m | MPC · JPL |
| 413154 | 2002 EA_{128} | — | March 12, 2002 | Palomar | NEAT | · | 870 m | MPC · JPL |
| 413155 | 2002 FC_{3} | — | March 16, 2002 | Socorro | LINEAR | H | 690 m | MPC · JPL |
| 413156 | 2002 GS_{45} | — | April 4, 2002 | Kitt Peak | Spacewatch | PHO | 1.2 km | MPC · JPL |
| 413157 | 2002 GE_{59} | — | April 8, 2002 | Palomar | NEAT | · | 1.2 km | MPC · JPL |
| 413158 | 2002 GE_{64} | — | April 8, 2002 | Palomar | NEAT | · | 1.7 km | MPC · JPL |
| 413159 | 2002 GK_{103} | — | April 10, 2002 | Socorro | LINEAR | · | 930 m | MPC · JPL |
| 413160 | 2002 GV_{124} | — | April 12, 2002 | Socorro | LINEAR | (2076) | 1.0 km | MPC · JPL |
| 413161 | 2002 GB_{184} | — | April 5, 2002 | Palomar | NEAT | · | 1.2 km | MPC · JPL |
| 413162 | 2002 GW_{188} | — | April 9, 2002 | Palomar | NEAT | · | 1.1 km | MPC · JPL |
| 413163 | 2002 LB_{59} | — | April 21, 2002 | Kitt Peak | Spacewatch | · | 3.5 km | MPC · JPL |
| 413164 | 2002 NL_{59} | — | July 13, 2002 | Xinglong | SCAP | · | 3.8 km | MPC · JPL |
| 413165 | 2002 NZ_{69} | — | July 2, 2002 | Palomar | NEAT | THB | 5.8 km | MPC · JPL |
| 413166 | 2002 PY_{161} | — | August 8, 2002 | Palomar | S. F. Hönig | · | 2.9 km | MPC · JPL |
| 413167 | 2002 PX_{176} | — | August 11, 2002 | Palomar | NEAT | · | 3.9 km | MPC · JPL |
| 413168 | 2002 QA_{58} | — | August 28, 2002 | Palomar | R. Matson | · | 2.8 km | MPC · JPL |
| 413169 | 2002 QL_{81} | — | August 30, 2002 | Palomar | NEAT | · | 3.8 km | MPC · JPL |
| 413170 | 2002 QN_{82} | — | August 30, 2002 | Palomar | NEAT | VER | 2.8 km | MPC · JPL |
| 413171 | 2002 QP_{86} | — | August 17, 2002 | Palomar | NEAT | NYS | 930 m | MPC · JPL |
| 413172 | 2002 QJ_{93} | — | August 30, 2002 | Palomar | NEAT | · | 3.0 km | MPC · JPL |
| 413173 | 2002 QJ_{95} | — | August 18, 2002 | Palomar | NEAT | · | 3.7 km | MPC · JPL |
| 413174 | 2002 QA_{96} | — | August 16, 2002 | Palomar | NEAT | VER | 2.6 km | MPC · JPL |
| 413175 | 2002 QS_{96} | — | August 18, 2002 | Palomar | NEAT | NYS | 940 m | MPC · JPL |
| 413176 | 2002 QY_{103} | — | August 26, 2002 | Palomar | NEAT | · | 1.7 km | MPC · JPL |
| 413177 | 2002 QM_{112} | — | August 17, 2002 | Palomar | NEAT | · | 1.4 km | MPC · JPL |
| 413178 | 2002 QS_{116} | — | August 29, 2002 | Palomar | NEAT | MAS | 680 m | MPC · JPL |
| 413179 | 2002 QR_{139} | — | August 16, 2002 | Palomar | NEAT | · | 3.0 km | MPC · JPL |
| 413180 | 2002 RH_{1} | — | September 2, 2002 | Palomar | NEAT | · | 3.6 km | MPC · JPL |
| 413181 | 2002 RX_{73} | — | August 12, 2002 | Socorro | LINEAR | · | 3.3 km | MPC · JPL |
| 413182 | 2002 RS_{235} | — | September 11, 2002 | Palomar | White, M., M. Collins | · | 2.8 km | MPC · JPL |
| 413183 | 2002 RH_{243} | — | September 10, 2002 | Palomar | NEAT | · | 1.5 km | MPC · JPL |
| 413184 | 2002 RR_{247} | — | September 15, 2002 | Palomar | NEAT | · | 2.6 km | MPC · JPL |
| 413185 | 2002 RU_{250} | — | September 15, 2002 | Palomar | NEAT | THM | 2.1 km | MPC · JPL |
| 413186 | 2002 RZ_{250} | — | September 1, 2002 | Palomar | NEAT | · | 1.1 km | MPC · JPL |
| 413187 | 2002 RO_{282} | — | September 3, 2002 | Palomar | NEAT | · | 1.8 km | MPC · JPL |
| 413188 | 2002 TC_{310} | — | October 4, 2002 | Apache Point | SDSS | · | 3.0 km | MPC · JPL |
| 413189 | 2002 TK_{314} | — | October 4, 2002 | Apache Point | SDSS | · | 5.0 km | MPC · JPL |
| 413190 | 2002 TE_{350} | — | October 10, 2002 | Apache Point | SDSS | · | 3.2 km | MPC · JPL |
| 413191 | 2002 TO_{350} | — | October 10, 2002 | Apache Point | SDSS | · | 3.0 km | MPC · JPL |
| 413192 | 2002 VY_{94} | — | November 14, 2002 | Palomar | NEAT | T_{j} (2.78) · AMO +1km | 2.2 km | MPC · JPL |
| 413193 | 2002 VL_{105} | — | November 12, 2002 | Socorro | LINEAR | (5) | 1.5 km | MPC · JPL |
| 413194 | 2002 WA_{15} | — | November 28, 2002 | Anderson Mesa | LONEOS | · | 4.2 km | MPC · JPL |
| 413195 | 2002 WJ_{27} | — | November 24, 2002 | Palomar | NEAT | L5 | 8.0 km | MPC · JPL |
| 413196 | 2002 XU_{60} | — | December 5, 2002 | Socorro | LINEAR | H | 740 m | MPC · JPL |
| 413197 | 2002 XH_{78} | — | December 11, 2002 | Socorro | LINEAR | · | 3.5 km | MPC · JPL |
| 413198 | 2002 XE_{119} | — | December 10, 2002 | Palomar | NEAT | · | 970 m | MPC · JPL |
| 413199 | 2002 YB | — | December 19, 2002 | Haleakala | NEAT | · | 2.2 km | MPC · JPL |
| 413200 | 2003 AS_{77} | — | January 10, 2003 | Socorro | LINEAR | · | 2.0 km | MPC · JPL |

== 413201–413300 ==
back to top

| Designation | | | Discovery | | | Properties | | Ref |
| Permanent | Provisional | Named after | Date | Site | Discoverer(s) | Category | Diam. | Ref |
|---|---|---|---|---|---|---|---|---|
| 413201 | 2003 AB_{79} | — | January 10, 2003 | Kitt Peak | Spacewatch | (5) | 1.3 km | MPC · JPL |
| 413202 | 2003 AB_{82} | — | January 11, 2003 | Socorro | LINEAR | · | 1.9 km | MPC · JPL |
| 413203 | 2003 AM_{82} | — | January 13, 2003 | Socorro | LINEAR | · | 4.5 km | MPC · JPL |
| 413204 | 2003 BA_{14} | — | January 11, 2003 | Kitt Peak | Spacewatch | · | 1.3 km | MPC · JPL |
| 413205 | 2003 BN_{54} | — | January 27, 2003 | Palomar | NEAT | (5) | 1.2 km | MPC · JPL |
| 413206 | 2003 BS_{64} | — | January 30, 2003 | Palomar | NEAT | · | 1.4 km | MPC · JPL |
| 413207 | 2003 BW_{70} | — | January 31, 2003 | Kitt Peak | Spacewatch | · | 1.2 km | MPC · JPL |
| 413208 | 2003 BR_{83} | — | January 31, 2003 | Socorro | LINEAR | (5) | 1.4 km | MPC · JPL |
| 413209 | 2003 FF_{35} | — | March 23, 2003 | Kitt Peak | Spacewatch | · | 1.7 km | MPC · JPL |
| 413210 | 2003 FD_{93} | — | March 29, 2003 | Anderson Mesa | LONEOS | · | 2.4 km | MPC · JPL |
| 413211 | 2003 GD_{28} | — | April 7, 2003 | Socorro | LINEAR | · | 900 m | MPC · JPL |
| 413212 | 2003 GX_{35} | — | April 5, 2003 | Anderson Mesa | LONEOS | · | 1.9 km | MPC · JPL |
| 413213 | 2003 GC_{45} | — | April 8, 2003 | Palomar | NEAT | · | 650 m | MPC · JPL |
| 413214 | 2003 HY_{6} | — | April 24, 2003 | Kitt Peak | Spacewatch | · | 1.6 km | MPC · JPL |
| 413215 | 2003 JB_{1} | — | May 1, 2003 | Kitt Peak | Spacewatch | · | 650 m | MPC · JPL |
| 413216 | 2003 MA | — | June 16, 2003 | Anderson Mesa | LONEOS | AMO | 610 m | MPC · JPL |
| 413217 | 2003 PW_{3} | — | August 2, 2003 | Haleakala | NEAT | · | 1.7 km | MPC · JPL |
| 413218 | 2003 QU_{41} | — | August 22, 2003 | Socorro | LINEAR | · | 2.5 km | MPC · JPL |
| 413219 | 2003 QV_{72} | — | August 24, 2003 | Palomar | NEAT | · | 2.5 km | MPC · JPL |
| 413220 | 2003 QY_{81} | — | August 23, 2003 | Palomar | NEAT | · | 2.0 km | MPC · JPL |
| 413221 | 2003 QM_{87} | — | August 25, 2003 | Palomar | NEAT | · | 2.5 km | MPC · JPL |
| 413222 | 2003 QM_{95} | — | August 30, 2003 | Kitt Peak | Spacewatch | EOS | 2.1 km | MPC · JPL |
| 413223 | 2003 RT_{3} | — | September 1, 2003 | Socorro | LINEAR | V | 600 m | MPC · JPL |
| 413224 | 2003 RF_{9} | — | August 21, 2003 | Campo Imperatore | CINEOS | · | 1.2 km | MPC · JPL |
| 413225 | 2003 RD_{10} | — | September 2, 2003 | Bergisch Gladbach | W. Bickel | EOS | 2.2 km | MPC · JPL |
| 413226 | 2003 RC_{24} | — | September 15, 2003 | Anderson Mesa | LONEOS | PHO | 1.1 km | MPC · JPL |
| 413227 | 2003 SP_{22} | — | September 16, 2003 | Kitt Peak | Spacewatch | EUP | 3.7 km | MPC · JPL |
| 413228 | 2003 SM_{25} | — | September 17, 2003 | Kitt Peak | Spacewatch | · | 2.2 km | MPC · JPL |
| 413229 | 2003 SE_{63} | — | September 17, 2003 | Kitt Peak | Spacewatch | · | 1.1 km | MPC · JPL |
| 413230 | 2003 SB_{76} | — | September 18, 2003 | Kitt Peak | Spacewatch | · | 1.1 km | MPC · JPL |
| 413231 | 2003 SS_{89} | — | September 18, 2003 | Palomar | NEAT | EOS | 2.4 km | MPC · JPL |
| 413232 | 2003 SX_{118} | — | September 16, 2003 | Kitt Peak | Spacewatch | · | 2.1 km | MPC · JPL |
| 413233 Várkonyiágnes | 2003 SB_{129} | Várkonyiágnes | September 20, 2003 | Piszkéstető | K. Sárneczky, B. Sipőcz | · | 910 m | MPC · JPL |
| 413234 | 2003 SF_{136} | — | September 19, 2003 | Campo Imperatore | CINEOS | · | 910 m | MPC · JPL |
| 413235 | 2003 SW_{149} | — | September 17, 2003 | Socorro | LINEAR | · | 1.4 km | MPC · JPL |
| 413236 | 2003 SQ_{154} | — | September 19, 2003 | Anderson Mesa | LONEOS | · | 3.1 km | MPC · JPL |
| 413237 | 2003 SQ_{160} | — | September 22, 2003 | Kitt Peak | Spacewatch | · | 1.1 km | MPC · JPL |
| 413238 | 2003 SM_{176} | — | September 18, 2003 | Palomar | NEAT | · | 2.7 km | MPC · JPL |
| 413239 | 2003 SA_{200} | — | September 21, 2003 | Anderson Mesa | LONEOS | · | 2.6 km | MPC · JPL |
| 413240 | 2003 SE_{204} | — | September 22, 2003 | Kitt Peak | Spacewatch | · | 2.1 km | MPC · JPL |
| 413241 | 2003 SD_{210} | — | September 26, 2003 | Socorro | LINEAR | AEG | 2.4 km | MPC · JPL |
| 413242 | 2003 SU_{213} | — | September 26, 2003 | Desert Eagle | W. K. Y. Yeung | · | 1.0 km | MPC · JPL |
| 413243 | 2003 SC_{215} | — | September 26, 2003 | Prescott | P. G. Comba | · | 2.1 km | MPC · JPL |
| 413244 | 2003 SE_{218} | — | September 27, 2003 | Kitt Peak | Spacewatch | · | 2.5 km | MPC · JPL |
| 413245 | 2003 SA_{219} | — | September 19, 2003 | Palomar | NEAT | · | 4.8 km | MPC · JPL |
| 413246 | 2003 SO_{268} | — | September 29, 2003 | Kitt Peak | Spacewatch | V | 580 m | MPC · JPL |
| 413247 | 2003 SY_{273} | — | September 28, 2003 | Socorro | LINEAR | NYS | 920 m | MPC · JPL |
| 413248 | 2003 SX_{299} | — | September 16, 2003 | Kitt Peak | Spacewatch | · | 2.8 km | MPC · JPL |
| 413249 | 2003 SS_{311} | — | September 29, 2003 | Socorro | LINEAR | · | 820 m | MPC · JPL |
| 413250 | 2003 SW_{318} | — | September 19, 2003 | Kitt Peak | Spacewatch | · | 2.2 km | MPC · JPL |
| 413251 | 2003 SJ_{319} | — | September 21, 2003 | Kitt Peak | Spacewatch | NYS | 840 m | MPC · JPL |
| 413252 | 2003 SM_{322} | — | September 29, 2003 | Anderson Mesa | LONEOS | · | 5.5 km | MPC · JPL |
| 413253 | 2003 SU_{325} | — | September 18, 2003 | Kitt Peak | Spacewatch | · | 1.0 km | MPC · JPL |
| 413254 | 2003 SM_{328} | — | September 21, 2003 | Anderson Mesa | LONEOS | · | 2.6 km | MPC · JPL |
| 413255 | 2003 SJ_{393} | — | September 18, 2003 | Campo Imperatore | CINEOS | · | 1.3 km | MPC · JPL |
| 413256 | 2003 SL_{400} | — | September 26, 2003 | Apache Point | SDSS | · | 2.8 km | MPC · JPL |
| 413257 | 2003 SH_{428} | — | September 17, 2003 | Kitt Peak | Spacewatch | · | 3.7 km | MPC · JPL |
| 413258 | 2003 SR_{431} | — | September 16, 2003 | Kitt Peak | Spacewatch | · | 1.7 km | MPC · JPL |
| 413259 | 2003 SO_{433} | — | September 30, 2003 | Kitt Peak | Spacewatch | EMA | 2.8 km | MPC · JPL |
| 413260 | 2003 TL_{4} | — | October 13, 2003 | Socorro | LINEAR | ATE · PHA | 430 m | MPC · JPL |
| 413261 | 2003 TJ_{17} | — | October 15, 2003 | Anderson Mesa | LONEOS | · | 3.7 km | MPC · JPL |
| 413262 | 2003 TS_{21} | — | October 1, 2003 | Anderson Mesa | LONEOS | MAS | 680 m | MPC · JPL |
| 413263 | 2003 TM_{24} | — | September 22, 2003 | Anderson Mesa | LONEOS | · | 2.8 km | MPC · JPL |
| 413264 | 2003 TY_{34} | — | October 1, 2003 | Kitt Peak | Spacewatch | · | 4.1 km | MPC · JPL |
| 413265 | 2003 TK_{36} | — | October 1, 2003 | Kitt Peak | Spacewatch | EOS | 1.7 km | MPC · JPL |
| 413266 | 2003 TS_{41} | — | October 2, 2003 | Kitt Peak | Spacewatch | · | 3.0 km | MPC · JPL |
| 413267 | 2003 TA_{45} | — | October 3, 2003 | Kitt Peak | Spacewatch | · | 3.0 km | MPC · JPL |
| 413268 | 2003 TY_{47} | — | September 19, 2003 | Kitt Peak | Spacewatch | EOS | 1.8 km | MPC · JPL |
| 413269 | 2003 TF_{54} | — | October 5, 2003 | Kitt Peak | Spacewatch | EOS | 1.7 km | MPC · JPL |
| 413270 | 2003 UR_{3} | — | October 16, 2003 | Kitt Peak | Spacewatch | · | 1.1 km | MPC · JPL |
| 413271 | 2003 UK_{15} | — | October 16, 2003 | Kitt Peak | Spacewatch | · | 3.6 km | MPC · JPL |
| 413272 | 2003 UY_{18} | — | October 20, 2003 | Socorro | LINEAR | PHO | 850 m | MPC · JPL |
| 413273 | 2003 UM_{36} | — | October 16, 2003 | Palomar | NEAT | · | 2.7 km | MPC · JPL |
| 413274 | 2003 UY_{47} | — | October 16, 2003 | Kitt Peak | Spacewatch | · | 2.5 km | MPC · JPL |
| 413275 | 2003 UU_{57} | — | October 16, 2003 | Kitt Peak | Spacewatch | EOS | 2.3 km | MPC · JPL |
| 413276 | 2003 UV_{57} | — | October 2, 2003 | Kitt Peak | Spacewatch | · | 3.2 km | MPC · JPL |
| 413277 | 2003 UP_{58} | — | October 16, 2003 | Kitt Peak | Spacewatch | · | 3.2 km | MPC · JPL |
| 413278 | 2003 UM_{65} | — | October 16, 2003 | Palomar | NEAT | · | 3.9 km | MPC · JPL |
| 413279 | 2003 UG_{70} | — | October 18, 2003 | Kitt Peak | Spacewatch | · | 880 m | MPC · JPL |
| 413280 | 2003 UX_{78} | — | October 18, 2003 | Kitt Peak | Spacewatch | · | 5.4 km | MPC · JPL |
| 413281 | 2003 UL_{80} | — | September 28, 2003 | Kitt Peak | Spacewatch | · | 880 m | MPC · JPL |
| 413282 | 2003 UO_{89} | — | October 20, 2003 | Kitt Peak | Spacewatch | · | 770 m | MPC · JPL |
| 413283 | 2003 UX_{108} | — | October 19, 2003 | Kitt Peak | Spacewatch | · | 3.8 km | MPC · JPL |
| 413284 | 2003 UG_{110} | — | October 19, 2003 | Kitt Peak | Spacewatch | LIX | 4.0 km | MPC · JPL |
| 413285 | 2003 UB_{113} | — | October 15, 2003 | Anderson Mesa | LONEOS | · | 1.3 km | MPC · JPL |
| 413286 | 2003 UN_{115} | — | October 2, 2003 | Kitt Peak | Spacewatch | · | 1.4 km | MPC · JPL |
| 413287 | 2003 UE_{128} | — | October 21, 2003 | Kitt Peak | Spacewatch | · | 1.3 km | MPC · JPL |
| 413288 | 2003 UL_{132} | — | October 19, 2003 | Palomar | NEAT | · | 4.9 km | MPC · JPL |
| 413289 | 2003 US_{155} | — | October 20, 2003 | Kitt Peak | Spacewatch | · | 1.1 km | MPC · JPL |
| 413290 | 2003 UX_{161} | — | October 21, 2003 | Socorro | LINEAR | · | 2.4 km | MPC · JPL |
| 413291 | 2003 UO_{164} | — | September 28, 2003 | Socorro | LINEAR | EOS | 3.1 km | MPC · JPL |
| 413292 | 2003 UT_{170} | — | October 19, 2003 | Kitt Peak | Spacewatch | TIR | 2.6 km | MPC · JPL |
| 413293 | 2003 UR_{176} | — | October 21, 2003 | Anderson Mesa | LONEOS | MAS | 860 m | MPC · JPL |
| 413294 | 2003 UJ_{177} | — | October 21, 2003 | Palomar | NEAT | H | 590 m | MPC · JPL |
| 413295 | 2003 UN_{178} | — | October 21, 2003 | Palomar | NEAT | · | 2.1 km | MPC · JPL |
| 413296 | 2003 UZ_{178} | — | October 21, 2003 | Palomar | NEAT | H | 590 m | MPC · JPL |
| 413297 | 2003 UL_{184} | — | October 3, 2003 | Kitt Peak | Spacewatch | · | 3.1 km | MPC · JPL |
| 413298 | 2003 UE_{195} | — | October 20, 2003 | Kitt Peak | Spacewatch | · | 1.0 km | MPC · JPL |
| 413299 | 2003 UV_{205} | — | October 22, 2003 | Socorro | LINEAR | · | 4.1 km | MPC · JPL |
| 413300 | 2003 UV_{206} | — | October 22, 2003 | Socorro | LINEAR | · | 1.3 km | MPC · JPL |

== 413301–413400 ==
back to top

| Designation | | | Discovery | | | Properties | | Ref |
| Permanent | Provisional | Named after | Date | Site | Discoverer(s) | Category | Diam. | Ref |
|---|---|---|---|---|---|---|---|---|
| 413301 | 2003 UJ_{219} | — | October 21, 2003 | Kitt Peak | Spacewatch | · | 3.5 km | MPC · JPL |
| 413302 | 2003 UW_{222} | — | October 22, 2003 | Socorro | LINEAR | · | 5.8 km | MPC · JPL |
| 413303 | 2003 UC_{223} | — | October 6, 2003 | Socorro | LINEAR | · | 1.2 km | MPC · JPL |
| 413304 | 2003 UR_{229} | — | October 3, 2003 | Kitt Peak | Spacewatch | · | 3.2 km | MPC · JPL |
| 413305 | 2003 UE_{230} | — | October 23, 2003 | Kitt Peak | Spacewatch | NYS | 1.0 km | MPC · JPL |
| 413306 | 2003 UQ_{233} | — | October 24, 2003 | Socorro | LINEAR | · | 4.9 km | MPC · JPL |
| 413307 | 2003 UF_{249} | — | October 25, 2003 | Socorro | LINEAR | · | 910 m | MPC · JPL |
| 413308 | 2003 UA_{264} | — | September 28, 2003 | Kitt Peak | Spacewatch | TIR | 2.9 km | MPC · JPL |
| 413309 | 2003 UG_{276} | — | October 29, 2003 | Catalina | CSS | · | 3.1 km | MPC · JPL |
| 413310 | 2003 UL_{291} | — | October 19, 2003 | Kitt Peak | Spacewatch | MAS | 800 m | MPC · JPL |
| 413311 | 2003 UM_{299} | — | October 16, 2003 | Kitt Peak | Spacewatch | MAS | 570 m | MPC · JPL |
| 413312 | 2003 UU_{300} | — | September 30, 2003 | Kitt Peak | Spacewatch | · | 2.7 km | MPC · JPL |
| 413313 | 2003 UX_{307} | — | October 18, 2003 | Kitt Peak | Spacewatch | EOS | 2.2 km | MPC · JPL |
| 413314 | 2003 UF_{317} | — | October 18, 2003 | Apache Point | SDSS | PHO | 2.4 km | MPC · JPL |
| 413315 | 2003 UL_{350} | — | October 19, 2003 | Apache Point | SDSS | · | 2.6 km | MPC · JPL |
| 413316 | 2003 UV_{375} | — | October 22, 2003 | Apache Point | SDSS | V | 630 m | MPC · JPL |
| 413317 | 2003 UB_{376} | — | October 22, 2003 | Apache Point | SDSS | · | 3.3 km | MPC · JPL |
| 413318 | 2003 UB_{378} | — | October 22, 2003 | Apache Point | SDSS | · | 2.0 km | MPC · JPL |
| 413319 | 2003 UE_{380} | — | October 22, 2003 | Apache Point | SDSS | · | 2.1 km | MPC · JPL |
| 413320 | 2003 UJ_{389} | — | October 22, 2003 | Kitt Peak | M. W. Buie | · | 2.6 km | MPC · JPL |
| 413321 | 2003 WK_{2} | — | October 20, 2003 | Kitt Peak | Spacewatch | · | 1.2 km | MPC · JPL |
| 413322 | 2003 WD_{4} | — | October 24, 2003 | Socorro | LINEAR | · | 1.3 km | MPC · JPL |
| 413323 | 2003 WL_{15} | — | November 16, 2003 | Kitt Peak | Spacewatch | · | 1.5 km | MPC · JPL |
| 413324 | 2003 WZ_{28} | — | November 18, 2003 | Kitt Peak | Spacewatch | · | 3.8 km | MPC · JPL |
| 413325 | 2003 WL_{55} | — | November 20, 2003 | Socorro | LINEAR | · | 1.8 km | MPC · JPL |
| 413326 | 2003 WB_{62} | — | November 19, 2003 | Kitt Peak | Spacewatch | NYS | 1.0 km | MPC · JPL |
| 413327 | 2003 WK_{67} | — | November 19, 2003 | Kitt Peak | Spacewatch | EUP | 4.6 km | MPC · JPL |
| 413328 | 2003 WV_{86} | — | November 21, 2003 | Socorro | LINEAR | · | 5.2 km | MPC · JPL |
| 413329 | 2003 WT_{96} | — | November 19, 2003 | Anderson Mesa | LONEOS | · | 3.2 km | MPC · JPL |
| 413330 | 2003 WN_{108} | — | November 20, 2003 | Kitt Peak | Spacewatch | · | 4.5 km | MPC · JPL |
| 413331 | 2003 WA_{113} | — | November 20, 2003 | Socorro | LINEAR | · | 1.9 km | MPC · JPL |
| 413332 | 2003 WD_{113} | — | November 20, 2003 | Socorro | LINEAR | · | 2.8 km | MPC · JPL |
| 413333 | 2003 WN_{113} | — | November 20, 2003 | Socorro | LINEAR | · | 1.3 km | MPC · JPL |
| 413334 | 2003 WV_{124} | — | November 20, 2003 | Socorro | LINEAR | · | 5.3 km | MPC · JPL |
| 413335 | 2003 WJ_{134} | — | November 21, 2003 | Socorro | LINEAR | · | 3.7 km | MPC · JPL |
| 413336 | 2003 WR_{137} | — | November 21, 2003 | Socorro | LINEAR | · | 2.0 km | MPC · JPL |
| 413337 | 2003 WG_{149} | — | November 24, 2003 | Socorro | LINEAR | · | 3.0 km | MPC · JPL |
| 413338 | 2003 WQ_{158} | — | November 28, 2003 | Kitt Peak | Spacewatch | NYS | 1.3 km | MPC · JPL |
| 413339 | 2003 WY_{160} | — | November 30, 2003 | Kitt Peak | Spacewatch | · | 970 m | MPC · JPL |
| 413340 | 2003 WB_{162} | — | November 30, 2003 | Kitt Peak | Spacewatch | · | 5.3 km | MPC · JPL |
| 413341 | 2003 WM_{180} | — | November 20, 2003 | Kitt Peak | M. W. Buie | · | 3.1 km | MPC · JPL |
| 413342 | 2003 WM_{183} | — | November 23, 2003 | Kitt Peak | M. W. Buie | NYS | 1.1 km | MPC · JPL |
| 413343 | 2003 XA | — | December 3, 2003 | Anderson Mesa | LONEOS | · | 1.8 km | MPC · JPL |
| 413344 | 2003 XM_{1} | — | December 1, 2003 | Kitt Peak | Spacewatch | · | 4.1 km | MPC · JPL |
| 413345 | 2003 XN_{8} | — | December 4, 2003 | Socorro | LINEAR | TIR | 3.9 km | MPC · JPL |
| 413346 | 2003 XB_{21} | — | December 14, 2003 | Kitt Peak | Spacewatch | · | 3.9 km | MPC · JPL |
| 413347 | 2003 XU_{23} | — | November 19, 2003 | Kitt Peak | Spacewatch | THM | 2.6 km | MPC · JPL |
| 413348 | 2003 XZ_{35} | — | December 3, 2003 | Socorro | LINEAR | · | 4.1 km | MPC · JPL |
| 413349 | 2003 YJ_{10} | — | December 17, 2003 | Socorro | LINEAR | · | 3.4 km | MPC · JPL |
| 413350 | 2003 YZ_{20} | — | December 17, 2003 | Kitt Peak | Spacewatch | H | 690 m | MPC · JPL |
| 413351 | 2003 YW_{45} | — | December 17, 2003 | Socorro | LINEAR | · | 2.2 km | MPC · JPL |
| 413352 | 2003 YQ_{47} | — | December 18, 2003 | Socorro | LINEAR | EUP | 4.3 km | MPC · JPL |
| 413353 | 2003 YE_{52} | — | December 18, 2003 | Socorro | LINEAR | · | 1.2 km | MPC · JPL |
| 413354 | 2003 YP_{54} | — | December 19, 2003 | Socorro | LINEAR | · | 1.3 km | MPC · JPL |
| 413355 | 2003 YD_{67} | — | November 19, 2003 | Kitt Peak | Spacewatch | MAS | 500 m | MPC · JPL |
| 413356 | 2003 YY_{67} | — | December 19, 2003 | Kitt Peak | Spacewatch | MAS | 680 m | MPC · JPL |
| 413357 | 2003 YY_{77} | — | December 18, 2003 | Socorro | LINEAR | · | 1.5 km | MPC · JPL |
| 413358 | 2003 YP_{103} | — | December 21, 2003 | Socorro | LINEAR | · | 2.7 km | MPC · JPL |
| 413359 | 2003 YB_{126} | — | December 27, 2003 | Socorro | LINEAR | · | 4.9 km | MPC · JPL |
| 413360 | 2003 YN_{148} | — | December 29, 2003 | Socorro | LINEAR | THB | 3.4 km | MPC · JPL |
| 413361 | 2004 BG | — | January 16, 2004 | Palomar | NEAT | · | 3.9 km | MPC · JPL |
| 413362 | 2004 BX_{20} | — | January 16, 2004 | Kitt Peak | Spacewatch | · | 1.1 km | MPC · JPL |
| 413363 | 2004 BK_{26} | — | January 16, 2004 | Kitt Peak | Spacewatch | EOS | 2.6 km | MPC · JPL |
| 413364 | 2004 BB_{35} | — | January 19, 2004 | Kitt Peak | Spacewatch | MAS | 570 m | MPC · JPL |
| 413365 | 2004 BM_{69} | — | January 27, 2004 | Goodricke-Pigott | R. A. Tucker | · | 2.7 km | MPC · JPL |
| 413366 | 2004 BL_{94} | — | January 28, 2004 | Socorro | LINEAR | · | 2.9 km | MPC · JPL |
| 413367 | 2004 BG_{140} | — | December 18, 2003 | Kitt Peak | Spacewatch | · | 960 m | MPC · JPL |
| 413368 | 2004 CD_{128} | — | February 13, 2004 | Kitt Peak | Spacewatch | · | 2.4 km | MPC · JPL |
| 413369 | 2004 FV_{135} | — | March 27, 2004 | Socorro | LINEAR | EUN | 1.1 km | MPC · JPL |
| 413370 | 2004 GZ_{9} | — | April 13, 2004 | Mount Graham | Ryan, W. H., Jamieson, Q. | · | 1.8 km | MPC · JPL |
| 413371 | 2004 GN_{39} | — | April 15, 2004 | Siding Spring | SSS | EUN | 1.7 km | MPC · JPL |
| 413372 | 2004 GQ_{39} | — | April 15, 2004 | Siding Spring | SSS | · | 1.8 km | MPC · JPL |
| 413373 | 2004 GQ_{52} | — | April 13, 2004 | Kitt Peak | Spacewatch | · | 1.2 km | MPC · JPL |
| 413374 | 2004 GH_{78} | — | April 9, 2004 | Siding Spring | SSS | RAF | 960 m | MPC · JPL |
| 413375 | 2004 HA_{3} | — | April 16, 2004 | Socorro | LINEAR | · | 1.8 km | MPC · JPL |
| 413376 | 2004 HT_{10} | — | April 17, 2004 | Socorro | LINEAR | · | 1.9 km | MPC · JPL |
| 413377 | 2004 HE_{22} | — | March 23, 2004 | Kitt Peak | Spacewatch | EUN | 1.0 km | MPC · JPL |
| 413378 | 2004 HY_{45} | — | April 21, 2004 | Socorro | LINEAR | · | 3.8 km | MPC · JPL |
| 413379 | 2004 HD_{67} | — | April 21, 2004 | Socorro | LINEAR | · | 1.7 km | MPC · JPL |
| 413380 | 2004 JB_{3} | — | May 9, 2004 | Palomar | NEAT | · | 2.0 km | MPC · JPL |
| 413381 | 2004 JD_{36} | — | May 15, 2004 | Socorro | LINEAR | JUN | 1.1 km | MPC · JPL |
| 413382 | 2004 JR_{45} | — | May 15, 2004 | Socorro | LINEAR | · | 2.3 km | MPC · JPL |
| 413383 | 2004 NS_{27} | — | July 11, 2004 | Socorro | LINEAR | · | 1.5 km | MPC · JPL |
| 413384 | 2004 PN_{41} | — | August 7, 2004 | Palomar | NEAT | · | 600 m | MPC · JPL |
| 413385 | 2004 PM_{65} | — | August 10, 2004 | Socorro | LINEAR | · | 2.6 km | MPC · JPL |
| 413386 | 2004 PL_{111} | — | August 15, 2004 | Cerro Tololo | M. W. Buie | · | 580 m | MPC · JPL |
| 413387 | 2004 QS_{18} | — | August 21, 2004 | Catalina | CSS | · | 1.3 km | MPC · JPL |
| 413388 | 2004 RX_{49} | — | September 8, 2004 | Socorro | LINEAR | · | 780 m | MPC · JPL |
| 413389 | 2004 RH_{83} | — | September 9, 2004 | Socorro | LINEAR | · | 2.3 km | MPC · JPL |
| 413390 | 2004 RG_{96} | — | September 8, 2004 | Socorro | LINEAR | · | 610 m | MPC · JPL |
| 413391 | 2004 RZ_{152} | — | September 10, 2004 | Socorro | LINEAR | · | 720 m | MPC · JPL |
| 413392 | 2004 RA_{156} | — | September 10, 2004 | Socorro | LINEAR | · | 2.0 km | MPC · JPL |
| 413393 | 2004 RB_{164} | — | September 10, 2004 | Kitt Peak | Spacewatch | · | 610 m | MPC · JPL |
| 413394 | 2004 RX_{173} | — | August 21, 2004 | Catalina | CSS | · | 810 m | MPC · JPL |
| 413395 | 2004 RV_{206} | — | September 11, 2004 | Socorro | LINEAR | · | 2.2 km | MPC · JPL |
| 413396 | 2004 RS_{256} | — | September 9, 2004 | Socorro | LINEAR | · | 740 m | MPC · JPL |
| 413397 | 2004 RC_{258} | — | September 10, 2004 | Socorro | LINEAR | · | 590 m | MPC · JPL |
| 413398 | 2004 RA_{318} | — | September 12, 2004 | Kitt Peak | Spacewatch | · | 750 m | MPC · JPL |
| 413399 | 2004 RB_{325} | — | September 13, 2004 | Socorro | LINEAR | · | 2.2 km | MPC · JPL |
| 413400 | 2004 RV_{343} | — | September 13, 2004 | Palomar | NEAT | · | 680 m | MPC · JPL |

== 413401–413500 ==
back to top

| Designation | | | Discovery | | | Properties | | Ref |
| Permanent | Provisional | Named after | Date | Site | Discoverer(s) | Category | Diam. | Ref |
|---|---|---|---|---|---|---|---|---|
| 413401 | 2004 RW_{346} | — | September 13, 2004 | Socorro | LINEAR | · | 660 m | MPC · JPL |
| 413402 | 2004 SM_{3} | — | September 17, 2004 | Socorro | LINEAR | · | 760 m | MPC · JPL |
| 413403 | 2004 TT_{2} | — | October 4, 2004 | Kitt Peak | Spacewatch | · | 590 m | MPC · JPL |
| 413404 | 2004 TZ_{32} | — | October 4, 2004 | Kitt Peak | Spacewatch | NAE | 2.4 km | MPC · JPL |
| 413405 | 2004 TC_{53} | — | October 4, 2004 | Kitt Peak | Spacewatch | · | 700 m | MPC · JPL |
| 413406 | 2004 TU_{81} | — | October 5, 2004 | Kitt Peak | Spacewatch | · | 720 m | MPC · JPL |
| 413407 | 2004 TK_{94} | — | September 7, 2004 | Kitt Peak | Spacewatch | · | 720 m | MPC · JPL |
| 413408 | 2004 TP_{139} | — | October 9, 2004 | Anderson Mesa | LONEOS | · | 3.7 km | MPC · JPL |
| 413409 | 2004 TX_{149} | — | October 6, 2004 | Kitt Peak | Spacewatch | KOR | 1.2 km | MPC · JPL |
| 413410 | 2004 TR_{152} | — | October 6, 2004 | Kitt Peak | Spacewatch | KOR | 1.2 km | MPC · JPL |
| 413411 | 2004 TR_{175} | — | October 9, 2004 | Socorro | LINEAR | · | 760 m | MPC · JPL |
| 413412 | 2004 TG_{177} | — | October 4, 2004 | Kitt Peak | Spacewatch | · | 470 m | MPC · JPL |
| 413413 | 2004 TW_{187} | — | September 10, 2004 | Kitt Peak | Spacewatch | EOS | 1.7 km | MPC · JPL |
| 413414 | 2004 TT_{192} | — | October 7, 2004 | Kitt Peak | Spacewatch | · | 720 m | MPC · JPL |
| 413415 | 2004 TD_{212} | — | October 8, 2004 | Kitt Peak | Spacewatch | · | 2.1 km | MPC · JPL |
| 413416 | 2004 TL_{219} | — | October 5, 2004 | Kitt Peak | Spacewatch | · | 600 m | MPC · JPL |
| 413417 | 2004 TH_{235} | — | October 8, 2004 | Socorro | LINEAR | H | 570 m | MPC · JPL |
| 413418 | 2004 TA_{244} | — | October 6, 2004 | Kitt Peak | Spacewatch | · | 2.1 km | MPC · JPL |
| 413419 | 2004 TB_{253} | — | October 9, 2004 | Kitt Peak | Spacewatch | · | 2.8 km | MPC · JPL |
| 413420 | 2004 TC_{342} | — | October 9, 2004 | Kitt Peak | Spacewatch | · | 690 m | MPC · JPL |
| 413421 | 2004 VA_{15} | — | November 5, 2004 | Anderson Mesa | LONEOS | T_{j} (2.95) · AMO +1km | 1.9 km | MPC · JPL |
| 413422 | 2004 VF_{40} | — | November 4, 2004 | Kitt Peak | Spacewatch | · | 690 m | MPC · JPL |
| 413423 | 2004 VW_{45} | — | November 4, 2004 | Kitt Peak | Spacewatch | · | 2.5 km | MPC · JPL |
| 413424 | 2004 WL | — | November 4, 2004 | Catalina | CSS | · | 800 m | MPC · JPL |
| 413425 | 2004 XC_{20} | — | December 8, 2004 | Socorro | LINEAR | · | 2.8 km | MPC · JPL |
| 413426 | 2004 XT_{49} | — | November 4, 2004 | Kitt Peak | Spacewatch | · | 860 m | MPC · JPL |
| 413427 | 2004 XB_{81} | — | December 10, 2004 | Socorro | LINEAR | · | 3.8 km | MPC · JPL |
| 413428 | 2004 XH_{146} | — | December 14, 2004 | Socorro | LINEAR | · | 2.6 km | MPC · JPL |
| 413429 | 2004 XN_{147} | — | December 12, 2004 | Socorro | LINEAR | · | 770 m | MPC · JPL |
| 413430 | 2004 XT_{160} | — | December 14, 2004 | Kitt Peak | Spacewatch | · | 1.9 km | MPC · JPL |
| 413431 | 2004 YB_{19} | — | December 18, 2004 | Mount Lemmon | Mount Lemmon Survey | HYG | 2.6 km | MPC · JPL |
| 413432 | 2004 YL_{19} | — | December 18, 2004 | Mount Lemmon | Mount Lemmon Survey | · | 2.8 km | MPC · JPL |
| 413433 | 2004 YB_{22} | — | December 18, 2004 | Mount Lemmon | Mount Lemmon Survey | · | 4.3 km | MPC · JPL |
| 413434 | 2005 AB_{14} | — | January 7, 2005 | Catalina | CSS | · | 4.0 km | MPC · JPL |
| 413435 | 2005 AW_{34} | — | January 13, 2005 | Socorro | LINEAR | · | 2.2 km | MPC · JPL |
| 413436 | 2005 AB_{68} | — | January 6, 2005 | Catalina | CSS | · | 3.1 km | MPC · JPL |
| 413437 | 2005 AP_{69} | — | January 15, 2005 | Kitt Peak | Spacewatch | NYS | 1.4 km | MPC · JPL |
| 413438 | 2005 BN | — | January 16, 2005 | Desert Eagle | W. K. Y. Yeung | · | 550 m | MPC · JPL |
| 413439 | 2005 BH_{7} | — | January 16, 2005 | Socorro | LINEAR | · | 780 m | MPC · JPL |
| 413440 | 2005 BG_{16} | — | December 15, 2004 | Kitt Peak | Spacewatch | · | 760 m | MPC · JPL |
| 413441 | 2005 BT_{24} | — | January 17, 2005 | Socorro | LINEAR | · | 1.0 km | MPC · JPL |
| 413442 | 2005 CJ_{22} | — | February 1, 2005 | Palomar | NEAT | THB | 3.5 km | MPC · JPL |
| 413443 | 2005 CX_{26} | — | February 1, 2005 | Kitt Peak | Spacewatch | LIX | 4.9 km | MPC · JPL |
| 413444 | 2005 CC_{32} | — | February 1, 2005 | Kitt Peak | Spacewatch | · | 3.1 km | MPC · JPL |
| 413445 | 2005 CK_{44} | — | February 2, 2005 | Kitt Peak | Spacewatch | V | 690 m | MPC · JPL |
| 413446 | 2005 CP_{44} | — | February 2, 2005 | Kitt Peak | Spacewatch | · | 3.2 km | MPC · JPL |
| 413447 | 2005 CA_{50} | — | January 19, 2005 | Kitt Peak | Spacewatch | V | 850 m | MPC · JPL |
| 413448 | 2005 CD_{55} | — | February 4, 2005 | Mount Lemmon | Mount Lemmon Survey | THM | 2.1 km | MPC · JPL |
| 413449 | 2005 CS_{64} | — | January 13, 2005 | Kitt Peak | Spacewatch | · | 770 m | MPC · JPL |
| 413450 | 2005 EO_{6} | — | March 1, 2005 | Kitt Peak | Spacewatch | · | 850 m | MPC · JPL |
| 413451 | 2005 EW_{27} | — | March 3, 2005 | Socorro | LINEAR | · | 3.1 km | MPC · JPL |
| 413452 | 2005 EE_{34} | — | March 3, 2005 | Catalina | CSS | PHO | 1.0 km | MPC · JPL |
| 413453 | 2005 EZ_{65} | — | March 4, 2005 | Mount Lemmon | Mount Lemmon Survey | · | 1.6 km | MPC · JPL |
| 413454 | 2005 EF_{117} | — | March 4, 2005 | Mount Lemmon | Mount Lemmon Survey | · | 2.7 km | MPC · JPL |
| 413455 | 2005 EY_{146} | — | March 10, 2005 | Mount Lemmon | Mount Lemmon Survey | · | 1.4 km | MPC · JPL |
| 413456 | 2005 ER_{151} | — | March 10, 2005 | Kitt Peak | Spacewatch | H | 530 m | MPC · JPL |
| 413457 | 2005 EN_{153} | — | March 8, 2005 | Catalina | CSS | H | 730 m | MPC · JPL |
| 413458 | 2005 EN_{161} | — | March 9, 2005 | Mount Lemmon | Mount Lemmon Survey | · | 1.3 km | MPC · JPL |
| 413459 | 2005 EH_{169} | — | March 11, 2005 | Catalina | CSS | · | 1.7 km | MPC · JPL |
| 413460 | 2005 EB_{190} | — | March 11, 2005 | Mount Lemmon | Mount Lemmon Survey | · | 3.0 km | MPC · JPL |
| 413461 | 2005 EX_{201} | — | March 8, 2005 | Catalina | CSS | · | 4.7 km | MPC · JPL |
| 413462 | 2005 ER_{212} | — | March 4, 2005 | Socorro | LINEAR | T_{j} (2.98) | 4.4 km | MPC · JPL |
| 413463 | 2005 EX_{256} | — | December 29, 2000 | Kitt Peak | Spacewatch | NYS | 1.1 km | MPC · JPL |
| 413464 | 2005 EL_{260} | — | March 11, 2005 | Kitt Peak | Spacewatch | · | 950 m | MPC · JPL |
| 413465 | 2005 EH_{299} | — | February 9, 2005 | Kitt Peak | Spacewatch | THM | 2.3 km | MPC · JPL |
| 413466 | 2005 EA_{313} | — | March 10, 2005 | Kitt Peak | M. W. Buie | · | 3.6 km | MPC · JPL |
| 413467 | 2005 GL_{31} | — | April 4, 2005 | Catalina | CSS | · | 1.5 km | MPC · JPL |
| 413468 | 2005 GY_{41} | — | March 8, 2005 | Mount Lemmon | Mount Lemmon Survey | NYS | 920 m | MPC · JPL |
| 413469 | 2005 GN_{75} | — | April 5, 2005 | Mount Lemmon | Mount Lemmon Survey | H | 560 m | MPC · JPL |
| 413470 | 2005 GM_{110} | — | February 27, 2001 | Kitt Peak | Spacewatch | NYS | 1.2 km | MPC · JPL |
| 413471 | 2005 GZ_{115} | — | April 1, 2005 | Kitt Peak | Spacewatch | · | 980 m | MPC · JPL |
| 413472 | 2005 GZ_{117} | — | April 1, 2005 | Kitt Peak | Spacewatch | · | 1.2 km | MPC · JPL |
| 413473 | 2005 GZ_{125} | — | March 16, 2005 | Mount Lemmon | Mount Lemmon Survey | · | 980 m | MPC · JPL |
| 413474 | 2005 GW_{150} | — | April 11, 2005 | Kitt Peak | Spacewatch | V | 650 m | MPC · JPL |
| 413475 | 2005 GP_{161} | — | April 13, 2005 | Catalina | CSS | V | 840 m | MPC · JPL |
| 413476 | 2005 GS_{180} | — | April 12, 2005 | Kitt Peak | Spacewatch | MAS | 740 m | MPC · JPL |
| 413477 | 2005 GR_{182} | — | April 1, 2005 | Kitt Peak | Spacewatch | · | 1.3 km | MPC · JPL |
| 413478 | 2005 JL_{2} | — | May 3, 2005 | Kitt Peak | Spacewatch | · | 1.4 km | MPC · JPL |
| 413479 | 2005 JO_{22} | — | May 7, 2005 | Mount Lemmon | Mount Lemmon Survey | · | 1.9 km | MPC · JPL |
| 413480 | 2005 JO_{28} | — | May 3, 2005 | Kitt Peak | Spacewatch | PHO | 1.1 km | MPC · JPL |
| 413481 | 2005 JH_{84} | — | March 18, 2005 | Catalina | CSS | H | 540 m | MPC · JPL |
| 413482 | 2005 JU_{145} | — | May 12, 2005 | Catalina | CSS | · | 1.2 km | MPC · JPL |
| 413483 | 2005 JB_{152} | — | May 4, 2005 | Mount Lemmon | Mount Lemmon Survey | NYS | 1.1 km | MPC · JPL |
| 413484 | 2005 LQ_{28} | — | June 9, 2005 | Kitt Peak | Spacewatch | · | 1.6 km | MPC · JPL |
| 413485 | 2005 ME_{30} | — | June 29, 2005 | Kitt Peak | Spacewatch | T_{j} (2.98) · 3:2 | 4.0 km | MPC · JPL |
| 413486 | 2005 MW_{38} | — | June 30, 2005 | Kitt Peak | Spacewatch | · | 1.5 km | MPC · JPL |
| 413487 | 2005 NG_{5} | — | July 3, 2005 | Mount Lemmon | Mount Lemmon Survey | · | 1.2 km | MPC · JPL |
| 413488 | 2005 NU_{35} | — | June 13, 2005 | Kitt Peak | Spacewatch | · | 1.5 km | MPC · JPL |
| 413489 | 2005 NO_{40} | — | July 3, 2005 | Mount Lemmon | Mount Lemmon Survey | · | 1.2 km | MPC · JPL |
| 413490 | 2005 NR_{67} | — | July 3, 2005 | Mount Lemmon | Mount Lemmon Survey | 3:2 | 4.8 km | MPC · JPL |
| 413491 | 2005 NK_{70} | — | July 4, 2005 | Palomar | NEAT | EUN | 1.1 km | MPC · JPL |
| 413492 | 2005 OZ_{17} | — | July 30, 2005 | Palomar | NEAT | · | 2.2 km | MPC · JPL |
| 413493 | 2005 OA_{22} | — | July 29, 2005 | Palomar | NEAT | · | 1.7 km | MPC · JPL |
| 413494 | 2005 PU_{11} | — | August 4, 2005 | Palomar | NEAT | · | 1.5 km | MPC · JPL |
| 413495 | 2005 QZ_{3} | — | August 24, 2005 | Palomar | NEAT | · | 1.9 km | MPC · JPL |
| 413496 | 2005 QQ_{5} | — | August 6, 2005 | Socorro | LINEAR | JUN | 1.1 km | MPC · JPL |
| 413497 | 2005 QZ_{5} | — | August 24, 2005 | Palomar | NEAT | · | 1.7 km | MPC · JPL |
| 413498 | 2005 QZ_{15} | — | August 25, 2005 | Palomar | NEAT | · | 1.3 km | MPC · JPL |
| 413499 | 2005 QR_{35} | — | August 25, 2005 | Palomar | NEAT | · | 1.6 km | MPC · JPL |
| 413500 | 2005 QS_{38} | — | August 25, 2005 | Campo Imperatore | CINEOS | · | 1.4 km | MPC · JPL |

== 413501–413600 ==
back to top

| Designation | | | Discovery | | | Properties | | Ref |
| Permanent | Provisional | Named after | Date | Site | Discoverer(s) | Category | Diam. | Ref |
|---|---|---|---|---|---|---|---|---|
| 413501 | 2005 QU_{64} | — | August 26, 2005 | Palomar | NEAT | · | 2.0 km | MPC · JPL |
| 413502 | 2005 QY_{72} | — | August 29, 2005 | Kitt Peak | Spacewatch | EUN | 1.6 km | MPC · JPL |
| 413503 | 2005 QM_{84} | — | August 30, 2005 | Campo Imperatore | CINEOS | · | 1.8 km | MPC · JPL |
| 413504 | 2005 QC_{126} | — | August 28, 2005 | Kitt Peak | Spacewatch | · | 1.3 km | MPC · JPL |
| 413505 | 2005 QB_{128} | — | August 28, 2005 | Kitt Peak | Spacewatch | · | 1.5 km | MPC · JPL |
| 413506 | 2005 QB_{129} | — | August 28, 2005 | Kitt Peak | Spacewatch | WIT | 920 m | MPC · JPL |
| 413507 | 2005 QD_{130} | — | August 28, 2005 | Kitt Peak | Spacewatch | · | 1.7 km | MPC · JPL |
| 413508 | 2005 QF_{132} | — | August 28, 2005 | Kitt Peak | Spacewatch | · | 1.8 km | MPC · JPL |
| 413509 | 2005 QB_{175} | — | August 31, 2005 | Kitt Peak | Spacewatch | · | 1.3 km | MPC · JPL |
| 413510 | 2005 RP_{9} | — | August 29, 2005 | Kitt Peak | Spacewatch | · | 2.5 km | MPC · JPL |
| 413511 | 2005 RS_{24} | — | September 11, 2005 | Socorro | LINEAR | · | 2.2 km | MPC · JPL |
| 413512 | 2005 RT_{44} | — | September 2, 2005 | Palomar | NEAT | · | 4.4 km | MPC · JPL |
| 413513 | 2005 RR_{47} | — | September 13, 2005 | Apache Point | A. C. Becker | · | 1.4 km | MPC · JPL |
| 413514 | 2005 RX_{47} | — | September 13, 2005 | Apache Point | A. C. Becker | · | 1.6 km | MPC · JPL |
| 413515 | 2005 SH_{6} | — | September 23, 2005 | Kitt Peak | Spacewatch | · | 2.1 km | MPC · JPL |
| 413516 | 2005 SS_{16} | — | September 26, 2005 | Kitt Peak | Spacewatch | (11882) · fast? | 1.4 km | MPC · JPL |
| 413517 | 2005 SU_{23} | — | September 13, 2005 | Catalina | CSS | · | 1.5 km | MPC · JPL |
| 413518 | 2005 SD_{28} | — | September 23, 2005 | Kitt Peak | Spacewatch | · | 1.7 km | MPC · JPL |
| 413519 | 2005 SA_{31} | — | September 9, 2005 | Socorro | LINEAR | · | 2.3 km | MPC · JPL |
| 413520 | 2005 SB_{32} | — | September 23, 2005 | Kitt Peak | Spacewatch | · | 1.8 km | MPC · JPL |
| 413521 | 2005 SY_{39} | — | September 24, 2005 | Kitt Peak | Spacewatch | MIS | 2.2 km | MPC · JPL |
| 413522 | 2005 SE_{40} | — | September 24, 2005 | Kitt Peak | Spacewatch | · | 1.3 km | MPC · JPL |
| 413523 | 2005 SX_{40} | — | September 24, 2005 | Kitt Peak | Spacewatch | · | 1.6 km | MPC · JPL |
| 413524 | 2005 SC_{44} | — | September 24, 2005 | Kitt Peak | Spacewatch | · | 1.8 km | MPC · JPL |
| 413525 | 2005 SK_{54} | — | September 25, 2005 | Kitt Peak | Spacewatch | WIT | 1 km | MPC · JPL |
| 413526 | 2005 SX_{58} | — | September 26, 2005 | Kitt Peak | Spacewatch | · | 1.5 km | MPC · JPL |
| 413527 | 2005 SW_{63} | — | September 26, 2005 | Kitt Peak | Spacewatch | · | 1.6 km | MPC · JPL |
| 413528 | 2005 SO_{76} | — | September 24, 2005 | Kitt Peak | Spacewatch | · | 1.8 km | MPC · JPL |
| 413529 | 2005 SX_{83} | — | September 24, 2005 | Kitt Peak | Spacewatch | · | 2.2 km | MPC · JPL |
| 413530 | 2005 SQ_{85} | — | September 24, 2005 | Kitt Peak | Spacewatch | · | 1.9 km | MPC · JPL |
| 413531 | 2005 SW_{88} | — | September 24, 2005 | Kitt Peak | Spacewatch | · | 1.9 km | MPC · JPL |
| 413532 | 2005 SS_{93} | — | September 24, 2005 | Kitt Peak | Spacewatch | · | 1.9 km | MPC · JPL |
| 413533 | 2005 SC_{100} | — | September 25, 2005 | Kitt Peak | Spacewatch | · | 1.7 km | MPC · JPL |
| 413534 | 2005 SC_{104} | — | September 25, 2005 | Kitt Peak | Spacewatch | · | 2.8 km | MPC · JPL |
| 413535 | 2005 SU_{109} | — | September 26, 2005 | Kitt Peak | Spacewatch | · | 1.6 km | MPC · JPL |
| 413536 | 2005 SQ_{121} | — | September 29, 2005 | Kitt Peak | Spacewatch | · | 2.0 km | MPC · JPL |
| 413537 | 2005 SU_{129} | — | September 29, 2005 | Mount Lemmon | Mount Lemmon Survey | AGN | 920 m | MPC · JPL |
| 413538 | 2005 SJ_{131} | — | September 29, 2005 | Kitt Peak | Spacewatch | · | 1.3 km | MPC · JPL |
| 413539 | 2005 SO_{131} | — | September 29, 2005 | Kitt Peak | Spacewatch | · | 1.3 km | MPC · JPL |
| 413540 | 2005 SO_{142} | — | September 25, 2005 | Kitt Peak | Spacewatch | · | 1.6 km | MPC · JPL |
| 413541 | 2005 SX_{146} | — | September 25, 2005 | Kitt Peak | Spacewatch | WIT | 850 m | MPC · JPL |
| 413542 | 2005 SM_{159} | — | September 23, 2005 | Catalina | CSS | · | 2.0 km | MPC · JPL |
| 413543 | 2005 SQ_{161} | — | September 27, 2005 | Kitt Peak | Spacewatch | · | 1.9 km | MPC · JPL |
| 413544 | 2005 SW_{174} | — | September 29, 2005 | Kitt Peak | Spacewatch | · | 1.5 km | MPC · JPL |
| 413545 | 2005 SL_{176} | — | September 29, 2005 | Kitt Peak | Spacewatch | · | 1.8 km | MPC · JPL |
| 413546 | 2005 SC_{178} | — | September 29, 2005 | Kitt Peak | Spacewatch | · | 1.8 km | MPC · JPL |
| 413547 | 2005 SS_{178} | — | September 29, 2005 | Anderson Mesa | LONEOS | EUN | 1.2 km | MPC · JPL |
| 413548 | 2005 SJ_{180} | — | September 1, 2005 | Kitt Peak | Spacewatch | · | 1.5 km | MPC · JPL |
| 413549 | 2005 SJ_{182} | — | September 29, 2005 | Kitt Peak | Spacewatch | · | 1.5 km | MPC · JPL |
| 413550 | 2005 SG_{189} | — | September 29, 2005 | Mount Lemmon | Mount Lemmon Survey | · | 1.9 km | MPC · JPL |
| 413551 | 2005 SZ_{208} | — | September 30, 2005 | Mount Lemmon | Mount Lemmon Survey | · | 1.6 km | MPC · JPL |
| 413552 | 2005 SV_{218} | — | September 30, 2005 | Mount Lemmon | Mount Lemmon Survey | (32418) | 2.1 km | MPC · JPL |
| 413553 | 2005 SR_{221} | — | September 30, 2005 | Catalina | CSS | · | 3.1 km | MPC · JPL |
| 413554 | 2005 SY_{232} | — | September 30, 2005 | Mount Lemmon | Mount Lemmon Survey | PAD | 1.6 km | MPC · JPL |
| 413555 | 2005 SO_{236} | — | September 29, 2005 | Kitt Peak | Spacewatch | WIT | 1.0 km | MPC · JPL |
| 413556 | 2005 SZ_{247} | — | September 30, 2005 | Kitt Peak | Spacewatch | · | 1.6 km | MPC · JPL |
| 413557 | 2005 SJ_{255} | — | September 22, 2005 | Palomar | NEAT | · | 1.5 km | MPC · JPL |
| 413558 | 2005 ST_{266} | — | September 29, 2005 | Anderson Mesa | LONEOS | · | 1.5 km | MPC · JPL |
| 413559 | 2005 SN_{271} | — | September 30, 2005 | Mount Lemmon | Mount Lemmon Survey | · | 2.2 km | MPC · JPL |
| 413560 | 2005 SD_{284} | — | September 24, 2005 | Apache Point | A. C. Becker | · | 1.3 km | MPC · JPL |
| 413561 | 2005 SB_{290} | — | September 27, 2005 | Kitt Peak | Spacewatch | · | 2.0 km | MPC · JPL |
| 413562 | 2005 TU_{36} | — | October 1, 2005 | Catalina | CSS | · | 2.1 km | MPC · JPL |
| 413563 | 2005 TG_{45} | — | October 5, 2005 | Catalina | CSS | IEO +1km · fast? | 1.1 km | MPC · JPL |
| 413564 | 2005 TW_{53} | — | October 1, 2005 | Mount Lemmon | Mount Lemmon Survey | · | 1.8 km | MPC · JPL |
| 413565 | 2005 TY_{55} | — | October 6, 2005 | Catalina | CSS | · | 2.0 km | MPC · JPL |
| 413566 | 2005 TH_{86} | — | October 4, 2005 | Mount Lemmon | Mount Lemmon Survey | · | 1.5 km | MPC · JPL |
| 413567 | 2005 TY_{91} | — | October 6, 2005 | Catalina | CSS | · | 2.8 km | MPC · JPL |
| 413568 | 2005 TC_{103} | — | October 7, 2005 | Anderson Mesa | LONEOS | · | 1.5 km | MPC · JPL |
| 413569 | 2005 TA_{119} | — | October 7, 2005 | Kitt Peak | Spacewatch | · | 1.6 km | MPC · JPL |
| 413570 | 2005 TD_{122} | — | October 7, 2005 | Kitt Peak | Spacewatch | · | 1.6 km | MPC · JPL |
| 413571 | 2005 TF_{126} | — | September 30, 2005 | Mount Lemmon | Mount Lemmon Survey | · | 1.6 km | MPC · JPL |
| 413572 | 2005 TO_{139} | — | September 29, 2005 | Kitt Peak | Spacewatch | · | 1.9 km | MPC · JPL |
| 413573 | 2005 TT_{157} | — | September 24, 2005 | Kitt Peak | Spacewatch | · | 2.2 km | MPC · JPL |
| 413574 | 2005 TX_{159} | — | October 9, 2005 | Kitt Peak | Spacewatch | · | 1.6 km | MPC · JPL |
| 413575 | 2005 TQ_{178} | — | September 26, 2005 | Catalina | CSS | EUN | 1.3 km | MPC · JPL |
| 413576 | 2005 UZ_{2} | — | October 25, 2005 | La Silla | Behrend, R., Vuissoz, C. | · | 2.0 km | MPC · JPL |
| 413577 | 2005 UL_{5} | — | October 27, 2005 | Socorro | LINEAR | ATE · PHA | 300 m | MPC · JPL |
| 413578 | 2005 UM_{6} | — | October 26, 2005 | Kitt Peak | Spacewatch | · | 470 m | MPC · JPL |
| 413579 | 2005 UB_{14} | — | October 2, 2005 | Mount Lemmon | Mount Lemmon Survey | · | 1.5 km | MPC · JPL |
| 413580 | 2005 UV_{21} | — | October 23, 2005 | Kitt Peak | Spacewatch | · | 2.2 km | MPC · JPL |
| 413581 | 2005 UX_{43} | — | September 30, 2005 | Kitt Peak | Spacewatch | · | 1.8 km | MPC · JPL |
| 413582 | 2005 UY_{44} | — | October 22, 2005 | Kitt Peak | Spacewatch | · | 1.8 km | MPC · JPL |
| 413583 | 2005 UN_{49} | — | October 23, 2005 | Catalina | CSS | · | 1.8 km | MPC · JPL |
| 413584 | 2005 UG_{60} | — | October 25, 2005 | Anderson Mesa | LONEOS | · | 2.9 km | MPC · JPL |
| 413585 | 2005 UT_{61} | — | October 25, 2005 | Mount Lemmon | Mount Lemmon Survey | · | 1.9 km | MPC · JPL |
| 413586 | 2005 UF_{70} | — | October 23, 2005 | Catalina | CSS | EUN | 1.8 km | MPC · JPL |
| 413587 | 2005 UO_{83} | — | October 22, 2005 | Kitt Peak | Spacewatch | AGN | 1.1 km | MPC · JPL |
| 413588 | 2005 UP_{83} | — | October 22, 2005 | Kitt Peak | Spacewatch | · | 1.7 km | MPC · JPL |
| 413589 | 2005 UE_{87} | — | October 22, 2005 | Kitt Peak | Spacewatch | · | 1.8 km | MPC · JPL |
| 413590 | 2005 UF_{98} | — | October 22, 2005 | Kitt Peak | Spacewatch | AGN | 1.4 km | MPC · JPL |
| 413591 | 2005 UX_{104} | — | October 22, 2005 | Kitt Peak | Spacewatch | · | 2.2 km | MPC · JPL |
| 413592 | 2005 UU_{108} | — | October 5, 2005 | Catalina | CSS | · | 1.7 km | MPC · JPL |
| 413593 | 2005 US_{109} | — | October 22, 2005 | Kitt Peak | Spacewatch | · | 2.6 km | MPC · JPL |
| 413594 | 2005 UO_{111} | — | October 22, 2005 | Kitt Peak | Spacewatch | · | 1.8 km | MPC · JPL |
| 413595 | 2005 UH_{113} | — | October 22, 2005 | Kitt Peak | Spacewatch | HOF | 2.4 km | MPC · JPL |
| 413596 | 2005 UK_{117} | — | October 24, 2005 | Kitt Peak | Spacewatch | · | 1.6 km | MPC · JPL |
| 413597 | 2005 UO_{117} | — | October 12, 2005 | Kitt Peak | Spacewatch | · | 2.1 km | MPC · JPL |
| 413598 | 2005 UY_{122} | — | October 24, 2005 | Kitt Peak | Spacewatch | EUN | 1.5 km | MPC · JPL |
| 413599 | 2005 UU_{167} | — | October 5, 2005 | Kitt Peak | Spacewatch | · | 2.8 km | MPC · JPL |
| 413600 | 2005 UU_{171} | — | October 24, 2005 | Kitt Peak | Spacewatch | · | 1.9 km | MPC · JPL |

== 413601–413700 ==
back to top

| Designation | | | Discovery | | | Properties | | Ref |
| Permanent | Provisional | Named after | Date | Site | Discoverer(s) | Category | Diam. | Ref |
|---|---|---|---|---|---|---|---|---|
| 413601 | 2005 UW_{171} | — | October 24, 2005 | Kitt Peak | Spacewatch | · | 2.2 km | MPC · JPL |
| 413602 | 2005 UZ_{171} | — | October 24, 2005 | Kitt Peak | Spacewatch | · | 1.7 km | MPC · JPL |
| 413603 | 2005 UU_{184} | — | October 25, 2005 | Mount Lemmon | Mount Lemmon Survey | WIT | 900 m | MPC · JPL |
| 413604 | 2005 UM_{195} | — | October 22, 2005 | Kitt Peak | Spacewatch | · | 1.6 km | MPC · JPL |
| 413605 | 2005 UB_{203} | — | October 25, 2005 | Kitt Peak | Spacewatch | HOF | 2.7 km | MPC · JPL |
| 413606 | 2005 UG_{204} | — | October 25, 2005 | Mount Lemmon | Mount Lemmon Survey | · | 1.8 km | MPC · JPL |
| 413607 | 2005 UK_{212} | — | October 27, 2005 | Kitt Peak | Spacewatch | · | 1.9 km | MPC · JPL |
| 413608 | 2005 UB_{222} | — | October 25, 2005 | Kitt Peak | Spacewatch | · | 1.8 km | MPC · JPL |
| 413609 | 2005 UP_{225} | — | October 25, 2005 | Kitt Peak | Spacewatch | AGN | 1.0 km | MPC · JPL |
| 413610 | 2005 UH_{228} | — | October 25, 2005 | Kitt Peak | Spacewatch | AGN | 1.2 km | MPC · JPL |
| 413611 | 2005 UJ_{233} | — | October 25, 2005 | Kitt Peak | Spacewatch | (18466) | 2.0 km | MPC · JPL |
| 413612 | 2005 UV_{233} | — | October 25, 2005 | Kitt Peak | Spacewatch | MRX | 1.2 km | MPC · JPL |
| 413613 | 2005 UR_{257} | — | October 25, 2005 | Kitt Peak | Spacewatch | AGN | 1.1 km | MPC · JPL |
| 413614 | 2005 UJ_{261} | — | October 25, 2005 | Mount Lemmon | Mount Lemmon Survey | · | 3.3 km | MPC · JPL |
| 413615 | 2005 UD_{262} | — | October 26, 2005 | Kitt Peak | Spacewatch | · | 1.7 km | MPC · JPL |
| 413616 | 2005 UW_{262} | — | October 1, 2005 | Kitt Peak | Spacewatch | PAD | 1.7 km | MPC · JPL |
| 413617 | 2005 UU_{275} | — | September 29, 2005 | Mount Lemmon | Mount Lemmon Survey | · | 1.8 km | MPC · JPL |
| 413618 | 2005 UO_{282} | — | October 26, 2005 | Kitt Peak | Spacewatch | · | 1.6 km | MPC · JPL |
| 413619 | 2005 UY_{288} | — | October 26, 2005 | Kitt Peak | Spacewatch | · | 1.6 km | MPC · JPL |
| 413620 | 2005 US_{293} | — | October 26, 2005 | Kitt Peak | Spacewatch | HOF | 2.5 km | MPC · JPL |
| 413621 | 2005 UE_{296} | — | October 26, 2005 | Kitt Peak | Spacewatch | DOR | 2.0 km | MPC · JPL |
| 413622 | 2005 UG_{307} | — | October 27, 2005 | Mount Lemmon | Mount Lemmon Survey | · | 1.8 km | MPC · JPL |
| 413623 | 2005 UM_{310} | — | October 29, 2005 | Mount Lemmon | Mount Lemmon Survey | · | 1.6 km | MPC · JPL |
| 413624 | 2005 UB_{314} | — | September 25, 2005 | Kitt Peak | Spacewatch | · | 2.0 km | MPC · JPL |
| 413625 | 2005 UP_{315} | — | October 25, 2005 | Kitt Peak | Spacewatch | · | 1.7 km | MPC · JPL |
| 413626 | 2005 UQ_{323} | — | October 28, 2005 | Mount Lemmon | Mount Lemmon Survey | · | 2.1 km | MPC · JPL |
| 413627 | 2005 UK_{350} | — | October 28, 2005 | Catalina | CSS | MRX | 1.0 km | MPC · JPL |
| 413628 | 2005 UV_{353} | — | October 29, 2005 | Catalina | CSS | · | 2.9 km | MPC · JPL |
| 413629 | 2005 UD_{367} | — | October 27, 2005 | Kitt Peak | Spacewatch | · | 2.1 km | MPC · JPL |
| 413630 | 2005 UK_{374} | — | October 27, 2005 | Kitt Peak | Spacewatch | HOF | 2.4 km | MPC · JPL |
| 413631 | 2005 UE_{379} | — | October 29, 2005 | Mount Lemmon | Mount Lemmon Survey | · | 2.3 km | MPC · JPL |
| 413632 | 2005 UA_{383} | — | October 22, 2005 | Kitt Peak | Spacewatch | AEO | 1.1 km | MPC · JPL |
| 413633 | 2005 UC_{388} | — | October 26, 2005 | Kitt Peak | Spacewatch | PAD | 1.9 km | MPC · JPL |
| 413634 | 2005 UQ_{391} | — | October 30, 2005 | Kitt Peak | Spacewatch | KOR | 1.2 km | MPC · JPL |
| 413635 | 2005 UX_{416} | — | October 25, 2005 | Kitt Peak | Spacewatch | · | 1.5 km | MPC · JPL |
| 413636 | 2005 UL_{417} | — | October 25, 2005 | Kitt Peak | Spacewatch | · | 1.9 km | MPC · JPL |
| 413637 | 2005 UL_{424} | — | October 12, 2005 | Kitt Peak | Spacewatch | · | 1.7 km | MPC · JPL |
| 413638 | 2005 UH_{439} | — | October 29, 2005 | Catalina | CSS | · | 3.7 km | MPC · JPL |
| 413639 | 2005 UR_{442} | — | October 30, 2005 | Kitt Peak | Spacewatch | · | 1.8 km | MPC · JPL |
| 413640 | 2005 UW_{442} | — | October 12, 2005 | Kitt Peak | Spacewatch | · | 1.9 km | MPC · JPL |
| 413641 | 2005 UO_{475} | — | October 22, 2005 | Kitt Peak | Spacewatch | · | 2.2 km | MPC · JPL |
| 413642 | 2005 UC_{483} | — | September 23, 2005 | Kitt Peak | Spacewatch | · | 1.9 km | MPC · JPL |
| 413643 | 2005 UX_{491} | — | October 24, 2005 | Palomar | NEAT | · | 2.0 km | MPC · JPL |
| 413644 | 2005 UZ_{498} | — | October 27, 2005 | Catalina | CSS | · | 2.2 km | MPC · JPL |
| 413645 | 2005 UV_{519} | — | October 1, 2005 | Mount Lemmon | Mount Lemmon Survey | · | 1.1 km | MPC · JPL |
| 413646 | 2005 VR_{4} | — | November 7, 2005 | Marly | Observatoire Naef | · | 2.1 km | MPC · JPL |
| 413647 | 2005 VS_{7} | — | November 12, 2005 | Wrightwood | J. W. Young | · | 2.5 km | MPC · JPL |
| 413648 | 2005 VZ_{7} | — | October 5, 2005 | Kitt Peak | Spacewatch | · | 1.9 km | MPC · JPL |
| 413649 | 2005 VU_{12} | — | November 3, 2005 | Mount Lemmon | Mount Lemmon Survey | AGN | 1.3 km | MPC · JPL |
| 413650 | 2005 VF_{14} | — | November 3, 2005 | Kitt Peak | Spacewatch | · | 2.2 km | MPC · JPL |
| 413651 | 2005 VA_{19} | — | November 1, 2005 | Kitt Peak | Spacewatch | · | 1.1 km | MPC · JPL |
| 413652 | 2005 VW_{19} | — | November 1, 2005 | Kitt Peak | Spacewatch | · | 1.9 km | MPC · JPL |
| 413653 | 2005 VP_{22} | — | April 25, 2004 | Kitt Peak | Spacewatch | · | 1.6 km | MPC · JPL |
| 413654 | 2005 VB_{35} | — | November 3, 2005 | Mount Lemmon | Mount Lemmon Survey | · | 2.1 km | MPC · JPL |
| 413655 | 2005 VP_{35} | — | October 10, 2005 | Kitt Peak | Spacewatch | · | 2.0 km | MPC · JPL |
| 413656 | 2005 VU_{53} | — | November 4, 2005 | Mount Lemmon | Mount Lemmon Survey | · | 2.1 km | MPC · JPL |
| 413657 | 2005 VW_{57} | — | November 4, 2005 | Mount Lemmon | Mount Lemmon Survey | · | 2.4 km | MPC · JPL |
| 413658 | 2005 VW_{58} | — | November 5, 2005 | Kitt Peak | Spacewatch | · | 2.2 km | MPC · JPL |
| 413659 | 2005 VL_{61} | — | November 5, 2005 | Socorro | LINEAR | · | 1.9 km | MPC · JPL |
| 413660 | 2005 VO_{74} | — | November 4, 2005 | Mount Lemmon | Mount Lemmon Survey | · | 2.2 km | MPC · JPL |
| 413661 | 2005 VQ_{74} | — | November 6, 2005 | Kitt Peak | Spacewatch | · | 1.7 km | MPC · JPL |
| 413662 | 2005 VL_{76} | — | November 4, 2005 | Catalina | CSS | · | 2.0 km | MPC · JPL |
| 413663 | 2005 VP_{92} | — | October 1, 2005 | Mount Lemmon | Mount Lemmon Survey | · | 1.8 km | MPC · JPL |
| 413664 | 2005 VA_{99} | — | April 5, 2003 | Kitt Peak | Spacewatch | NEM | 2.2 km | MPC · JPL |
| 413665 | 2005 VD_{99} | — | November 5, 2005 | Catalina | CSS | · | 1.8 km | MPC · JPL |
| 413666 | 2005 VJ_{119} | — | November 7, 2005 | Mauna Kea | F. Bernardi | centaur | 28 km | MPC · JPL |
| 413667 | 2005 VK_{127} | — | November 1, 2005 | Apache Point | A. C. Becker | · | 1.2 km | MPC · JPL |
| 413668 | 2005 VG_{128} | — | November 1, 2005 | Apache Point | A. C. Becker | (11882) | 1.7 km | MPC · JPL |
| 413669 | 2005 WK_{19} | — | November 24, 2005 | Palomar | NEAT | · | 2.2 km | MPC · JPL |
| 413670 | 2005 WS_{21} | — | November 21, 2005 | Kitt Peak | Spacewatch | · | 2.1 km | MPC · JPL |
| 413671 | 2005 WN_{31} | — | November 21, 2005 | Kitt Peak | Spacewatch | AGN | 1.1 km | MPC · JPL |
| 413672 | 2005 WP_{33} | — | November 21, 2005 | Kitt Peak | Spacewatch | · | 2.4 km | MPC · JPL |
| 413673 | 2005 WD_{34} | — | November 21, 2005 | Kitt Peak | Spacewatch | · | 1.9 km | MPC · JPL |
| 413674 | 2005 WG_{47} | — | November 25, 2005 | Mount Lemmon | Mount Lemmon Survey | · | 2.3 km | MPC · JPL |
| 413675 | 2005 WR_{67} | — | November 22, 2005 | Kitt Peak | Spacewatch | · | 1.7 km | MPC · JPL |
| 413676 | 2005 WW_{76} | — | November 25, 2005 | Kitt Peak | Spacewatch | · | 1.6 km | MPC · JPL |
| 413677 | 2005 WF_{79} | — | November 25, 2005 | Kitt Peak | Spacewatch | HOF | 2.6 km | MPC · JPL |
| 413678 | 2005 WD_{80} | — | November 25, 2005 | Mount Lemmon | Mount Lemmon Survey | · | 1.7 km | MPC · JPL |
| 413679 | 2005 WR_{88} | — | November 22, 2005 | Kitt Peak | Spacewatch | · | 2.1 km | MPC · JPL |
| 413680 | 2005 WK_{114} | — | November 6, 2005 | Mount Lemmon | Mount Lemmon Survey | · | 1.9 km | MPC · JPL |
| 413681 | 2005 WC_{136} | — | November 26, 2005 | Kitt Peak | Spacewatch | KOR | 1.2 km | MPC · JPL |
| 413682 | 2005 WM_{152} | — | October 27, 2005 | Mount Lemmon | Mount Lemmon Survey | · | 2.3 km | MPC · JPL |
| 413683 | 2005 WR_{170} | — | November 22, 2005 | Kitt Peak | Spacewatch | · | 2.0 km | MPC · JPL |
| 413684 | 2005 WL_{173} | — | November 1, 2005 | Mount Lemmon | Mount Lemmon Survey | AEO | 1 km | MPC · JPL |
| 413685 | 2005 WL_{211} | — | November 25, 2005 | Mount Lemmon | Mount Lemmon Survey | AGN | 1.1 km | MPC · JPL |
| 413686 | 2005 XR_{23} | — | December 2, 2005 | Socorro | LINEAR | · | 2.2 km | MPC · JPL |
| 413687 | 2005 XR_{34} | — | November 26, 2005 | Kitt Peak | Spacewatch | · | 1.8 km | MPC · JPL |
| 413688 | 2005 XF_{43} | — | December 2, 2005 | Kitt Peak | Spacewatch | · | 1.8 km | MPC · JPL |
| 413689 | 2005 XB_{52} | — | December 2, 2005 | Kitt Peak | Spacewatch | · | 2.4 km | MPC · JPL |
| 413690 | 2005 XS_{58} | — | December 2, 2005 | Mount Lemmon | Mount Lemmon Survey | · | 1.7 km | MPC · JPL |
| 413691 | 2005 XP_{63} | — | December 5, 2005 | Mount Lemmon | Mount Lemmon Survey | KOR | 1.2 km | MPC · JPL |
| 413692 | 2005 XX_{64} | — | December 7, 2005 | Catalina | CSS | · | 2.3 km | MPC · JPL |
| 413693 | 2005 XX_{83} | — | December 6, 2005 | Catalina | CSS | · | 2.0 km | MPC · JPL |
| 413694 | 2005 XA_{111} | — | December 1, 2005 | Kitt Peak | M. W. Buie | · | 1.6 km | MPC · JPL |
| 413695 | 2005 YH_{2} | — | December 21, 2005 | Kitt Peak | Spacewatch | · | 1.6 km | MPC · JPL |
| 413696 | 2005 YP_{2} | — | October 1, 2005 | Mount Lemmon | Mount Lemmon Survey | MRX | 940 m | MPC · JPL |
| 413697 | 2005 YA_{14} | — | December 22, 2005 | Kitt Peak | Spacewatch | · | 1.7 km | MPC · JPL |
| 413698 | 2005 YS_{23} | — | December 24, 2005 | Kitt Peak | Spacewatch | · | 1.9 km | MPC · JPL |
| 413699 | 2005 YW_{23} | — | December 4, 2005 | Mount Lemmon | Mount Lemmon Survey | · | 1.8 km | MPC · JPL |
| 413700 | 2005 YH_{32} | — | December 22, 2005 | Kitt Peak | Spacewatch | · | 2.8 km | MPC · JPL |

== 413701–413800 ==
back to top

| Designation | | | Discovery | | | Properties | | Ref |
| Permanent | Provisional | Named after | Date | Site | Discoverer(s) | Category | Diam. | Ref |
|---|---|---|---|---|---|---|---|---|
| 413701 | 2005 YR_{34} | — | December 24, 2005 | Kitt Peak | Spacewatch | · | 2.9 km | MPC · JPL |
| 413702 | 2005 YY_{44} | — | December 25, 2005 | Kitt Peak | Spacewatch | · | 2.0 km | MPC · JPL |
| 413703 | 2005 YQ_{59} | — | October 3, 2005 | Catalina | CSS | · | 1.7 km | MPC · JPL |
| 413704 | 2005 YW_{68} | — | December 5, 2005 | Mount Lemmon | Mount Lemmon Survey | · | 2.0 km | MPC · JPL |
| 413705 | 2005 YK_{75} | — | December 8, 2005 | Kitt Peak | Spacewatch | · | 2.1 km | MPC · JPL |
| 413706 | 2005 YK_{85} | — | December 2, 2005 | Mount Lemmon | Mount Lemmon Survey | · | 1.9 km | MPC · JPL |
| 413707 | 2005 YU_{143} | — | December 28, 2005 | Mount Lemmon | Mount Lemmon Survey | AEO | 1.7 km | MPC · JPL |
| 413708 | 2005 YV_{162} | — | December 27, 2005 | Mount Lemmon | Mount Lemmon Survey | · | 1.7 km | MPC · JPL |
| 413709 | 2005 YW_{165} | — | November 10, 2005 | Mount Lemmon | Mount Lemmon Survey | (16286) | 2.3 km | MPC · JPL |
| 413710 | 2005 YA_{169} | — | December 30, 2005 | Kitt Peak | Spacewatch | AGN | 1.1 km | MPC · JPL |
| 413711 | 2005 YG_{192} | — | December 30, 2005 | Kitt Peak | Spacewatch | · | 590 m | MPC · JPL |
| 413712 | 2005 YM_{237} | — | December 28, 2005 | Kitt Peak | Spacewatch | L5 | 7.4 km | MPC · JPL |
| 413713 | 2005 YX_{237} | — | December 28, 2005 | Kitt Peak | Spacewatch | BRA | 1.3 km | MPC · JPL |
| 413714 | 2005 YC_{282} | — | December 26, 2005 | Mount Lemmon | Mount Lemmon Survey | JUN | 1.2 km | MPC · JPL |
| 413715 | 2006 AB_{18} | — | December 27, 2005 | Mount Lemmon | Mount Lemmon Survey | · | 610 m | MPC · JPL |
| 413716 | 2006 AO_{51} | — | November 30, 2005 | Mount Lemmon | Mount Lemmon Survey | · | 2.4 km | MPC · JPL |
| 413717 | 2006 AV_{100} | — | January 7, 2006 | Mount Lemmon | Mount Lemmon Survey | · | 1.5 km | MPC · JPL |
| 413718 | 2006 AH_{104} | — | January 6, 2006 | Kitt Peak | Spacewatch | · | 1.3 km | MPC · JPL |
| 413719 | 2006 BF_{26} | — | January 22, 2006 | Anderson Mesa | LONEOS | · | 2.3 km | MPC · JPL |
| 413720 | 2006 BH_{36} | — | January 10, 2006 | Mount Lemmon | Mount Lemmon Survey | · | 2.1 km | MPC · JPL |
| 413721 | 2006 BF_{67} | — | January 23, 2006 | Kitt Peak | Spacewatch | EOS | 1.9 km | MPC · JPL |
| 413722 | 2006 BO_{70} | — | January 23, 2006 | Kitt Peak | Spacewatch | · | 3.1 km | MPC · JPL |
| 413723 | 2006 BK_{74} | — | January 23, 2006 | Kitt Peak | Spacewatch | · | 1.7 km | MPC · JPL |
| 413724 | 2006 BY_{80} | — | January 23, 2006 | Kitt Peak | Spacewatch | · | 2.8 km | MPC · JPL |
| 413725 | 2006 BV_{108} | — | January 25, 2006 | Kitt Peak | Spacewatch | · | 2.4 km | MPC · JPL |
| 413726 | 2006 BF_{113} | — | January 25, 2006 | Kitt Peak | Spacewatch | · | 1.8 km | MPC · JPL |
| 413727 | 2006 BK_{117} | — | January 26, 2006 | Kitt Peak | Spacewatch | · | 2.2 km | MPC · JPL |
| 413728 | 2006 BD_{121} | — | January 26, 2006 | Kitt Peak | Spacewatch | EOS | 1.8 km | MPC · JPL |
| 413729 | 2006 BX_{127} | — | January 26, 2006 | Kitt Peak | Spacewatch | · | 710 m | MPC · JPL |
| 413730 | 2006 BD_{139} | — | January 28, 2006 | Mount Lemmon | Mount Lemmon Survey | · | 2.4 km | MPC · JPL |
| 413731 | 2006 BF_{155} | — | January 25, 2006 | Kitt Peak | Spacewatch | · | 750 m | MPC · JPL |
| 413732 | 2006 BX_{162} | — | January 7, 2006 | Mount Lemmon | Mount Lemmon Survey | · | 2.1 km | MPC · JPL |
| 413733 | 2006 BM_{175} | — | January 27, 2006 | Kitt Peak | Spacewatch | · | 2.4 km | MPC · JPL |
| 413734 | 2006 BY_{180} | — | January 27, 2006 | Mount Lemmon | Mount Lemmon Survey | · | 1.5 km | MPC · JPL |
| 413735 | 2006 BO_{205} | — | January 31, 2006 | Mount Lemmon | Mount Lemmon Survey | · | 640 m | MPC · JPL |
| 413736 | 2006 BT_{208} | — | January 31, 2006 | Mount Lemmon | Mount Lemmon Survey | KOR | 1.2 km | MPC · JPL |
| 413737 | 2006 BL_{216} | — | January 26, 2006 | Catalina | CSS | · | 2.4 km | MPC · JPL |
| 413738 | 2006 BU_{229} | — | January 23, 2006 | Kitt Peak | Spacewatch | · | 1.3 km | MPC · JPL |
| 413739 | 2006 BO_{232} | — | January 31, 2006 | Kitt Peak | Spacewatch | · | 2.3 km | MPC · JPL |
| 413740 | 2006 BG_{236} | — | January 23, 2006 | Kitt Peak | Spacewatch | · | 2.3 km | MPC · JPL |
| 413741 | 2006 BN_{243} | — | January 31, 2006 | Kitt Peak | Spacewatch | · | 810 m | MPC · JPL |
| 413742 | 2006 BZ_{247} | — | January 31, 2006 | Kitt Peak | Spacewatch | · | 870 m | MPC · JPL |
| 413743 | 2006 BK_{250} | — | January 31, 2006 | Kitt Peak | Spacewatch | · | 3.3 km | MPC · JPL |
| 413744 | 2006 BP_{264} | — | January 31, 2006 | Kitt Peak | Spacewatch | · | 830 m | MPC · JPL |
| 413745 | 2006 BS_{270} | — | January 31, 2006 | Anderson Mesa | LONEOS | · | 2.4 km | MPC · JPL |
| 413746 | 2006 BE_{279} | — | January 30, 2006 | Kitt Peak | Spacewatch | · | 1.5 km | MPC · JPL |
| 413747 | 2006 CP_{5} | — | January 9, 2006 | Kitt Peak | Spacewatch | · | 2.0 km | MPC · JPL |
| 413748 | 2006 CS_{14} | — | February 1, 2006 | Kitt Peak | Spacewatch | · | 3.0 km | MPC · JPL |
| 413749 | 2006 CN_{24} | — | January 10, 2006 | Mount Lemmon | Mount Lemmon Survey | EOS | 2.4 km | MPC · JPL |
| 413750 | 2006 CS_{34} | — | January 27, 2006 | Mount Lemmon | Mount Lemmon Survey | · | 1.9 km | MPC · JPL |
| 413751 | 2006 CT_{41} | — | October 31, 2005 | Mauna Kea | A. Boattini | EOS | 2.2 km | MPC · JPL |
| 413752 | 2006 DB_{14} | — | February 22, 2006 | Catalina | CSS | · | 4.1 km | MPC · JPL |
| 413753 | 2006 DT_{23} | — | January 30, 2006 | Kitt Peak | Spacewatch | · | 2.8 km | MPC · JPL |
| 413754 | 2006 DK_{26} | — | January 26, 2006 | Kitt Peak | Spacewatch | · | 530 m | MPC · JPL |
| 413755 | 2006 DS_{30} | — | February 20, 2006 | Kitt Peak | Spacewatch | EOS | 4.2 km | MPC · JPL |
| 413756 | 2006 DW_{99} | — | February 25, 2006 | Kitt Peak | Spacewatch | · | 2.6 km | MPC · JPL |
| 413757 | 2006 DM_{103} | — | October 13, 2004 | Kitt Peak | Spacewatch | · | 640 m | MPC · JPL |
| 413758 | 2006 DN_{113} | — | February 27, 2006 | Kitt Peak | Spacewatch | EOS | 2.4 km | MPC · JPL |
| 413759 | 2006 DZ_{119} | — | February 20, 2006 | Catalina | CSS | · | 3.2 km | MPC · JPL |
| 413760 | 2006 DR_{131} | — | February 25, 2006 | Kitt Peak | Spacewatch | · | 4.0 km | MPC · JPL |
| 413761 | 2006 DL_{156} | — | February 27, 2006 | Kitt Peak | Spacewatch | · | 2.3 km | MPC · JPL |
| 413762 | 2006 DK_{166} | — | February 27, 2006 | Kitt Peak | Spacewatch | EOS | 2.0 km | MPC · JPL |
| 413763 | 2006 DX_{183} | — | February 27, 2006 | Kitt Peak | Spacewatch | · | 800 m | MPC · JPL |
| 413764 | 2006 DT_{195} | — | February 20, 2006 | Catalina | CSS | · | 4.7 km | MPC · JPL |
| 413765 | 2006 DN_{205} | — | February 25, 2006 | Mount Lemmon | Mount Lemmon Survey | EOS | 1.6 km | MPC · JPL |
| 413766 | 2006 DD_{215} | — | February 20, 2006 | Kitt Peak | Spacewatch | EOS | 1.7 km | MPC · JPL |
| 413767 | 2006 EY_{2} | — | March 2, 2006 | Kitt Peak | Spacewatch | · | 600 m | MPC · JPL |
| 413768 | 2006 EL_{15} | — | March 2, 2006 | Kitt Peak | Spacewatch | · | 500 m | MPC · JPL |
| 413769 | 2006 EV_{40} | — | March 4, 2006 | Mount Lemmon | Mount Lemmon Survey | · | 1.9 km | MPC · JPL |
| 413770 | 2006 FA_{20} | — | October 9, 2004 | Kitt Peak | Spacewatch | · | 790 m | MPC · JPL |
| 413771 | 2006 FW_{27} | — | March 24, 2006 | Mount Lemmon | Mount Lemmon Survey | EOS | 2.1 km | MPC · JPL |
| 413772 | 2006 FU_{29} | — | March 24, 2006 | Mount Lemmon | Mount Lemmon Survey | · | 770 m | MPC · JPL |
| 413773 | 2006 GU_{33} | — | April 7, 2006 | Mount Lemmon | Mount Lemmon Survey | · | 3.2 km | MPC · JPL |
| 413774 | 2006 GM_{46} | — | April 8, 2006 | Kitt Peak | Spacewatch | · | 830 m | MPC · JPL |
| 413775 | 2006 GF_{51} | — | April 2, 2006 | Anderson Mesa | LONEOS | · | 3.6 km | MPC · JPL |
| 413776 | 2006 GS_{54} | — | October 19, 2003 | Kitt Peak | Spacewatch | · | 2.6 km | MPC · JPL |
| 413777 | 2006 HU_{5} | — | April 19, 2006 | Palomar | NEAT | · | 820 m | MPC · JPL |
| 413778 | 2006 HZ_{6} | — | April 9, 2006 | Catalina | CSS | · | 4.3 km | MPC · JPL |
| 413779 | 2006 HR_{15} | — | April 20, 2006 | Kitt Peak | Spacewatch | · | 2.9 km | MPC · JPL |
| 413780 | 2006 HS_{25} | — | April 20, 2006 | Kitt Peak | Spacewatch | V | 720 m | MPC · JPL |
| 413781 | 2006 HY_{27} | — | April 20, 2006 | Kitt Peak | Spacewatch | V | 660 m | MPC · JPL |
| 413782 | 2006 HG_{28} | — | April 20, 2006 | Kitt Peak | Spacewatch | · | 3.6 km | MPC · JPL |
| 413783 | 2006 HX_{32} | — | April 19, 2006 | Kitt Peak | Spacewatch | · | 3.7 km | MPC · JPL |
| 413784 | 2006 HA_{45} | — | April 25, 2006 | Kitt Peak | Spacewatch | · | 3.4 km | MPC · JPL |
| 413785 | 2006 HE_{46} | — | April 25, 2006 | Catalina | CSS | · | 3.0 km | MPC · JPL |
| 413786 | 2006 HA_{53} | — | April 19, 2006 | Anderson Mesa | LONEOS | · | 3.6 km | MPC · JPL |
| 413787 | 2006 HH_{68} | — | April 24, 2006 | Mount Lemmon | Mount Lemmon Survey | · | 1.5 km | MPC · JPL |
| 413788 | 2006 HE_{72} | — | April 25, 2006 | Kitt Peak | Spacewatch | · | 870 m | MPC · JPL |
| 413789 | 2006 HP_{87} | — | April 30, 2006 | Kitt Peak | Spacewatch | · | 2.5 km | MPC · JPL |
| 413790 | 2006 HZ_{87} | — | April 30, 2006 | Kitt Peak | Spacewatch | VER | 2.6 km | MPC · JPL |
| 413791 | 2006 HK_{88} | — | April 30, 2006 | Kitt Peak | Spacewatch | · | 2.3 km | MPC · JPL |
| 413792 | 2006 HU_{101} | — | April 30, 2006 | Kitt Peak | Spacewatch | · | 1.1 km | MPC · JPL |
| 413793 | 2006 HU_{103} | — | April 30, 2006 | Kitt Peak | Spacewatch | · | 3.2 km | MPC · JPL |
| 413794 | 2006 HS_{107} | — | April 30, 2006 | Kitt Peak | Spacewatch | · | 3.7 km | MPC · JPL |
| 413795 | 2006 HB_{119} | — | April 30, 2006 | Kitt Peak | Spacewatch | · | 3.2 km | MPC · JPL |
| 413796 | 2006 HH_{151} | — | April 30, 2006 | Anderson Mesa | LONEOS | · | 940 m | MPC · JPL |
| 413797 | 2006 HG_{152} | — | April 19, 2006 | Mount Lemmon | Mount Lemmon Survey | · | 3.6 km | MPC · JPL |
| 413798 | 2006 HQ_{153} | — | April 30, 2006 | Kitt Peak | Spacewatch | EOS | 2.3 km | MPC · JPL |
| 413799 | 2006 JN_{1} | — | May 1, 2006 | Kitt Peak | Spacewatch | · | 3.4 km | MPC · JPL |
| 413800 | 2006 JK_{3} | — | May 2, 2006 | Mount Lemmon | Mount Lemmon Survey | · | 5.3 km | MPC · JPL |

== 413801–413900 ==
back to top

| Designation | | | Discovery | | | Properties | | Ref |
| Permanent | Provisional | Named after | Date | Site | Discoverer(s) | Category | Diam. | Ref |
|---|---|---|---|---|---|---|---|---|
| 413801 | 2006 JG_{10} | — | May 1, 2006 | Kitt Peak | Spacewatch | · | 950 m | MPC · JPL |
| 413802 | 2006 JT_{12} | — | May 1, 2006 | Kitt Peak | Spacewatch | · | 2.4 km | MPC · JPL |
| 413803 | 2006 JE_{31} | — | May 3, 2006 | Kitt Peak | Spacewatch | · | 4.4 km | MPC · JPL |
| 413804 | 2006 JW_{33} | — | May 4, 2006 | Kitt Peak | Spacewatch | · | 3.1 km | MPC · JPL |
| 413805 | 2006 JC_{44} | — | May 6, 2006 | Kitt Peak | Spacewatch | · | 4.5 km | MPC · JPL |
| 413806 | 2006 JH_{49} | — | May 1, 2006 | Kitt Peak | Spacewatch | · | 760 m | MPC · JPL |
| 413807 | 2006 KQ_{18} | — | May 21, 2006 | Kitt Peak | Spacewatch | · | 4.1 km | MPC · JPL |
| 413808 | 2006 KX_{30} | — | May 20, 2006 | Kitt Peak | Spacewatch | · | 790 m | MPC · JPL |
| 413809 | 2006 KF_{45} | — | March 1, 2005 | Kitt Peak | Spacewatch | ELF | 3.2 km | MPC · JPL |
| 413810 | 2006 KZ_{68} | — | May 20, 2006 | Kitt Peak | Spacewatch | · | 4.0 km | MPC · JPL |
| 413811 | 2006 KA_{76} | — | May 24, 2006 | Palomar | NEAT | · | 4.4 km | MPC · JPL |
| 413812 | 2006 KN_{87} | — | May 24, 2006 | Kitt Peak | Spacewatch | · | 880 m | MPC · JPL |
| 413813 | 2006 KM_{100} | — | May 29, 2006 | Vail-Jarnac | Jarnac | H | 460 m | MPC · JPL |
| 413814 | 2006 LF_{3} | — | June 15, 2006 | Kitt Peak | Spacewatch | · | 3.0 km | MPC · JPL |
| 413815 | 2006 PO_{8} | — | August 13, 2006 | Palomar | NEAT | · | 1.1 km | MPC · JPL |
| 413816 | 2006 PE_{11} | — | August 13, 2006 | Palomar | NEAT | NYS | 1.3 km | MPC · JPL |
| 413817 | 2006 PN_{16} | — | August 15, 2006 | Palomar | NEAT | · | 2.2 km | MPC · JPL |
| 413818 | 2006 QC_{7} | — | August 17, 2006 | Palomar | NEAT | NYS | 1.1 km | MPC · JPL |
| 413819 | 2006 QU_{17} | — | August 17, 2006 | Palomar | NEAT | · | 1.1 km | MPC · JPL |
| 413820 | 2006 QR_{89} | — | August 29, 2006 | Kitt Peak | Spacewatch | AMO | 660 m | MPC · JPL |
| 413821 | 2006 QY_{104} | — | August 28, 2006 | Catalina | CSS | · | 1.6 km | MPC · JPL |
| 413822 | 2006 QO_{133} | — | August 24, 2006 | Socorro | LINEAR | · | 1.7 km | MPC · JPL |
| 413823 | 2006 QJ_{134} | — | August 25, 2006 | Socorro | LINEAR | · | 1.1 km | MPC · JPL |
| 413824 | 2006 QH_{146} | — | August 18, 2006 | Kitt Peak | Spacewatch | · | 1.1 km | MPC · JPL |
| 413825 | 2006 QN_{147} | — | August 18, 2006 | Kitt Peak | Spacewatch | · | 1.1 km | MPC · JPL |
| 413826 | 2006 QR_{162} | — | August 21, 2006 | Kitt Peak | Spacewatch | RAF | 820 m | MPC · JPL |
| 413827 | 2006 RH_{25} | — | August 29, 2006 | Kitt Peak | Spacewatch | · | 1.2 km | MPC · JPL |
| 413828 | 2006 RS_{33} | — | September 12, 2006 | Catalina | CSS | · | 1.2 km | MPC · JPL |
| 413829 | 2006 RK_{58} | — | September 15, 2006 | Kitt Peak | Spacewatch | NYS | 1.5 km | MPC · JPL |
| 413830 | 2006 RV_{67} | — | September 15, 2006 | Kitt Peak | Spacewatch | · | 910 m | MPC · JPL |
| 413831 | 2006 RG_{80} | — | September 15, 2006 | Kitt Peak | Spacewatch | · | 980 m | MPC · JPL |
| 413832 | 2006 RR_{122} | — | September 15, 2006 | Kitt Peak | Spacewatch | · | 1.0 km | MPC · JPL |
| 413833 | 2006 SJ_{20} | — | September 19, 2006 | Catalina | CSS | · | 1.0 km | MPC · JPL |
| 413834 | 2006 SR_{22} | — | September 17, 2006 | Anderson Mesa | LONEOS | 3:2 | 6.1 km | MPC · JPL |
| 413835 | 2006 SC_{26} | — | August 29, 2006 | Catalina | CSS | · | 1.5 km | MPC · JPL |
| 413836 | 2006 SK_{31} | — | September 17, 2006 | Socorro | LINEAR | · | 1.2 km | MPC · JPL |
| 413837 | 2006 SH_{87} | — | September 18, 2006 | Kitt Peak | Spacewatch | 3:2 · SHU | 4.0 km | MPC · JPL |
| 413838 | 2006 SF_{92} | — | September 18, 2006 | Kitt Peak | Spacewatch | · | 1.2 km | MPC · JPL |
| 413839 | 2006 SK_{108} | — | September 19, 2006 | Kitt Peak | Spacewatch | · | 970 m | MPC · JPL |
| 413840 | 2006 SS_{115} | — | September 24, 2006 | Anderson Mesa | LONEOS | · | 1.4 km | MPC · JPL |
| 413841 | 2006 SY_{116} | — | September 24, 2006 | Kitt Peak | Spacewatch | · | 820 m | MPC · JPL |
| 413842 | 2006 SU_{186} | — | September 25, 2006 | Mount Lemmon | Mount Lemmon Survey | H | 490 m | MPC · JPL |
| 413843 | 2006 SF_{201} | — | September 18, 2006 | Kitt Peak | Spacewatch | 3:2 | 4.5 km | MPC · JPL |
| 413844 | 2006 SA_{210} | — | September 19, 2006 | Kitt Peak | Spacewatch | · | 960 m | MPC · JPL |
| 413845 | 2006 SN_{235} | — | August 19, 2006 | Kitt Peak | Spacewatch | · | 1.1 km | MPC · JPL |
| 413846 | 2006 SB_{247} | — | September 15, 2006 | Kitt Peak | Spacewatch | · | 1.5 km | MPC · JPL |
| 413847 | 2006 SQ_{343} | — | September 28, 2006 | Kitt Peak | Spacewatch | PHO | 1.1 km | MPC · JPL |
| 413848 | 2006 ST_{354} | — | September 30, 2006 | Mount Lemmon | Mount Lemmon Survey | H | 580 m | MPC · JPL |
| 413849 | 2006 SL_{361} | — | September 30, 2006 | Mount Lemmon | Mount Lemmon Survey | · | 1.0 km | MPC · JPL |
| 413850 | 2006 SY_{392} | — | September 27, 2006 | Mount Lemmon | Mount Lemmon Survey | EUN | 1.4 km | MPC · JPL |
| 413851 | 2006 SD_{399} | — | September 17, 2006 | Kitt Peak | Spacewatch | · | 1.1 km | MPC · JPL |
| 413852 | 2006 SX_{399} | — | September 18, 2006 | Kitt Peak | Spacewatch | · | 690 m | MPC · JPL |
| 413853 | 2006 SA_{407} | — | September 28, 2006 | Kitt Peak | Spacewatch | 3:2 · SHU | 4.2 km | MPC · JPL |
| 413854 | 2006 TL_{38} | — | October 12, 2006 | Kitt Peak | Spacewatch | · | 700 m | MPC · JPL |
| 413855 | 2006 TM_{38} | — | October 12, 2006 | Kitt Peak | Spacewatch | · | 950 m | MPC · JPL |
| 413856 | 2006 TS_{48} | — | September 30, 2006 | Mount Lemmon | Mount Lemmon Survey | MAR | 760 m | MPC · JPL |
| 413857 | 2006 TW_{80} | — | October 13, 2006 | Kitt Peak | Spacewatch | · | 1.5 km | MPC · JPL |
| 413858 | 2006 TT_{104} | — | September 30, 2006 | Catalina | CSS | H | 560 m | MPC · JPL |
| 413859 | 2006 UO_{40} | — | October 16, 2006 | Catalina | CSS | H | 540 m | MPC · JPL |
| 413860 | 2006 UJ_{41} | — | October 16, 2006 | Kitt Peak | Spacewatch | · | 860 m | MPC · JPL |
| 413861 | 2006 UY_{50} | — | September 26, 2006 | Kitt Peak | Spacewatch | 3:2 · SHU | 4.7 km | MPC · JPL |
| 413862 | 2006 UY_{54} | — | October 17, 2006 | Catalina | CSS | T_{j} (2.98) · 3:2 | 5.9 km | MPC · JPL |
| 413863 | 2006 UE_{75} | — | October 17, 2006 | Catalina | CSS | H | 630 m | MPC · JPL |
| 413864 | 2006 UJ_{99} | — | September 30, 2006 | Mount Lemmon | Mount Lemmon Survey | · | 730 m | MPC · JPL |
| 413865 | 2006 UV_{113} | — | September 18, 2006 | Kitt Peak | Spacewatch | 3:2 | 4.6 km | MPC · JPL |
| 413866 | 2006 UV_{115} | — | October 19, 2006 | Kitt Peak | Spacewatch | H | 500 m | MPC · JPL |
| 413867 | 2006 UW_{126} | — | October 2, 2006 | Mount Lemmon | Mount Lemmon Survey | · | 830 m | MPC · JPL |
| 413868 | 2006 UE_{142} | — | October 19, 2006 | Kitt Peak | Spacewatch | · | 980 m | MPC · JPL |
| 413869 | 2006 UZ_{150} | — | October 20, 2006 | Mount Lemmon | Mount Lemmon Survey | · | 680 m | MPC · JPL |
| 413870 | 2006 UN_{208} | — | October 23, 2006 | Catalina | CSS | H | 780 m | MPC · JPL |
| 413871 | 2006 UU_{208} | — | October 19, 2006 | Kitt Peak | Spacewatch | · | 820 m | MPC · JPL |
| 413872 | 2006 UY_{218} | — | October 16, 2006 | Catalina | CSS | · | 1.3 km | MPC · JPL |
| 413873 | 2006 UA_{255} | — | October 27, 2006 | Mount Lemmon | Mount Lemmon Survey | · | 890 m | MPC · JPL |
| 413874 | 2006 UQ_{262} | — | October 29, 2006 | Mount Lemmon | Mount Lemmon Survey | · | 1.2 km | MPC · JPL |
| 413875 | 2006 UP_{265} | — | October 27, 2006 | Catalina | CSS | · | 2.1 km | MPC · JPL |
| 413876 | 2006 UM_{269} | — | October 27, 2006 | Mount Lemmon | Mount Lemmon Survey | H | 600 m | MPC · JPL |
| 413877 | 2006 UL_{271} | — | October 27, 2006 | Mount Lemmon | Mount Lemmon Survey | · | 1 km | MPC · JPL |
| 413878 | 2006 UL_{283} | — | October 28, 2006 | Kitt Peak | Spacewatch | · | 910 m | MPC · JPL |
| 413879 | 2006 UN_{335} | — | October 17, 2006 | Mount Lemmon | Mount Lemmon Survey | · | 1.3 km | MPC · JPL |
| 413880 | 2006 VX_{6} | — | November 10, 2006 | Kitt Peak | Spacewatch | · | 1.9 km | MPC · JPL |
| 413881 | 2006 VX_{30} | — | November 10, 2006 | Kitt Peak | Spacewatch | · | 1.3 km | MPC · JPL |
| 413882 | 2006 VX_{49} | — | November 10, 2006 | Kitt Peak | Spacewatch | · | 1.2 km | MPC · JPL |
| 413883 | 2006 VQ_{59} | — | October 22, 2006 | Mount Lemmon | Mount Lemmon Survey | · | 1.6 km | MPC · JPL |
| 413884 | 2006 VR_{63} | — | September 28, 2006 | Mount Lemmon | Mount Lemmon Survey | (5) | 1.1 km | MPC · JPL |
| 413885 | 2006 VW_{68} | — | November 11, 2006 | Kitt Peak | Spacewatch | (5) | 1.1 km | MPC · JPL |
| 413886 | 2006 VK_{77} | — | November 12, 2006 | Mount Lemmon | Mount Lemmon Survey | · | 1.0 km | MPC · JPL |
| 413887 | 2006 VT_{81} | — | November 13, 2006 | Mount Lemmon | Mount Lemmon Survey | H | 430 m | MPC · JPL |
| 413888 | 2006 VH_{94} | — | November 10, 2006 | Kitt Peak | Spacewatch | · | 1.4 km | MPC · JPL |
| 413889 | 2006 VX_{104} | — | September 30, 2006 | Mount Lemmon | Mount Lemmon Survey | · | 950 m | MPC · JPL |
| 413890 | 2006 VN_{109} | — | November 13, 2006 | Mount Lemmon | Mount Lemmon Survey | (5) | 920 m | MPC · JPL |
| 413891 | 2006 VV_{119} | — | November 14, 2006 | Kitt Peak | Spacewatch | · | 2.0 km | MPC · JPL |
| 413892 | 2006 VC_{124} | — | October 20, 2006 | Mount Lemmon | Mount Lemmon Survey | · | 1.5 km | MPC · JPL |
| 413893 | 2006 VV_{135} | — | November 15, 2006 | Kitt Peak | Spacewatch | · | 1.3 km | MPC · JPL |
| 413894 | 2006 VH_{139} | — | November 15, 2006 | Kitt Peak | Spacewatch | H | 710 m | MPC · JPL |
| 413895 | 2006 VW_{143} | — | October 29, 2006 | Catalina | CSS | MAR | 1.2 km | MPC · JPL |
| 413896 | 2006 VU_{145} | — | November 15, 2006 | Catalina | CSS | · | 1.4 km | MPC · JPL |
| 413897 | 2006 VO_{169} | — | November 11, 2006 | Kitt Peak | Spacewatch | (5) | 1.4 km | MPC · JPL |
| 413898 | 2006 WM_{5} | — | September 27, 2006 | Mount Lemmon | Mount Lemmon Survey | · | 1.3 km | MPC · JPL |
| 413899 | 2006 WN_{5} | — | November 16, 2006 | Kitt Peak | Spacewatch | T_{j} (2.98) · 3:2 | 4.3 km | MPC · JPL |
| 413900 | 2006 WO_{6} | — | November 16, 2006 | Kitt Peak | Spacewatch | · | 1.1 km | MPC · JPL |

== 413901–414000 ==
back to top

| Designation | | | Discovery | | | Properties | | Ref |
| Permanent | Provisional | Named after | Date | Site | Discoverer(s) | Category | Diam. | Ref |
|---|---|---|---|---|---|---|---|---|
| 413901 | 2006 WS_{7} | — | November 16, 2006 | Kitt Peak | Spacewatch | · | 1.0 km | MPC · JPL |
| 413902 | 2006 WL_{16} | — | October 4, 2006 | Mount Lemmon | Mount Lemmon Survey | · | 1.2 km | MPC · JPL |
| 413903 | 2006 WQ_{22} | — | November 17, 2006 | Mount Lemmon | Mount Lemmon Survey | · | 930 m | MPC · JPL |
| 413904 | 2006 WU_{23} | — | November 17, 2006 | Mount Lemmon | Mount Lemmon Survey | · | 1.3 km | MPC · JPL |
| 413905 | 2006 WX_{26} | — | November 18, 2006 | Socorro | LINEAR | H | 740 m | MPC · JPL |
| 413906 | 2006 WF_{27} | — | November 18, 2006 | Catalina | CSS | · | 1.7 km | MPC · JPL |
| 413907 | 2006 WO_{29} | — | November 22, 2006 | Mount Lemmon | Mount Lemmon Survey | · | 3.4 km | MPC · JPL |
| 413908 | 2006 WK_{40} | — | November 16, 2006 | Kitt Peak | Spacewatch | · | 1.4 km | MPC · JPL |
| 413909 | 2006 WX_{40} | — | September 28, 2006 | Mount Lemmon | Mount Lemmon Survey | · | 1.5 km | MPC · JPL |
| 413910 | 2006 WD_{50} | — | November 16, 2006 | Mount Lemmon | Mount Lemmon Survey | · | 1.3 km | MPC · JPL |
| 413911 | 2006 WT_{61} | — | November 17, 2006 | Socorro | LINEAR | · | 2.0 km | MPC · JPL |
| 413912 | 2006 WN_{69} | — | October 23, 2006 | Mount Lemmon | Mount Lemmon Survey | (194) | 2.7 km | MPC · JPL |
| 413913 | 2006 WL_{74} | — | November 18, 2006 | Kitt Peak | Spacewatch | · | 1.1 km | MPC · JPL |
| 413914 | 2006 WB_{91} | — | November 11, 2006 | Kitt Peak | Spacewatch | · | 1.6 km | MPC · JPL |
| 413915 | 2006 WM_{95} | — | November 19, 2006 | Kitt Peak | Spacewatch | · | 1.0 km | MPC · JPL |
| 413916 | 2006 WT_{96} | — | October 27, 2006 | Mount Lemmon | Mount Lemmon Survey | · | 930 m | MPC · JPL |
| 413917 | 2006 WD_{103} | — | October 31, 2006 | Mount Lemmon | Mount Lemmon Survey | · | 2.0 km | MPC · JPL |
| 413918 | 2006 WA_{115} | — | November 20, 2006 | Catalina | CSS | NYS | 1.2 km | MPC · JPL |
| 413919 | 2006 WP_{126} | — | November 22, 2006 | Catalina | CSS | · | 2.6 km | MPC · JPL |
| 413920 | 2006 WD_{135} | — | November 18, 2006 | Kitt Peak | Spacewatch | (5) | 1.4 km | MPC · JPL |
| 413921 | 2006 WK_{151} | — | October 4, 2006 | Mount Lemmon | Mount Lemmon Survey | · | 1.1 km | MPC · JPL |
| 413922 | 2006 WC_{152} | — | November 21, 2006 | Mount Lemmon | Mount Lemmon Survey | 3:2 | 4.6 km | MPC · JPL |
| 413923 | 2006 WJ_{155} | — | November 22, 2006 | Kitt Peak | Spacewatch | · | 1.4 km | MPC · JPL |
| 413924 | 2006 WU_{166} | — | October 31, 2006 | Mount Lemmon | Mount Lemmon Survey | · | 1.6 km | MPC · JPL |
| 413925 | 2006 WJ_{171} | — | October 31, 2006 | Mount Lemmon | Mount Lemmon Survey | · | 1.8 km | MPC · JPL |
| 413926 | 2006 WU_{181} | — | November 11, 2006 | Mount Lemmon | Mount Lemmon Survey | · | 1.8 km | MPC · JPL |
| 413927 | 2006 WW_{192} | — | November 11, 2006 | Kitt Peak | Spacewatch | · | 1.1 km | MPC · JPL |
| 413928 | 2006 XV_{2} | — | November 23, 2006 | Kitt Peak | Spacewatch | EUN | 1.1 km | MPC · JPL |
| 413929 | 2006 XE_{10} | — | December 9, 2006 | Kitt Peak | Spacewatch | · | 1.6 km | MPC · JPL |
| 413930 | 2006 XW_{10} | — | December 9, 2006 | Kitt Peak | Spacewatch | · | 1.6 km | MPC · JPL |
| 413931 | 2006 XB_{16} | — | December 10, 2006 | Kitt Peak | Spacewatch | · | 1.0 km | MPC · JPL |
| 413932 | 2006 XL_{35} | — | December 1, 2006 | Mount Lemmon | Mount Lemmon Survey | EUN | 1.1 km | MPC · JPL |
| 413933 | 2006 XR_{38} | — | October 28, 2006 | Mount Lemmon | Mount Lemmon Survey | · | 1.3 km | MPC · JPL |
| 413934 | 2006 XD_{39} | — | December 1, 2006 | Mount Lemmon | Mount Lemmon Survey | · | 1.3 km | MPC · JPL |
| 413935 | 2006 XS_{49} | — | December 13, 2006 | Mount Lemmon | Mount Lemmon Survey | · | 2.2 km | MPC · JPL |
| 413936 | 2006 XO_{51} | — | November 21, 2006 | Catalina | CSS | H | 840 m | MPC · JPL |
| 413937 | 2006 XN_{70} | — | December 15, 2006 | Kitt Peak | Spacewatch | · | 2.0 km | MPC · JPL |
| 413938 | 2006 XS_{70} | — | December 13, 2006 | Mount Lemmon | Mount Lemmon Survey | · | 1.4 km | MPC · JPL |
| 413939 | 2006 YY_{6} | — | September 28, 2006 | Mount Lemmon | Mount Lemmon Survey | · | 1.4 km | MPC · JPL |
| 413940 | 2006 YA_{13} | — | December 25, 2006 | Desert Moon | Stevens, B. L. | · | 1.4 km | MPC · JPL |
| 413941 | 2006 YP_{19} | — | December 24, 2006 | Bergisch Gladbach | W. Bickel | (5) | 1.1 km | MPC · JPL |
| 413942 | 2006 YW_{21} | — | December 14, 2006 | Socorro | LINEAR | · | 1.5 km | MPC · JPL |
| 413943 | 2006 YD_{35} | — | December 21, 2006 | Kitt Peak | Spacewatch | · | 2.2 km | MPC · JPL |
| 413944 | 2006 YE_{46} | — | December 13, 2006 | Kitt Peak | Spacewatch | EUN | 1.3 km | MPC · JPL |
| 413945 | 2006 YG_{47} | — | December 22, 2006 | Socorro | LINEAR | · | 1.6 km | MPC · JPL |
| 413946 | 2006 YW_{48} | — | December 26, 2006 | Catalina | CSS | H | 820 m | MPC · JPL |
| 413947 | 2007 AD | — | December 24, 2006 | Kitt Peak | Spacewatch | · | 1.3 km | MPC · JPL |
| 413948 | 2007 AK_{7} | — | January 9, 2007 | Mount Lemmon | Mount Lemmon Survey | (5) | 1.2 km | MPC · JPL |
| 413949 | 2007 AH_{14} | — | November 15, 2006 | Mount Lemmon | Mount Lemmon Survey | · | 1.4 km | MPC · JPL |
| 413950 | 2007 AS_{29} | — | January 9, 2007 | Mount Lemmon | Mount Lemmon Survey | HOF | 2.6 km | MPC · JPL |
| 413951 | 2007 BF_{12} | — | January 17, 2007 | Kitt Peak | Spacewatch | · | 2.1 km | MPC · JPL |
| 413952 | 2007 BP_{14} | — | March 9, 2003 | Kitt Peak | Spacewatch | · | 1.1 km | MPC · JPL |
| 413953 | 2007 BP_{40} | — | January 24, 2007 | Mount Lemmon | Mount Lemmon Survey | · | 2.1 km | MPC · JPL |
| 413954 | 2007 BF_{43} | — | January 24, 2007 | Mount Lemmon | Mount Lemmon Survey | · | 1.4 km | MPC · JPL |
| 413955 | 2007 BZ_{45} | — | January 26, 2007 | Anderson Mesa | LONEOS | · | 2.8 km | MPC · JPL |
| 413956 | 2007 BA_{47} | — | January 26, 2007 | Kitt Peak | Spacewatch | · | 1.5 km | MPC · JPL |
| 413957 | 2007 BJ_{50} | — | November 21, 2006 | Mount Lemmon | Mount Lemmon Survey | · | 2.3 km | MPC · JPL |
| 413958 | 2007 BM_{97} | — | January 19, 2007 | Mauna Kea | Mauna Kea | MIS | 2.3 km | MPC · JPL |
| 413959 | 2007 BS_{101} | — | January 25, 2007 | Catalina | CSS | · | 1.5 km | MPC · JPL |
| 413960 | 2007 BB_{102} | — | January 28, 2007 | Catalina | CSS | · | 2.6 km | MPC · JPL |
| 413961 | 2007 CU | — | February 6, 2007 | Mount Lemmon | Mount Lemmon Survey | · | 1.4 km | MPC · JPL |
| 413962 | 2007 CP_{21} | — | February 6, 2007 | Palomar | NEAT | EUN | 1.8 km | MPC · JPL |
| 413963 | 2007 CL_{27} | — | February 5, 2007 | Palomar | NEAT | EUN | 1.4 km | MPC · JPL |
| 413964 | 2007 CB_{29} | — | November 22, 2006 | Mount Lemmon | Mount Lemmon Survey | · | 1.6 km | MPC · JPL |
| 413965 | 2007 CG_{30} | — | February 6, 2007 | Mount Lemmon | Mount Lemmon Survey | HOF | 2.6 km | MPC · JPL |
| 413966 | 2007 CC_{32} | — | February 6, 2007 | Mount Lemmon | Mount Lemmon Survey | · | 2.0 km | MPC · JPL |
| 413967 | 2007 CM_{38} | — | February 6, 2007 | Mount Lemmon | Mount Lemmon Survey | · | 1.4 km | MPC · JPL |
| 413968 | 2007 CM_{40} | — | February 7, 2007 | Palomar | NEAT | · | 1.3 km | MPC · JPL |
| 413969 | 2007 DN_{7} | — | February 19, 2007 | Bisei SG Center | BATTeRS | · | 1.8 km | MPC · JPL |
| 413970 | 2007 DM_{19} | — | February 17, 2007 | Kitt Peak | Spacewatch | · | 2.0 km | MPC · JPL |
| 413971 | 2007 DP_{23} | — | February 17, 2007 | Kitt Peak | Spacewatch | · | 1.4 km | MPC · JPL |
| 413972 | 2007 DB_{28} | — | February 17, 2007 | Kitt Peak | Spacewatch | · | 1.7 km | MPC · JPL |
| 413973 | 2007 DR_{29} | — | February 17, 2007 | Kitt Peak | Spacewatch | · | 2.4 km | MPC · JPL |
| 413974 | 2007 DX_{42} | — | December 24, 2006 | Mount Lemmon | Mount Lemmon Survey | DOR | 3.0 km | MPC · JPL |
| 413975 | 2007 DL_{54} | — | February 21, 2007 | Kitt Peak | Spacewatch | · | 2.0 km | MPC · JPL |
| 413976 | 2007 DQ_{58} | — | February 21, 2007 | Mount Lemmon | Mount Lemmon Survey | · | 1.6 km | MPC · JPL |
| 413977 | 2007 DV_{58} | — | February 21, 2007 | Mount Lemmon | Mount Lemmon Survey | · | 1.6 km | MPC · JPL |
| 413978 | 2007 DH_{74} | — | February 21, 2007 | Mount Lemmon | Mount Lemmon Survey | · | 1.8 km | MPC · JPL |
| 413979 | 2007 DX_{98} | — | January 27, 2007 | Mount Lemmon | Mount Lemmon Survey | · | 2.1 km | MPC · JPL |
| 413980 | 2007 DK_{109} | — | February 16, 2007 | Mount Lemmon | Mount Lemmon Survey | · | 1.5 km | MPC · JPL |
| 413981 | 2007 DG_{116} | — | February 16, 2007 | Catalina | CSS | · | 2.8 km | MPC · JPL |
| 413982 | 2007 EV_{14} | — | March 9, 2007 | Mount Lemmon | Mount Lemmon Survey | · | 2.0 km | MPC · JPL |
| 413983 | 2007 EA_{28} | — | January 25, 2007 | Kitt Peak | Spacewatch | · | 1.6 km | MPC · JPL |
| 413984 | 2007 ES_{30} | — | November 23, 2006 | Mount Lemmon | Mount Lemmon Survey | · | 1.2 km | MPC · JPL |
| 413985 | 2007 ED_{44} | — | March 9, 2007 | Kitt Peak | Spacewatch | AGN | 1.3 km | MPC · JPL |
| 413986 | 2007 EY_{57} | — | March 9, 2007 | Palomar | NEAT | · | 2.1 km | MPC · JPL |
| 413987 | 2007 EZ_{75} | — | March 10, 2007 | Kitt Peak | Spacewatch | · | 1.3 km | MPC · JPL |
| 413988 | 2007 EV_{76} | — | March 10, 2007 | Kitt Peak | Spacewatch | · | 1.8 km | MPC · JPL |
| 413989 | 2007 EL_{88} | — | March 14, 2007 | Siding Spring | SSS | APO · PHA | 550 m | MPC · JPL |
| 413990 | 2007 EZ_{107} | — | March 11, 2007 | Kitt Peak | Spacewatch | · | 2.7 km | MPC · JPL |
| 413991 | 2007 EW_{108} | — | March 11, 2007 | Kitt Peak | Spacewatch | · | 2.0 km | MPC · JPL |
| 413992 | 2007 EH_{114} | — | March 12, 2007 | Mount Lemmon | Mount Lemmon Survey | EUP | 4.8 km | MPC · JPL |
| 413993 | 2007 EC_{125} | — | March 13, 2007 | Gnosca | S. Sposetti | · | 2.1 km | MPC · JPL |
| 413994 | 2007 EE_{150} | — | March 12, 2007 | Mount Lemmon | Mount Lemmon Survey | · | 1.7 km | MPC · JPL |
| 413995 | 2007 EW_{157} | — | March 13, 2007 | Mount Lemmon | Mount Lemmon Survey | · | 1.4 km | MPC · JPL |
| 413996 | 2007 EA_{158} | — | March 13, 2007 | Mount Lemmon | Mount Lemmon Survey | KOR | 1.1 km | MPC · JPL |
| 413997 | 2007 EJ_{168} | — | March 13, 2007 | Kitt Peak | Spacewatch | THM | 2.3 km | MPC · JPL |
| 413998 | 2007 EU_{222} | — | August 30, 2000 | Kitt Peak | Spacewatch | · | 2.2 km | MPC · JPL |
| 413999 | 2007 ED_{224} | — | March 15, 2007 | Kitt Peak | Spacewatch | BRA | 1.4 km | MPC · JPL |
| 414000 | 2007 FU_{6} | — | February 21, 2007 | Kitt Peak | Spacewatch | HOF | 2.6 km | MPC · JPL |

back to top

== Meaning of names ==
As minor planet discoveries are confirmed, they are given a permanent number by the IAU's Minor Planet Center (MPC), and the discoverers can then submit names for them, following the IAU's naming conventions. The list below concerns those minor planets in the specified number-range that have received names, and explains the meanings of those names.

Official naming citations of newly named small Solar System bodies are approved and published in a bulletin by IAU's Working Group for Small Bodies Nomenclature (WGSBN). Before May 2021, citations were published in MPC's Minor Planet Circulars for many decades. Recent citations can also be found on the JPL Small-Body Database (SBDB). Until his death in 2016, German astronomer Lutz D. Schmadel compiled these citations into the Dictionary of Minor Planet Names (DMP) and regularly updated the collection.

Based on Paul Herget's The Names of the Minor Planets, Schmadel also researched the unclear origin of numerous asteroids, most of which had been named prior to World War II. This article incorporates text from this source, which is in the public domain: SBDB New namings may only be added to this list below after official publication as the preannouncement of names is condemned. The WGSBN publishes a comprehensive guideline for the naming rules of non-cometary small Solar System bodies.

| Named minor planet | Provisional | This minor planet was named for... | Ref · Catalog |
|---|---|---|---|
| 413033 Aerts | 2000 XU_{53} | Conny Aerts (born 1966) is a Belgian astrophysicist and Professor at the Katholieke Universiteit Leuven, known for her work in asteroseismology and for her efforts in encouraging women to choose science as a career. She received the Francqui Prize in 2012. | JPL · 413033 |
| 413233 Várkonyiágnes | 2003 SB_{129} | Ágnes R. Várkonyi (1928–2014) was a Hungarian historian, cultural historian, and full member of the Hungarian Academy of Sciences. Her main field of research was the Rákóczi War of Independence, the Zrínyi Movement, and the Habsburg system. She was the winner of the 1999 annual science communication award. | IAU · 413233 |
