= Nikolaos Kylafis =

Greek university professor (born 1949)

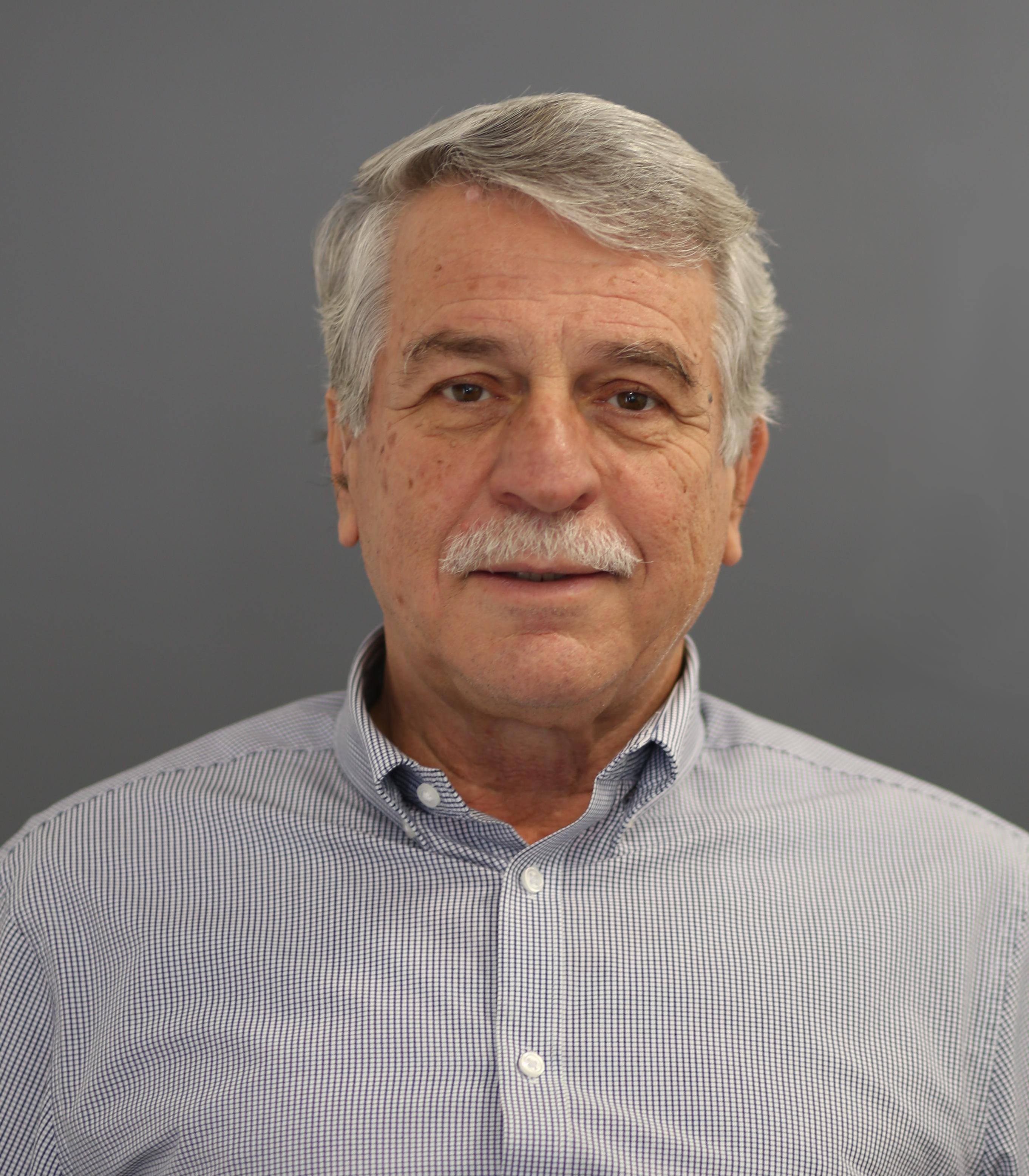
- Kylafis in 2019
- Born: 1 January 1949 (age 77); Nea Avorani, Greece
- Known for: Goldreich-Kylafis effect
- Scientific career
- Institutions: University of Patras; University of Illinois Urbana-Champaign; Caltech; Institute for Advanced Study; Columbia University; University of Crete
- Doctoral advisor: Donald Q. Lamb

Nikolaos Kylafis (Greek: Νικόλαος Κυλάφης) is a Greek Theoretical Astrophysicist, who is professor emeritus at the Department of Physics of the University of Crete, Greece.

Kylafis contributed to the founding of the Astrophysics Group of the University of Crete and the Foundation for Research & Technology - Helas (FORTH) in 1985 and led, together with his colleague Ioannis Papamastorakis, the effort to create the Institute of Astrophysics at FORTH in 2018. He has been teaching undergraduate and graduate courses in the Department of Physics since 1985. He has published research works in refereed journals.

== Education ==
Nikolaos (Nick) Kylafis was born in Nea Avorani, Greece, on 1 January 1949, where he grew up. In 1966 he was admitted at the Department of Physics of the University of Patras and graduated in 1971. The next year he started his graduate studies in the US at the University of Illinois from where he received his master's degree in 1973 and PhD in 1978. His PhD dissertation was entitled "X and UV radiation from accreting non-magnetic degenerate dwarfs" and it was completed under the supervision of Donald Q. Lamb.

== Academic career ==
After a short break to complete his compulsory military service in Greece, Kylafis continued his academic career as a postdoctoral fellow at Caltech (1979-1981), where he collaborated with Peter Goldreich and contributed to the discovery of the so-called Goldreich-Kylafis effect. He then moved as a member to the Institute for Advanced Study at Princeton (1981-1984), where he collaborated with John N. Bahcall on topics related to radiative transfer in dusty disk galaxies. He worked for a year as an assistant professor at Columbia University in New York City, before returning as a faculty member at the Department of Physics of the University of Crete. He was promoted to full professor in 1997 and served as chairman of the department as well as dean of the School of Natural Sciences. He retired in 2016 and became emeritus professor. In 2018, he was elected to the Council of the European Astronomical Society, where he is currently serving as treasurer. In 2019, he was awarded the outstanding teaching prize "Stelios Pichorides" by the University of Crete.

== Academic recognition ==
In 2019, on the occasion of his 70th birthday, the Institute of Astrophysics of FORTH founded the "Nick Kylafis Lectureship" in recognition of his 35 years of scientific and administrative leadership, which contributed to the creation of the Institute of Astrophysics in 2018. Under the auspices of the Lectureship, one distinguished Theoretical Astrophysicist is invited annually at FORTH for a brief visit.

The scientists who have been awarded the Lectureship are:

- 2019, Rashid Sunyaev, Director Emeritus at the Max Planck Institute for Astrophysics, Germany
- 2020, Joseph Silk, Professor Emeritus at University of Oxford, UK
- 2021, Ewine van Dishoeck, Professor at Leiden University, The Netherlands
- 2022, Françoise Combes, Chair of Galaxies and Cosmology at Collège de France and Astronomer, Classe Exceptionnelle, at Observatoire de Paris, France
- 2023, Steven Balbus, Savilian Professor of Astronomy at the University of Oxford, UK
- 2024, David Spergel, President Simons Foundation and C.A. Young Professor of Astronomy Emeritus, Princeton University, USA
- 2025, Roger Blandford, Luke Blossom Professor at Stanford University, USA

== Scientific contributions ==
Kylafis has contributed to topics related to the production and transfer of radiation in spiral galaxies, in accretion disks around neutron stars and black holes, as well as in astrophysical MASERs. His most known work is the Goldreich-Kylafis effect, which predicts that, under special conditions, the spectral lines emitted by interstellar molecules should be linearly polarized and the linear polarization vector should reveal the magnetic field direction in the molecular cloud. Other discoveries include the empirical explanation of the physical mechanisms that take place during the accretion and ejection of mass from binary systems which include a black hole and the proof that the different physical processes that take place in these systems are correlated.
