= Annual Review of Astronomy and Astrophysics =

- Discipline: Astronomy
- Language: English
- Edited by: Conny Aerts; Robert C. Kennicutt

Publication details
- History: 1963–present, 63 years old
- Publisher: Annual Reviews (US)
- Frequency: Annually
- Open access: Subscribe to Open
- Impact factor: 37.3 (2025)

Standard abbreviations
- ISO 4: Annu. Rev. Astron. Astrophys.

Indexing
- CODEN: ARAAAJ
- ISSN: 0066-4146 (print); 1545-4282 (web)
- LCCN: 63008846
- OCLC no.: 1481495

Links
- Journal homepage

The Annual Review of Astronomy and Astrophysics is an annual peer-reviewed scientific journal published by Annual Reviews (AR). The co-editors are Conny Aerts and Robert C. Kennicutt. The journal reviews scientific literature pertaining to local and distant celestial entities throughout the observable universe, as well as cosmology, instrumentation, techniques, and the history of developments. It was established in 1963. As of 2023, it is being published as open access, under the Subscribe to Open model. As of 2026, Journal Citation Reports gives the journal an impact factor of 37.3, ranking it first out of 86 journals in the category "Astronomy and Astrophysics".

== History ==
Annual Reviews (AR) is a nonprofit organization whose stated mission is to synthesize knowledge "for the progress of science and the benefit of society." In November 1960, the board of directors of AR began investigating the need for a new journal of review articles that covered developments in astronomy and astrophysics. The board consulted an advisory group of experts, including Ronald Bracewell, Robert Jastrow, Joseph Kaplan, Paul Merrill, Otto Struve, and Harold Urey. The editorial committee met in August 1961 to determine the authors and topics for the first volume, which was published in 1963. As of 2020, it was published both in print and electronically.

== Scope and indexing ==
The Annual Review of Astronomy and Astrophysics defines its scope as covering significant developments in astronomy and astrophysics, including the Sun, the Solar System, exoplanets, stars, the interstellar medium, the Milky Way and other galaxies, galactic nuclei, cosmology, and the instrumentation and techniques used for research and analysis. As of 2026, Journal Citation Reports gives the journal an impact factor of 37.3, ranking it first out of 86 journals in the category "Astronomy and Astrophysics". It is abstracted and indexed in Scopus, Science Citation Index Expanded, Civil Engineering Abstracts, Inspec, and Academic Search, among others.

== Editorial processes ==
The Annual Review of Astronomy and Astrophysics is led by the editor or co-editors. They are assisted by the editorial committee, which includes associate editors, regular members, and occasionally guest editors. Guest members participate at the invitation of the editor, and serve terms of one year. All other members of the editorial committee are appointed by the AR board of directors and serve five-year terms. The editorial committee determines which topics should be included in each volume and solicits reviews from qualified authors. Unsolicited manuscripts are not accepted. Peer review of accepted manuscripts is undertaken by the editorial committee.

=== Editors of volumes ===
Dates indicate publication years in which someone was credited as a lead editor or co-editor of a journal volume. The planning process for a volume begins well before the volume appears, so appointment to the position of lead editor generally occurred prior to the first year shown here. An editor who has retired or died may be credited as a lead editor of a volume that they helped to plan, even if it is published after their retirement or death.

- Leo Goldberg (1963–1973)
- Geoffrey Burbidge (1974–2004)
- Roger Blandford (2005–2011)
- Ewine van Dishoeck and Sandra Faber (2012–2021)
- Ewine van Dishoeck and Robert C. Kennicutt (2022-2026)
- Conny Aerts and Robert C. Kennicutt (2026–present)

=== Current editorial committee ===
As of 2026, the editorial committee consists of the co-editors and the following members:

- Xiaohui Fan
- Sarah Gibson
- Mark R. Krumholz
- Yuri Levin
- Hans-Walter Rix

Previous members (as of 2022) include: Joss Bland-Hawthorn and Eliot Quataert.

== See also ==
- List of astronomy journals
