= Bruce Peterson (astronomer) =

American astronomer (born 1941)

Bruce Alrick Peterson is a cosmologist based at Mount Stromlo Observatory of the Australian National University. Peterson and James Gunn predicted the Gunn–Peterson trough, the absorption effect of neutral hydrogen on the spectra of quasars. His research includes studies of quasars, dark matter and the large-scale structure of the universe.

== Childhood and education ==
Peterson was born in 1941 in the United States. He was an undergraduate at Massachusetts Institute of Technology and obtained his PhD, "A study of absorption and reddening using absolute magnitudes and colors of galaxies", in 1969 under the supervision of Maarten Schmidt at Caltech.

== Cosmologist ==
Prior to obtaining his PhD, Peterson and James Gunn argued in 1965 that if the universe had a high enough density of neutral hydrogen atoms near a quasar, then almost all photons emitted by the quasar that are more energetic than the Lyman-alpha wavelength of 1216 angstroms should be absorbed by the neutral hydrogen. The effect, called the Gunn–Peterson trough, should yield zero emission at wavelengths shorter than 1216 angstroms (after shifting for redshift) in the observed spectrum of the quasar. The effect was detected in 2001 in a quasar at a redshift of 6.28.

Peterson obtained a research position at Mount Stromlo Observatory at the Australian National University in Australia, where he continued research into quasars and the Stromlo-APM redshift survey. He played a major role in the MACHO Project that was conducted on a Mount Stromlo telescope to look for massive compact halo objects, a possible candidate for dark matter. Peterson was active in the 2dF Galaxy Redshift Survey, in identifications of gamma-ray bursts and in searches for high-redshift quasars.

== Awards ==
In 2004, Peterson received a Thomson ISI Citation Laureate for his "outstanding contribution to Space Sciences in Australia". He had the highest number of citations among Australian astronomers for the period from 1980 to 2004: 176 papers cited 11039 times, according to Thomson ISI.
