= Norman Murray (astronomer) =

American theoretical astrophysicist

- Born: Los Angeles, California
- Awards: Dannie Heineman Prize for Astrophysics

Academic background
- Education: BSc, 1979, California Institute of Technology; PhD, 1986, University of California, Berkeley
- Thesis: Diffusion in Hamiltonian Systems with Applications to Twist Maps and the Two Beam Accelerator (1986)

Academic work
- Institutions: University of Toronto; Canadian Institute for Theoretical Astrophysics; California Institute of Technology
- Website: www.cita.utoronto.ca/~murray/

Norman William Murray FRSC is an American theoretical astrophysicist. He is a Professor of Astronomy and Astrophysics at the University of Toronto and former director of the Canadian Institute for Theoretical Astrophysics. Murray is a Fellow of the American Academy of Arts and Sciences, American Astronomical Society, National Academy of Sciences, Royal Society of Canada, and American Physical Society.

== Early life and education ==
Murray was born in Los Angeles, California. He earned his Bachelor of Science degree from the California Institute of Technology (Caltech) and his PhD from the University of California, Berkeley. He began focusing on nonlinear dynamics during his graduate studies and continued in that field as postdoctoral researcher at Queen Mary University of London. After reaching out to astronomer Peter Goldreich, Murray was offered a second postdoctoral position at Caltech. In this role, he helped Goldreich develop a theory on how solar p-mode oscillation frequencies vary in response to changes in the Sun's internal entropy and magnetic fields.

== Career ==
Murray left California in 1993 to accept a faculty position at the Canadian Institute for Theoretical Astrophysics (CITA), which was based out of the University of Toronto (U of T). His early research at CITA focused on understanding how the intense light of a quasar, an extremely luminous active galactic nucleus, drives winds. This later developed into investigating how the radiation from star formation or active galactic nuclei can regulate the growth and luminosity of galaxies through momentum-driven winds. His early career research earned him the 1999 Newcomb Cleveland Award and a 2000 Province of Ontario Premier's Research Excellence Award. He was also appointed a Tier 1 Canada Research Chair in Theoretical Astrophysics at U of T.

In 2006, Murray was appointed Director of CITA. He was also elected a Fellow of the American Physical Society for his "fundamental contributions to the theory of active galactic nuclei, black hole and star formation in galactic disks, planet formation, and the dynamics of planetary systems." While serving as director of CITA, Murray renewed his Canada Research Chair at U of T in 2008 and 2014. Throughout his tenure at U of T and CITA, Murray shifted his focus to black holes, protoplanetary disks, and Earth's thermal tides. After stepping down as director in 2016, Murray was elected a Fellow of the American Association for the Advancement of Science and Royal Society of Canada for his advanced research on astronomical problems. In 2022, he received the Dannie Heineman Prize for Astrophysics.

In 2025, Murray was elected a Fellow of the American Academy of Arts and Sciences and American Astronomical Society. He was also one of 30 international researchers appointed a Member of the National Academy of Sciences.
