= Gillian R. Knapp =

American astronomer

- Born: United Kingdom
- Education: University of Maryland; University of Edinburgh
- Scientific career
- Fields: Astronomy
- Workplaces: Princeton University; California Institute of Technology

Gillian Knapp is a professor of astronomical sciences at Princeton University. She is a faculty fellow at Whitman College. She has been involved in the Sloan Digital Sky Survey and she is an active member of the International Astronomical Union.

== Education ==
Gillian Knapp attended the University of Edinburgh and received her B.Sc. in physics in 1966. Following her interest in astronomy, she moved to the US to continue her study in the University of Maryland where she got Ph.D. in astronomy in 1971. After a short period of teaching in Maryland, Knapp moved to the West coast in 1974 and continued her scientific career as a research fellow in the California Institute of technology.

== Scientific career ==
In the California Institute of technology, Gillian Knapp was promoted to a senior research fellow in 1976 and became a staff member of the Owens Valley Radio Observatory the same year.

In 1980 Knapp moved to Princeton to work as a researcher in the Department of Astrophysical Sciences of Princeton University and became an associate professor in 1984. In the 1980s and early 1990s, Dr. Knapp conducted pioneering studies using radio telescopes to study the mass loss that occurs near the end of the life of Asymptotic Giant Branch stars and related objects. Starting 1990, she worked on the construction of the Sloan Digital Sky Survey, and her contribution included the discovery and characterization of brown dwarfs, white dwarf stars and high-velocity stars. Her scientific career was successfully developed over the years in Princeton University, where she received an Emerita Professor status in 2014.

Gillian Knapp is a highly cited astronomer and a member of American Astronomical Society, Royal Astronomical Society, International Union of Radio Science, International Astronomical Union.

== Honors and awards ==
In 1983 the University of Texas at Austin established the Beatrice Tinsley Centennial Visiting Professorship in Astronomy. Gillian Knapp was the first recipient of the professorship (Fall 1985).

Knapp was honored with the Distinguished Alumnus Award of the University of Maryland in 2003.

Knapp received the Presidential Award for Excellence in Science, Mathematics and Engineering Mentoring in 2018, for her work bringing college level course material to prison inmates as part of the Prison Teaching Initiative, which she co-founded in 2005 along with other Princeton astrophysicists Mark Krumholz and Jenny Greene.

== Personal life ==
She is married to astronomer James Gunn. They have two children, a son and a daughter, adopted from Peru in 1991.
