= Enrico Fermi Institute =

Physics research institute of the University of Chicago

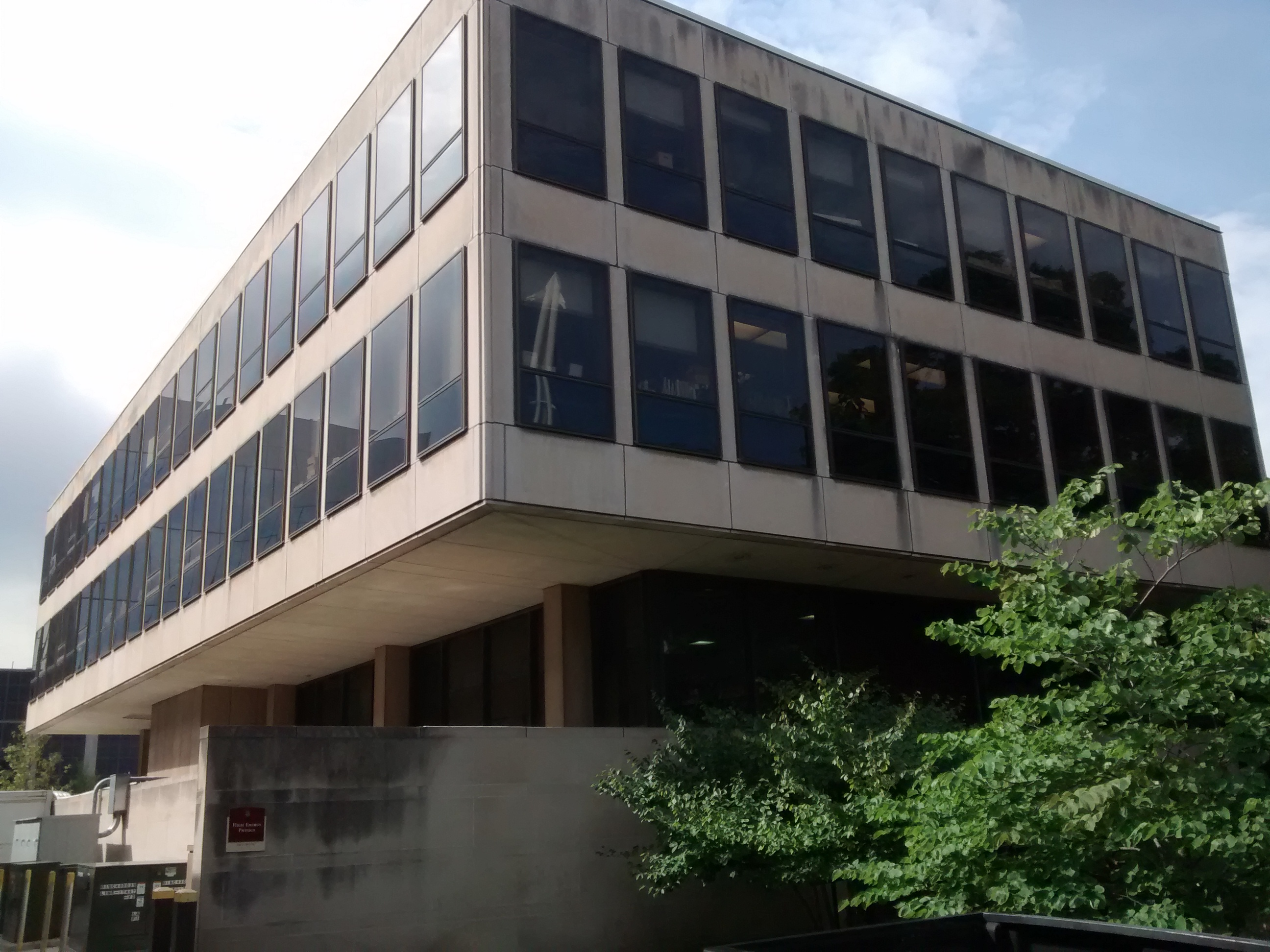
- Established: 1945
- Field of research: Astrophysics; Cosmochemistry; Particle physics Relativity
- Director: Edward Blucher
- Location: Chicago, Illinois, United States; 41.7929°N 87.6026°W
- Operating agency: University of Chicago
- Nobel laureates: James Cronin; Enrico Fermi; Willard Libby; Maria Goeppert Mayer; Yoichiro Nambu; Harold Urey
- Website: efi.uchicago.edu

The Enrico Fermi Institute is a physics research institute of the University of Chicago. It was founded in September 1945 with Samuel King Allison as director. On November 20, 1955, it was renamed The Enrico Fermi Institute for Nuclear Studies. The name was shortened to The Enrico Fermi Institute (EFI) in January 1968.

Physicist Enrico Fermi was heavily involved in the founding years of the institute, and it was at his request that Allison took the position as the first director. In addition to Fermi and Allison, the initial faculty included Harold C. Urey, Edward Teller, Joseph E. Mayer, and Maria Goeppert Mayer.

== Research activities ==
- Theoretical and experimental particle physics;
- Theoretical and experimental astrophysics and cosmology;
- General relativity;
- Electron microscopy;
- Ion microscopy and secondary ion mass spectrometry;
- Nonimaging optics and solar energy concentration;
- Geochemistry, cosmochemistry and nuclear chemistry.

== Notable staff ==
- Herbert L. Anderson, nuclear physicist
- James Cronin, Nobel laureate in physics
- Enrico Fermi, Nobel laureate in physics
- Riazuddin, nuclear physicist
- Robert Geroch, general relativist
- James Hartle, general relativist
- Craig Hogan, astronomer
- Faheem Hussain, string theorist
- Leo Kadanoff, condensed matter physicist
- Edward Kolb, cosmologist
- Willard Libby, chemist
- Emil Martinec, string theorist
- Joseph E. Mayer, chemist
- Maria Goeppert Mayer, Nobel laureate in physics
- Yoichiro Nambu, Nobel laureate in physics
- Marcel Schein, cosmic ray physicist
- Eugene Parker, solar and plasma physicist
- John Alexander Simpson, nuclear and cosmic ray physicist
- Edward Teller, nuclear physicist, father of the hydrogen bomb
- Michael Turner, cosmologist
- Harold C. Urey, Nobel laureate in chemistry
- Carlos E.M. Wagner, particle phenomenologist
- Robert M. Wald, general relativist
- Gregor Wentzel, quantum physicist

== See also ==
- Fermilab
- Particle physics
- James Franck Institute
