= Suyu =

Suyu may refer to:

- Suyu (Inca Empire), region or province of the Inca Empire
- Suyu District, in Suqian, Jiangsu, China
- Suyu-dong, a dong, neighbourhood of Gangbuk-gu in Seoul, South Korea
- Suyu Station, on the Seoul Subway Line 4, South Korea
- Suyu, a fork of the defunct Yuzu emulator
- Sherry Suyu, Canadian observational cosmologist

== See also ==
- Su Yu (1907–1984), Chinese general
