= IAYC =

IAYC may refer to:

- I am your child, parents group (now called Parents for Children)
- I Am Your Conscience, band
- "I Am Your Conscience", song by Leæther Strip, a Danish musical project
- "I Am Your Conscience", song by Cherryholmes, an American bluegrass band
- International Association of Yiddish Clubs
- International Astronomical Youth Camp, an annual summer camp for young people
