= Conny Aerts =

Belgian astronomer and astrophysicist

Conny Clara Aerts
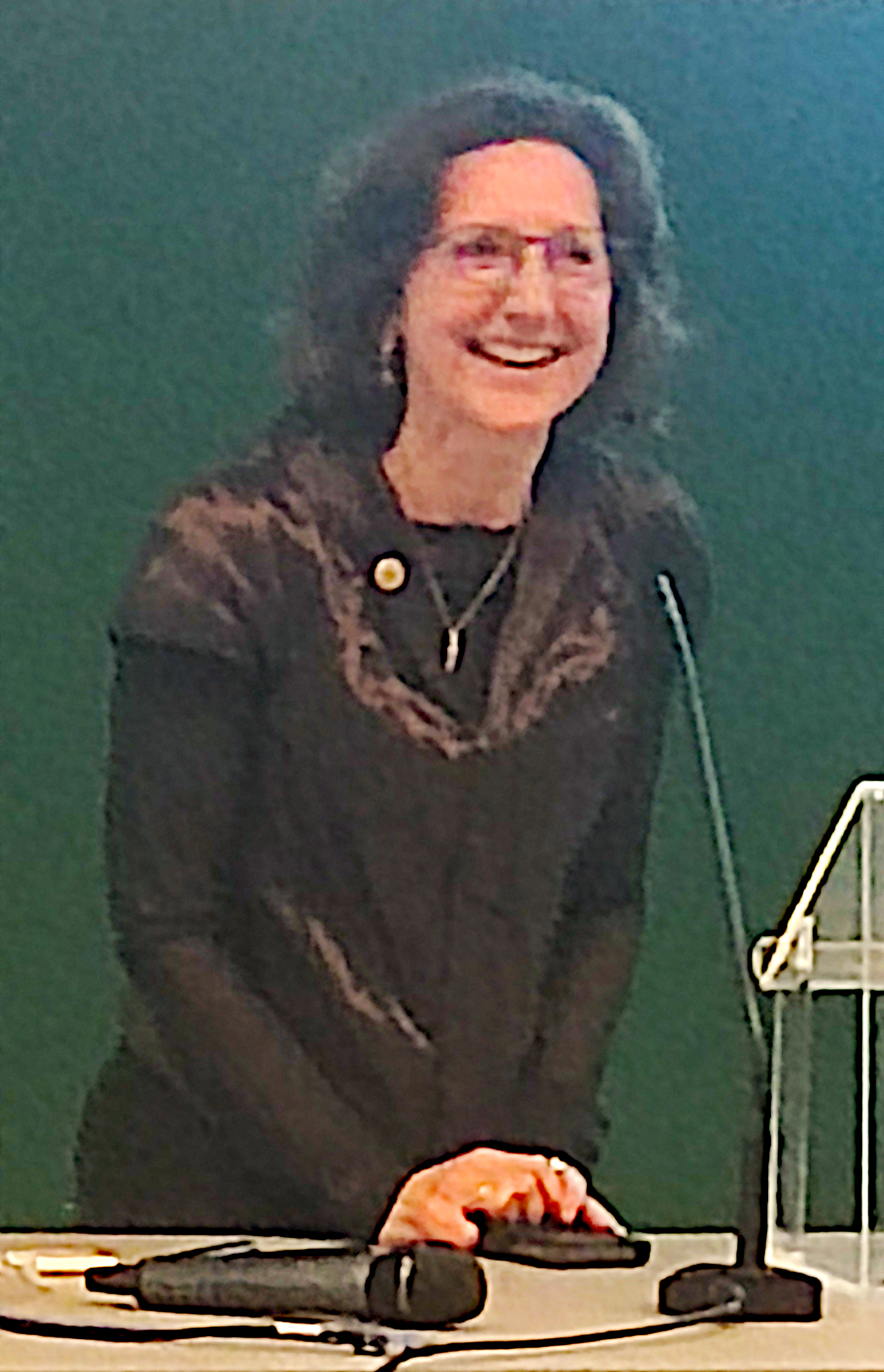
- Aerts presenting in 2023
- Born: 26 January 1966 (age 60); Brasschaat
- Awards: Francqui Prize; Kavli Prize; Crafoord Prize

Academic background
- Education: University of Antwerp
- Alma mater: KU Leuven

Academic work
- Discipline: Astrophysics
- Sub-discipline: Astroseismology
- Institutions: KU Leuven; Radboud University

Conny Clara Aerts, born 26 January 1966, is a Belgian (Flemish) professor in astrophysics. She specialises in asteroseismology. She is associated with KU Leuven and Radboud University, where she leads the Chair in the Astroseismology group. In 2012, she became the first woman to be awarded the Francqui Prize in the category of Science & Technology. In 2022, she became the third woman to be awarded the Kavli Prize in Astrophysics for her work in asteroseismology.

== Biography ==
Aerts was born in Brasschaat, Belgium. She received her Bachelor and Master in Mathematics from the University of Antwerp. She participated in the International Astronomical Youth Camp in 1987 and 1988. She then went on to complete her PhD in 1993 at KU Leuven. After completing she spent several months doing research at the University of Delaware. She was a postdoctoral fellow with the Fund for Scientific Research from 1993 to 2001, when she was appointed lecturer at KU Leuven. She became first associate professor in 2004, and then full professor in 2007 at KU Leuven.

== Research ==
In her research, she uses the star oscillations to determine the internal rotation profile of stars. The oscillations are obtained from both ground and space-based telescopes. In her PROSPERITY project, she used data obtained from the CoRoT satellite and the NASA Kepler satellite. She is currently the Belgian principal investigator on the PLATO mission.

Aerts developed methodology using Gaussian mixture classification to analyse the data. She uses this to determine the star structure and inform stellar models within stellar evolution theory. With these techniques she has made a number of discoveries, including that of non-rigid rotation in giant stars.

The theoretical models she develops based on the star oscillations also allow her determine the age of stars with a high accuracy.

Aerts has twice been awarded an Advanced Grant by the European Research Council (ERC): in 2008 for PROSPERITY, and again in 2015 for a project entitled MAMSIE (Mixing and Angular Momentum Transport of Massive Stars).

== Outreach ==
Aerts is Vice-Dean of Communication & Outreach at the Faculty of Science at KU Leuven. She is outspoken about the need to increase gender equality in the sciences, and is a member of the International Astronomical Union Women in Astronomy Working Group. As of 2026, Aerts became a co-editor of the Annual Review of Astronomy and Astrophysics.

== Prizes and recognition ==
- In 2010 she was elected Honorary Fellow of the Royal Astronomical Society.
- In 2011 she was elected Member of the Royal Flemish Academy for Sciences and Arts.
- In 2012 she won the Francqui prize.
- In 2016 she received the title of Commander of the Order of Leopold.
- In 2017 she was awarded the Hintze Lecture at Oxford University, delivering also a public lecture entitled "Starquakes expose stellar heartbeats".
- In 2018 she was awarded the ESA Lodewijk Woltjer Lecture for her work in the field of asteroseismology.
- In 2019, asteroid 413033 Aerts was named in her honor. The official naming citation was published by the Minor Planet Center on 18 May 2019 (M.P.C. 114955).
- In 2020 she was awarded the Research Foundation – Flanders (FWO) Excellence Prize in Exact Sciences.
- In 2022 she was awarded the Kavli Prize in Astrophysics.
- In 2024 she received the Crafoord Prize in Astronomy.
