= CMBFAST =

Computer code

In physical cosmology, CMBFAST is a computer code, written by Uroš Seljak and Matias Zaldarriaga, for computing the anisotropy of the cosmic microwave background. It was the first efficient program to do so, reducing the time taken to compute the anisotropy from several days to a few minutes by using a novel semi-analytic line-of-sight approach.
