= Adrienne Erickcek =

American theoretical cosmologist

Adrienne Lynn Erickcek is an American theoretical cosmologist whose research aims at understanding cosmic inflation, dark matter, dark energy and chameleon particles, and alternatives to general relativity such as f(R) gravity. She is an associate professor in the Department of Physics and Astronomy at the University of North Carolina at Chapel Hill.

== Education and career ==
Erickcek became interested in astrophysics very early in her life. She attended high school at Loy Norrix High School and the Kalamazoo Area Math and Science Center in Kalamazoo, Michigan. In 2013 she called out Kalamazoo physics teacher Michael Sinclair as particularly inspirational for her.

Erickcek majored in physics at Princeton University, graduating summa cum laude in 2003. After a year in England studying for the Mathematical Tripos (master of advanced study) in Churchill College, Cambridge, supported by a Churchill Scholarship, she entered the doctoral program in physics at the California Institute of Technology. She completed her Ph.D. there in 2009, with the dissertation The Consequences of Modifying Fundamental Cosmological Theories supervised by Marc Kamionkowski.

She became a postdoctoral researcher in Canada at the Canadian Institute for Theoretical Astrophysics in Toronto and the Perimeter Institute for Theoretical Physics in Waterloo, Ontario. Next, she took an assistant professorship at the University of North Carolina in 2013. She was promoted to associate professor in 2019.

== Recognition ==
Erickcek was named a Fellow of the American Physical Society (APS) in 2023, after a nomination from the APS Division of Astrophysics, "for theoretical contributions spanning cosmology, including inflation, cosmic acceleration, and dark matter, with a key focus on understanding primordial density perturbations on small distance scales".

== Personal life ==
Erickcek is married to Nicholas M. Law, an observational astronomer at the University of North Carolina.

== Selected publications ==
- Takeshi Chiba; Tristan L. Smith; Adrienne L. Erickcek (June 20, 2007). "Solar System constraints to general f ( R ) gravity". Physical Review D. 75 (12). Bibcode:2007PhRvD..75l4014C. doi:10.1103/PHYSREVD.75.124014. ISSN 1550-7998. Wikidata Q134419301.
- Jens Chluba; Adrienne L. Erickcek; Ido Ben-Dayan (2012). "Probing the inflaton: small-scale power spectrum constraints from measurements of the cosmic microwave background energy spectrum". The Astrophysical Journal. 758 (2): 76. arXiv:1203.2681. Bibcode:2012ApJ...758...76C. doi:10.1088/0004-637X/758/2/76. ISSN 0004-637X. Wikidata Q69038266.
- Adrienne L. Erickcek; Tristan L. Smith; Marc Kamionkowski (December 15, 2006). "Solar system testsdorule out1/Rgravity". Physical Review D. 74 (12). arXiv:astro-ph/0610483. Bibcode:2006PhRvD..74l1501E. doi:10.1103/PHYSREVD.74.121501. ISSN 1550-7998. Wikidata Q59769521.
