= Susan E. Clark =

American astrophysicist

Susan Clark
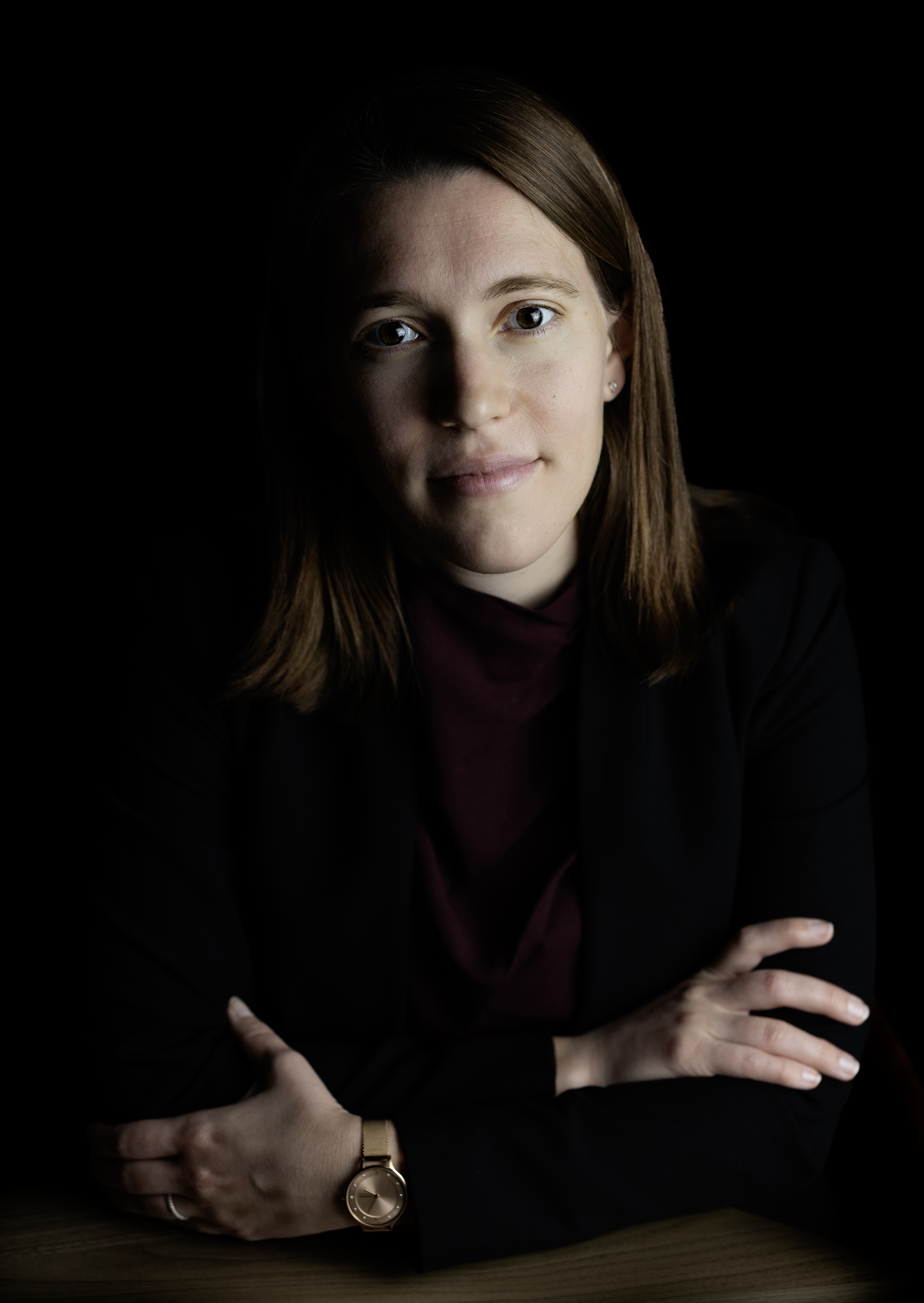
- Clark in 2024
- Education: University of North Carolina at Chapel Hill (B.S.); Columbia University (PhD)
- Awards: Time 100 Next (2026); Helen B. Warner Prize (2025); National Science Foundation CAREER Award (2025); Sloan Research Fellowship (2024)
- Scientific career
- Fields: Astrophysics
- Workplaces: Stanford University

Susan E. Clark is an American astrophysicist and professor who currently serves as an assistant professor of physics at Stanford University and also serves as co-director of the Stanford Center for Decoding the Universe. Her work focuses on the interstellar medium. She was awarded the Helen B. Warner Prize for Astronomy in 2025 and was named as one of the Time 100 Next of 2026.

== Biography ==
She studied at the University of North Carolina at Chapel Hill and earned a bachelor's degree in physics. While there, she co-founded the Women in Physics club. She then went on to earn a PhD in astrophysics from Columbia.

She became a Hubble Fellow, hosted by the Institute for Advanced Study, in 2017. As her position did not involve teaching, she built up teaching experience by volunteer-teaching college-level astrophysics courses with the Prison Teaching Initiative at Princeton University.

In September 2021, she started as a professor at the Stanford University. She became co-director of the Center for Decoding the Universe at Stanford upon its launching in October 2024.

As a professor, her focus has been on the physics of the interstellar medium and especially on interstellar magnetic fields, with one of her main focuses being on mapping the dust distribution and magnetic field changes through polarization of background light. She helped discover Galactic ISM Fibers (elongated, slender, linear structures of atomic hydrogen), and created the Rolling Hough Transform to analyze them. In 2026, she began developing interpretable foundation models for galaxies, utilizing artificial intelligence to integrate multi-wavelength telescope data.

She was awarded a Sloan Research Fellowship in 2024. She was awarded the Helen B. Warner Prize for Astronomy in 2025 for "Seminal contributions to our observations of cosmic magnetism, and for the development of innovative observational techniques for studying the interstellar medium and cosmological foregrounds." She was awarded a National Science Foundation CAREER Award in 2025 for her project "Untangling the physics of the magnetic, multiphase interstellar medium".

She was named as one of the Time 100 Next in 2026: her profile was written by Scott Tremaine. She also received a Stanford HAI Seed Research Grant in 2026.
