= Michael S. Turner =

American theoretical cosmologist

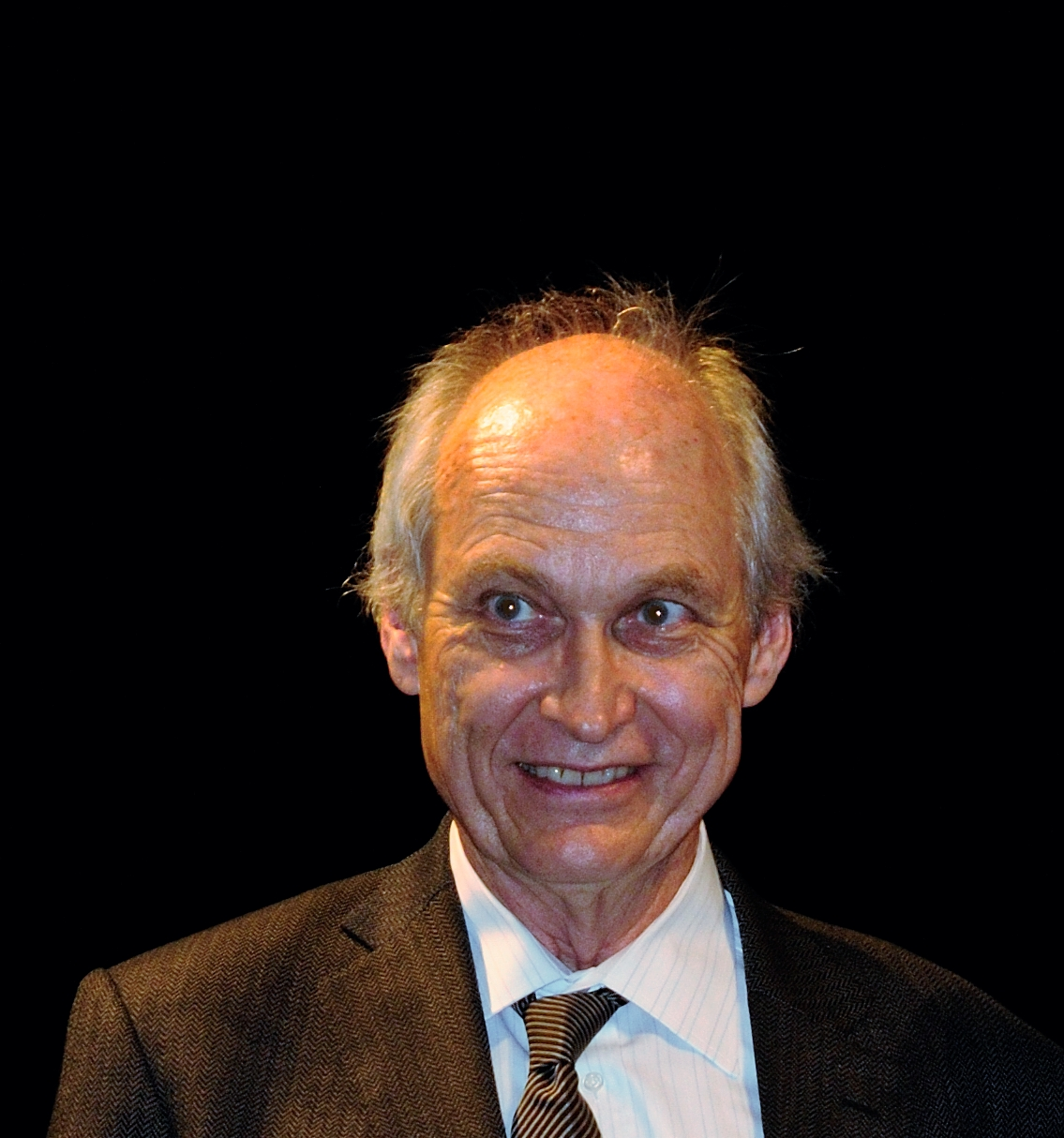
- Born: July 29, 1949 (age 77); Los Angeles
- Education: Stanford University
- Known for: coining the term dark energy
- Scientific career
- Fields: Physical cosmology
- Workplaces: University of Chicago
- Doctoral students: Marc Kamionkowski; Arthur Kosowsky; Joshua A. Frieman

External videos
- Michael Turner - The Dark Side of the Universe, April 8, 2011.

Michael S. Turner (born July 29, 1949) is an American theoretical cosmologist who coined the term dark energy in 1998. He is the Rauner Distinguished Service Professor Emeritus of Physics at the University of Chicago, having previously served as the Bruce V. & Diana M. Rauner Distinguished Service Professor, and as the assistant director for Mathematical and Physical Sciences for the US National Science Foundation.

Turner's book The Early Universe, co-written with fellow Chicago cosmologist Edward Kolb, is a standard text on the subject. The 2003 National Academy study, Connecting quarks with the cosmos: eleven science questions for the new century, which Turner chaired, identified opportunities at the intersection of astronomy and physics and has helped shape science investment in the US in this area. In 2022, Turner was appointed as a co-leader, with Maria Spiropulu, of a National Academies of Science, Engineering and Medicine study, leading a committee of 17 physicists world-wide to consider the strategic vision of research in elementary particle physics.

== Education ==
Turner received a B.S. in physics from the California Institute of Technology in 1971 and earned a PhD in physics from Stanford University in 1978.

== Career ==
Turner became an instructor in physics at Stanford University in 1978 and was a fellow at the Enrico Fermi Institute from 1978 to 1980. He was a visiting professor at the Institute for Theoretical Physics at the University of California, Santa Barbara, from 1981 to 1982 and became a scientist at the Fermi National Accelerator Laboratory in Batavia, Ill, in 1983.

Turner joined the faculty of the University of Chicago as an assistant professor of astronomy and astrophysics in 1980, rising to associate professor and then full professor as of 1985. He served as chair of the department from 1997 to 2003 and was named the Bruce V. and Diana M. Rauner Distinguished Service Professor of Astronomy and Astrophysics in 1998. He held a joint appointment as one of the founding members of the NASA/Fermilab Theoretical Astrophysics Group at the NASA Fermilab Astrophysics Center (NFAC).

In addition, Turner served as the president of the Aspen Center for Physics from 1989 to 1993 and as the assistant director of the National Science Foundation for Mathematical and Physical Sciences from 2003 to 2006. He has served on committees for the Department of Energy, NASA, NSF, the American Physical Society, the American Association for the Advancement of Science, the American Academy of Arts and Sciences, and the National Academy of Sciences. Turner was president of the American Physical Society in 2013.

From 2010 to 2019, Turner served as director of the Kavli Institute for Cosmological Physics at the University of Chicago. He was succeeded as director by Edward Kolb. By 2020, Turner was the Rauner Distinguished Service Professor Emeritus of Physics at UChicago.

== Research ==
With Edward Kolb, Turner helped establish the interdisciplinary field of particle astrophysics, combining cosmology and elementary particle physics to understand the origin and evolution of the Universe. His research focuses on the earliest moments of creation, and he has made contributions to inflationary cosmology, particle dark matter and structure formation, the theory of big bang nucleosynthesis, and the nature of dark energy. His work in precision cosmology combines theoretical work with measurement to better understand and test theories and models using cosmological data.

== Awards ==
- 1984, Helen B. Warner Prize of the American Astronomical Society
- 1986, Fellow of the American Physical Society, "For outstanding work at the interface of particle physics and cosmology which has led to a new understanding of the early Universe."
- 1996, Fellow, American Academy of Arts and Sciences
- 1997, Julius Edgar Lilienfeld Prize of the American Physical Society
- 1997, Member, National Academy of Sciences
- 1999, Klopsteg Memorial Award, American Association of Physics Teachers
- 2005, Fellow in Physics, American Association for the Advancement of Science
- 2010, Dannie Heineman Prize for Astrophysics of the American Astronomical Society and the American Institute of Physics
- 2017, Member, American Philosophical Society
- 2020, Legacy Fellow of the American Astronomical Society
