= Joseph Silk =

British-American astrophysicist (born 1942)

Joseph Silk FRS
- Born: 3 December 1942 (age 83); London, England
- Citizenship: UK; United States
- Education: Clare College, Cambridge; University of Manchester; Harvard University
- Awards: Royal Society Bakerian Medal (2007); Balzan Prize (2011); Gruber Prize in Cosmology (2019)
- Scientific career
- Fields: Cosmology
- Workplaces: Institut d'astrophysique de Paris; University of Oxford; University of California, Berkeley; Johns Hopkins University
- Doctoral students: Max Tegmark; Jill Tarter

Joseph Ivor Silk FRS (born 3 December 1942) is a British-American astrophysicist. He was the Savilian Chair of Astronomy at the University of Oxford from 1999 to September 2011.

He is an Emeritus Fellow of New College, Oxford and a Fellow of the Royal Society (elected May 1999). He was awarded the 2011 Balzan Prize for his works on the early Universe. Silk has given more than two hundred invited conference lectures, primarily on galaxy formation and cosmology.

== Biography ==
He was educated at Tottenham County School (1954–1960) and went on to study Mathematics at the University of Cambridge (1960–1963), followed by a diploma in astrophysics at the University of Manchester under the supervision of Roger Jennison. He obtained his PhD in Astronomy from Harvard in 1968, under the direction of David Layzer. Silk took up his first post at Berkeley in 1970, and the Chair in Astronomy in 1978. Following a career of nearly 30 years there, Silk returned to the UK in 1999 to take up the Savilian Chair of Astronomy at the University of Oxford. He is currently Professor of Physics at the Institut d'astrophysique de Paris, Université Pierre et Marie Curie, Homewood Professor of Physics and Astronomy at Johns Hopkins University (since in 2010), and was Professor of Astronomy at Gresham College from 2015 to 2019.

== Silk damping ==
The structure of the cosmic microwave background anisotropies is principally determined by two effects: acoustic oscillations and diffusion damping. The latter is also called collisionless or Silk damping after Joseph Silk.

== Honors and awards ==
- 1972 and 1974 Sloan Research Fellow
- 1975: Guggenheim Fellow
- 1995: Fellow of the American Physical Society
- 1999: Fellow of the Royal Society
- 2007: Inclusion in the American Academy of Arts and Sciences
- 2008: Gold Medal of the Royal Astronomical Society
- 2011: Balzan Prize for his works on the early Universe
- 2014: Member of the US National Academy of Sciences
- 2018: Henry Norris Russell Lectureship
- 2019: Gruber Prize in Cosmology with Nicholas Kaiser "for their seminal contributions to the theory of cosmological structure formation and probes of dark matter"
- 2020: Fellow of the American Astronomical Society
- 2020: Nick Kylafis Lecturer

== Publications ==
Silk has over 900 publications, nearly 200 as first author, of which 3 have been cited over 1000 times, over 50 have been published in Nature and 12 in Science.

In 2011, Silk delivered a talk, "The Creation of the Universe," at the first Starmus Festival in the Canary Islands. The talk was subsequently published in the book Starmus: 50 Years of Man in Space.

=== Books by Joseph Silk ===
- The Infinite Cosmos, Oxford University Press, 2006, ISBN 978-0-19-953361-9
- On the Shores of the Unknown: A Short History of the Universe, Cambridge University Press, 2005, ISBN 0-521-83627-1, Google Link
- The Big Bang, W.H. Freeman, 2005, ISBN 0-7167-1812-X
- Cosmic Enigmas, Springer, 1994, ISBN 1-56396-061-3, Google Link
