= Uroš Seljak =

Slovenian cosmologist

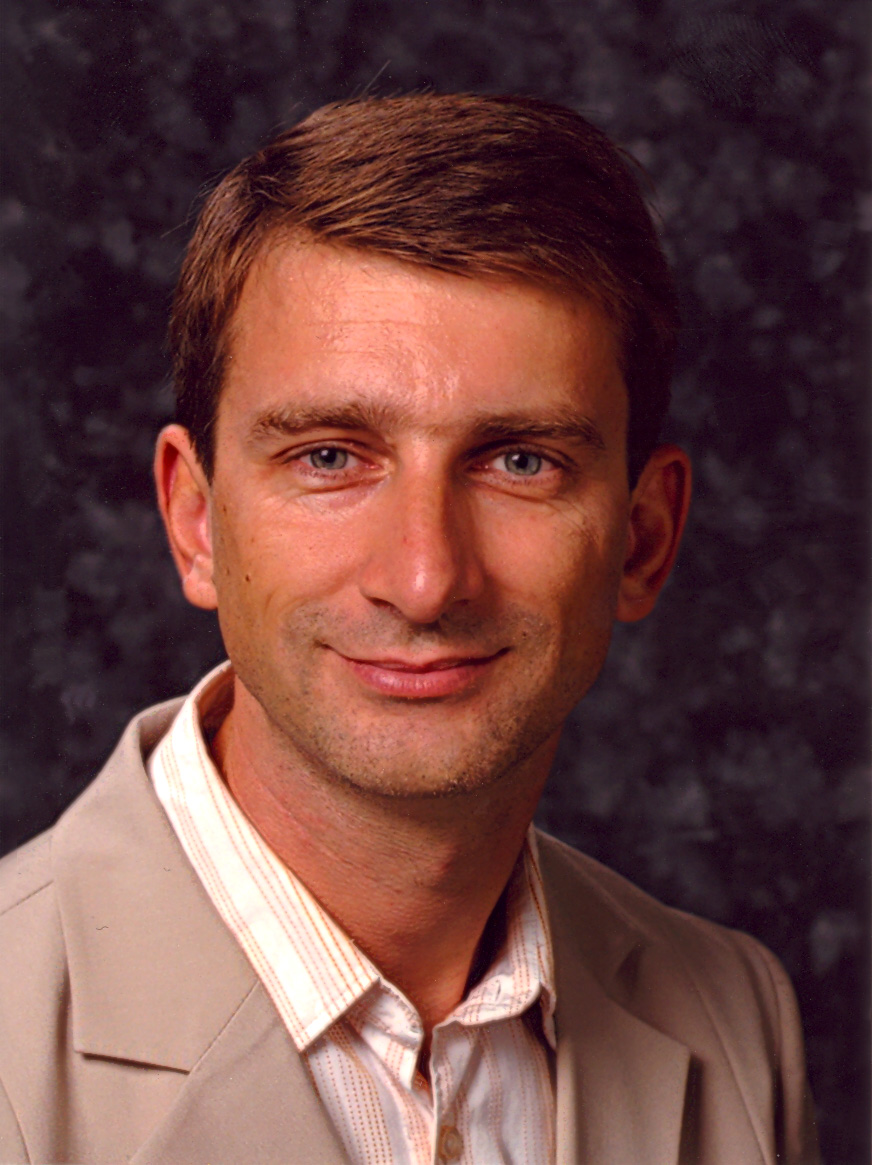
- Uroš Seljak in 2011
- Born: 13 May 1966 (age 60)
- Citizenship: Slovenian, United States
- Education: University of Ljubljana, Slovenia (1989, 1991) *MIT (1995)
- Occupations: Professor in Physics and Astronomy Departments, UC Berkeley; Senior Faculty Scientist, LBNL Berkeley
- Known for: E and B-modes, CMBFAST code
- Awards: Helen B. Warner Prize for Astronomy (2001); Gruber Prize in Cosmology (2021)
- Scientific career
- Fields: Cosmology; Theoretical and observational astrophysics; Statistical data analysis in astrophysics; Bayesian statistical methodology; Machine learning
- Thesis: Light propagation in a weakly perturbed expanding universe (1995)
- Doctoral advisor: Edmund Bertschinger

Uroš Seljak (born 13 May 1966 in Nova Gorica) is a Slovenian cosmologist and a professor of astronomy and physics at University of California, Berkeley. He is particularly well-known for his research in cosmology and approximate Bayesian statistical methods.

== Biography ==
Seljak completed his secondary education at the Nova Gorica Grammar School and carried out his undergraduate studies at the University of Ljubljana, Slovenia. He graduated in 1989 and later received a Master's degree from the same institution in 1991. Seljak conducted his doctoral research at Massachusetts Institute of Technology and received his PhD in 1995.

After postdoctoral studies at the Center for Astrophysics | Harvard & Smithsonian, he held faculty positions at Princeton University, the International Centre for Theoretical Physics in Trieste, Italy, and the University of Zurich, before joining the UC Berkeley physics and astronomy departments in 2008. He holds a joint appointment with the Lawrence Berkeley National Laboratory.

== Career ==
Seljak is a cosmologist who is particularly well-known for his research on cosmic microwave background radiation, galaxy clustering and weak gravitational lensing, and the implications of these observations for the large scale structure of the universe.

In 1997, Seljak predicted the existence of B-modes in CMB polarization that are a tracer of primordial gravitational waves from inflation. Together with Matias Zaldarriaga, he developed the CMBFAST code for CMB Temperature, E and B-mode polarization, and for gravitational lensing effects on CMB.

In 2000, he developed the halo model for dark matter and galaxy clustering statistics.

Much of Seljak's recent work has been focused on how to extract fundamental properties of our universe from cosmological observations using analytical methods and numerical simulations. He has developed cosmological generative models of dark matter, stars and cosmic gas distributions.

Seljak is actively developing methods for accelerated approximate Bayesian methodologies, and applying them to cosmology, astronomy, and other sciences. Examples of this work are the MicroCanonical Hamiltonian and Langevin Monte Carlo and Deterministic Langevin Monte Carlo samplers.

Seljak is developing machine learning methods with applications to cosmology, astronomy, and other sciences. Notable examples include Fourier-based Gaussian processes for analysis of time and/or spatially ordered data, generative models with explicit physics symmetries (translation, rotation), and sliced iterative transport methods for density estimation and sampling.

=== Honours and awards ===
Seljak was awarded the 2021 Gruber Prize in Cosmology jointly with Marc Kamionkowski and Matias Zaldarriaga, who together "introduced numerous techniques for the study of the large-scale structure of the universe as well as the properties of its first instant of existence."

- David and Lucille Packard Research Fellow (2000)
- Sloan Research Fellow (2001)
- Helen B. Warner Prize for Astronomy (2001)
- Fellow of the American Physical Society (2013)
- Member of the US National Academy of Sciences (2019)
- Highest cited Slovenian scientist (2019)
- Wiki Science Competition international winner (2019-2020)
- Gruber Prize in Cosmology (2021)
- Honorary Doctorate, University of Ljubljana (2023)
- Member of American Academy of Arts and Sciences (2024)

== Notable students ==
- Chris Hirata
