= Helen B. Warner Prize for Astronomy =

The Helen B. Warner Prize for Astronomy is awarded annually by the American Astronomical Society to a young astronomer (aged less than 36, or within 8 years of the award of their PhD) for a significant contribution to observational or theoretical astronomy. The prize was established by Helen Blakemoor Warner.

== List of winners ==
This list is from the American Astronomical Society's website.

- 1954 Aden Meinel
- 1955 George Herbig
- 1956 Harold Johnson
- 1957 Allan Sandage
- 1958 Merle F. Walker
- 1959 E. Margaret Burbidge, Geoffrey Burbidge
- 1960 Halton Arp
- 1961 Joseph W. Chamberlain
- 1962 Robert Kraft
- 1963 Bernard F. Burke
- 1964 Maarten Schmidt
- 1965 George W. Preston
- 1966 Riccardo Giacconi
- 1967 Pierre Demarque
- 1968 Frank J. Low
- 1969 Wallace L. W. Sargent
- 1970 John N. Bahcall
- 1971 Kenneth Kellermann
- 1972 Jeremiah P. Ostriker
- 1973 George Carruthers
- 1974 Dimitri Mihalas
- 1975 Patrick Palmer, Ben Zuckerman
- 1976 Stephen E. Strom
- 1977 Frank Shu
- 1978 David Schramm
- 1979 Arthur Davidsen
- 1980 Paul C. Joss
- 1981 William H. Press
- 1982 Roger Blandford
- 1983 Scott D. Tremaine
- 1984 Michael S. Turner
- 1985 Lennox L. Cowie
- 1986 Simon D. M. White
- 1987 Jack Wisdom
- 1988 Mitchell C. Begelman
- 1989 Nicholas Kaiser
- 1990 Ethan T. Vishniac
- 1991 Shrinivas Kulkarni
- 1992 Edmund Bertschinger
- 1993 John F. Hawley
- 1994 David N. Spergel
- 1995 E. Sterl Phinney
- 1996 Fred C. Adams
- 1997 Charles C. Steidel
- 1998 Marc Kamionkowski
- 1999 Lars Bildsten
- 2000 Wayne Hu
- 2001 Uroš Seljak
- 2002 Adam Riess
- 2003 Matias Zaldarriaga
- 2004 William Holzapfel
- 2005 Christopher Reynolds
- 2006 Re’em Sari
- 2007 Sara Seager
- 2008 Eliot Quataert
- 2009 Scott Gaudi
- 2010 Scott Ransom
- 2011 Steven R. Furlanetto
- 2012 Eric B. Ford
- 2013 Mark R. Krumholz
- 2014 Christopher M. Hirata
- 2015 Ruth Murray-Clay
- 2016 Philip F. Hopkins
- 2017 Charlie Conroy
- 2018 Yacine Ali-Haïmoud
- 2019 Jo Bovy
- 2020 Smadar Naoz
- 2021 Rebekah Dawson
- 2022 Brett McGuire
- 2023 Ana Bonaca
- 2024 Carl Rodriguez
- 2025 Susan E. Clark
- 2026 Kyle Kremer

== See also ==
- List of astronomy awards
