= David L. Lambert =

British-American astronomer

David L. Lambert is a British-American astronomer, who does research on stellar atmospheres, the chemical composition of stars, and the chemical evolution of the universe.

Born in Ashford, Kent, England, Lambert received his PhD in 1965 from the University of Oxford. In 1967 he became an immigrant to the USA to work at the California Institute of Technology, then in 1969 at The University of Texas at Austin, where in 1974 he became a professor. From 2003 until 2014 he was the director of McDonald Observatory, part of The University of Texas at Austin.

David L. Lambert is a member of the International Astronomical Union.

== Awards ==
- 1987: Dannie Heineman Prize for Astrophysics
- 2007: Henry Norris Russell Lectureship
