= Chris Hirata =

American cosmologist and astrophysicist

Christopher M. Hirata
- Born: November 30, 1982 (age 43); Ypsilanti, Michigan
- Education: California Institute of Technology, Princeton University
- Scientific career
- Fields: Cosmology Astrophysics
- Workplaces: Ohio State University
- Thesis: Weak gravitational lensing theory and data analysis (2005)
- Doctoral advisor: Uroš Seljak

Christopher Michael Hirata (born November 30, 1982) is a Japanese-American cosmologist and astrophysicist.

Hirata was 13 years old when he won the gold medal in 1996 at the International Physics Olympiad. He received a bachelor's degree in Physics at Caltech in 2001, at the age of 18. He received his PhD under the supervision of Uroš Seljak in 2005 from Princeton University in Astrophysics (thesis: "Weak Gravitational Lensing Theory and Data Analysis"). From 2005 to 2007 he was a visiting scholar at the Institute for Advanced Study. From 2006 to 2012, he was assistant professor and then full professor at Caltech before moving to the Ohio State University the following academic year in the same capacity. He is currently a professor at OSU's Center for Cosmology and AstroParticle Physics (CCAPP).

== Research ==
Hirata's research emphasis is Cosmic Microwave Background (CMB), Dark energy and accelerating expansion of the universe, galaxy clusters and the large-scale structure of the universe (and the formation of these structures, the Reionization epoch), and gravitational lenses as a tool of Cosmology. Hirata works both in theory and in the analysis of observational data as well as in the design of telescopes (specifically NASA's next generation of space telescopes). His overarching focus is on cosmology and on Dark energy.

Hirata is considered a leading exponent of precision cosmology, combining interdisciplinary computer studies, theoretical studies, and observational astronomy, including instrument development.

In 2010, with Dmitriy Tseliakhovich, he pointed to an unprecedented effect in cosmological perturbation theory for the calculation of the formation of the first structures in the universe. It is based on the fact that the speed of sound in baryonic matter (as opposed to dark matter) decreased drastically (from relativistic to thermal velocities) when the first atoms formed (recombination epoch), which leads to supersonic velocity currents of baryonic matter (which under gravitational influence of faster dark matter moves) and quadratic perturbation terms. According to Hirata and Tseliakhovich, this leads to a suppression of the formation of the first structures with observable effects.

With others, he initiated a program for analyzing information from astronomical data for possible inferences on fundamental questions of particle physics and what it might suggest for creating new observation programs. A central question is whether the acceleration of the universe indicates dark energy (retention of general relativity but with an additional dynamic scalar field) or a modification of the general theory of relativity.

He is a member of NASA's proposed Nancy Grace Roman Space Telescope (previously named the Wide Field Infrared Survey Telescope space telescope).

== Accolades ==
- 2012 - Presidential Early Career Award (PECASE)
- 2013 - Simons Foundation Investigator
- 2014 - Helen B. Warner Prize
- 2018 - New Horizons in Physics Prize for fundamental contributions to understanding the formation of the first galaxies in the universe and for sharpening and applying the most powerful tools of precision cosmology
