= Richard McCray =

American astronomer and astrophysicist (1937–2021)

Richard Alan McCray (24 November 1937 – 26 October 2021) was an American astronomer and astrophysicist.

McCray received his B.S. in physics from Stanford University in 1959 and his Ph.D. in physics in 1967 from the University of California, Los Angeles with thesis advisor Peter Goldreich. McCray was a research fellow at Caltech from 1967 to 1968 and then an assistant professor at Harvard University from 1968 to 1971. At the department of astrophysical and planetary sciences of the University of Colorado Boulder, he was from 1971 to 1975 an associate professor, from 1975 to 1997 a full professor, from 1997 to 2004 the George Gamow Distinguished Professor Astrophysics, and from 2004 to 2013 a professor emeritus. Since 2013, he has been a visiting scholar at the University of California, Berkeley.

He was a visiting scholar at the Goddard Space Flight Center of the NASA in 1983–1984, at Peking University and Nanjing University in Fall 1987, at the Space Telescope Science Institute in Spring 1988, at Columbia University in 1989–1990, and at the University of California, Berkeley in Spring 1997.

McCray's research was concerned with the theory of interstellar gas dynamics and the theory of cosmic X-ray sources. In particular for interstellar gas dynamics, he did research on the formation of interstellar bubbles by stellar winds and superbubbles formed by multiple supernova explosions in galactic gas disks. His research on cosmic X-ray sources has dealt with, among other topics, the mechanism of the transformation of X-ray emission in the optical and UV range for neutron stars and black holes. He studied and modeled the evolution of the spectrum of SN1987A and with several colleagues made some correct predictions about events involving the SN1987A ring system. In addition to theoretical calculations and computer simulations, he made observations using the Hubble Space Telescope and the Chandra X-ray Observatory.

He was a Guggenheim Fellow for the academic year 1975–1976. He was elected in 1989 a member of the National Academy of Sciences and in 2004 a Fellow of the American Association for the Advancement of Science. In 1990 he received the Dannie Heineman Prize for Astrophysics.
