= Lennox Cowie =

British astronomer (born 1950)

Lennox Lauchlan Cowie FRS (born 18 October 1950, Jedburgh, Scotland) is a British astronomer, and professor at the Institute for Astronomy, University of Hawaiʻi.

== Biography ==
In 1970, Cowie graduated from the University of Edinburgh with a BSc with First Class Honours. He then graduated from Harvard University with a Ph.D in theoretical physics in 1976. As a post-doc, he was at Princeton University, where he became an associate professor in 1979. In 1980, he was a Fairchild Scholar at California Institute of Technology. Beginning in 1980, he was a professor at Massachusetts Institute of Technology and from 1983 at the Space Telescope Science Institute. In 1984, Cowie became a professor at Johns Hopkins University and then in 1986 a professor at the Institute for Astronomy at the University of Hawaiʻi, where he was also associate director 1986 to 1997.

Cowie's research deals with the dynamics of interstellar and intergalactic gas. At the University of Hawaiʻi, he investigated, with the telescope on Mauna Kea and with the Hubble Space Telescope, the oldest stars and galaxies in the universe and their formation and early development.

== Awards and honours ==
In 1984, Cowie won the Harvard University Bok Prize and in 1985 the Helen B. Warner Prize from the American Astronomical Society. He was elected a Fellow of the Royal Astronomical Society, a Fellow of the American Physical Society in 1988, and a Fellow of the Royal Society in 2004. He was awarded the 2009 Dannie Heineman Prize for Astrophysics. He was elected a Legacy Fellow of the American Astronomical Society in 2020.
