= Hylogenesis =

Physical theory about dark matter and antimatter

Hylogenesis is a physical theory about the mechanism behind the origins of dark matter and antimatter. It was proposed in August 2010 in a paper by Hooman Davoudiasl, David E. Morrissey, Kris Sigurdson and Sean Tulin.

The theory involves a fermion X, and its antiparticle X̅, both of which may couple into quarks in the visible sector, and into hidden particles in a hidden sector, a sector which is not part of the Standard Model. The hidden states have masses near a GeV and very weak couplings to particles in the Standard Model. X and X̅ respectively decay into either baryonic matter or hidden baryonic matter, and into either antibaryonic matter or hidden antibaryonic matter, violating CP and quark baryon number.

An excess of baryonic matter is created in the visible sector, and an excess of antimatter is created in the hidden sector. The hidden antimatter is explained as being stable dark matter. The X and X̅ particles have a conserved baryon number charge, so equal and opposite charges appear in the visible and hidden sectors. Therefore, the Universe's total baryon charge stays zero.

== See also ==
- Baryogenesis
