= Marc Kamionkowski =

American theoretical physicist (born 1965)

- Born: 1965 (age 60–61); Cleveland, Ohio, U.S.
- Education: Washington University University of Chicago
- Known for: Gravitational waves; dark matter/dark electromagnetism; inflation; cosmic microwave background
- Awards: Helen B. Warner Prize (1998); E. O. Lawrence Award (2006); Dannie Heineman Prize for Astrophysics (2015); Gruber Prize in Cosmology (2021)
- Scientific career
- Fields: Physics, Astrophysics
- Workplaces: Institute for Advanced Study Columbia University California Institute of Technology Johns Hopkins University
- Doctoral advisor: Michael Turner
- Doctoral students: Adrienne Erickcek; Kris Sigurdson

Marc Kamionkowski (born 1965) is an American theoretical physicist and currently the William R. Kenan, Jr. Professor of Physics and Astronomy at Johns Hopkins University. His research interests include particle physics, dark matter, inflation, the cosmic microwave background and gravitational waves.

== Career ==
Kamionkowski received a BA degree in 1987 from Washington University in St. Louis and a PhD in 1991 from the University of Chicago. He did postdoctoral study at the Institute for Advanced Study and joined the faculty of Columbia University in 1994 as an assistant professor of physics. From 1999 to 2006, Kamionkowski was a professor at The California Institute of Technology, and from 2006 to 2011 the Robinson Professor of Theoretical Physics and Astrophysics. He joined the faculty at Johns Hopkins as professor in 2011.

He is known primarily for work on supersymmetric dark matter and the cosmic microwave background. He was awarded the US Department of Energy's 2006 E. O. Lawrence Award in High Energy and Nuclear Physics for "his theoretical analyses demonstrating that precise observations of the cosmic microwave background can lead to deep understanding of the origin and evolution of the Universe, thereby motivating a series of increasingly precise cosmological experiments".

== Academic positions ==
- 2016–Present: William R. Kenan, Jr. Professor, Department of Physics and Astronomy, Johns Hopkins University.
- 2011–2015: Professor of physics and astronomy, Johns Hopkins University.
- 2010 Fall: Miller Visiting Research Professor, Department of Physics, University of California, Berkeley.
- 2006–2012: Robinson Professor of Theoretical Physics and Astrophysics, California Institute of Technology.
- 2006–2011: Founding director, Moore Center for Theoretical Cosmology and Physics, California Institute of Technology.
- 1996–2007: Professor of theoretical physics and astrophysics, California Institute of Technology
- 1998–1999: Associate professor, Department of Physics, Columbia University.
- 1994–1998: Assistant professor, Department of Physics, Columbia University.

== Awards and fellowships ==
- National Merit Scholar (1983-1987)
- Phi Beta Kappa (1986)
- NASA GSRP Fellow (1989)
- SSC National Fellowship (1991)
- Alfred P. Sloan Research Fellowship (1996)
- DoE Outstanding Junior Investigator Award (1998)
- Helen B. Warner Prize (1998)
- E. O. Lawrence Award (2006)
- American Physical Society Fellowship (2008)
- American Academy of Arts and Sciences (2013)
- Simons Investigator (2014)
- Dannie Heineman Prize for Astrophysics (2015)
- International Society on General Relativity and Gravitation Fellowship (2016)
- Fellow of the American Association for the Advancement of Science (2017)
- National Academy of Sciences (2019)
- Fellow of the American Astronomical Society (2020)
- Gruber Prize in Cosmology (2021), jointly with Uroš Seljak and Matias Zaldarriaga
