= Matias Zaldarriaga =

Argentine cosmologist

- Born: Coghlan, Buenos Aires
- Citizenship: Argentine
- Education: Massachusetts Institute of Technology; University of Buenos Aires
- Known for: CMBFAST code
- Awards: MacArthur Fellows Program; Helen B. Warner Prize for Astronomy (2003); Gribov Medal (2005); Buchalter Cosmology Prize (2020); Gruber Prize in Cosmology (2021)
- Scientific career
- Workplaces: Institute for Advanced Study; Harvard University; New York University
- Thesis: Fluctuations in the cosmic microwave background (1998)
- Doctoral advisor: Edmund Bertschinger
- Website: www.ias.edu/scholars/zaldarriaga

Matias Zaldarriaga is a theoretical physicist best known for his work on cosmology. He has made significant contributions toward understanding both astrophysical phenomena and fundamental physics, most notably through his research on modeling the early universe and analyzing statistical properties of cosmic microwave background data. Zaldarriaga grew up in Buenos Aires, Argentina and received his undergraduate degree from the University of Buenos Aires in 1994. He received his PhD in 1998 from the Massachusetts Institute of Technology, followed by a postdoctoral fellowship at the Institute for Advanced Study in Princeton, NJ. Zaldarriaga was an assistant professor at New York University from 2001 to 2002, and a professor at Harvard University from 2004 to 2009, there he received a MacArthur Fellowship in 2006. He is currently a professor at the Institute for Advanced Study, where he has been a faculty member since 2009.

== Life ==
Born in Coghlan neighbourhood, Buenos Aires, at the present time he works in the Institute for Advanced Study located in Princeton, New Jersey, United States. He is known especially for his work on the cosmic microwave background (CMB). Together with Uros Seljak, he developed the CMBFAST code, the first computationally efficient method for computing the anisotropy of the CMB for an arbitrary set of cosmological parameters. In 2018, he was elected a member of the National Academy of Sciences.

== Awards ==
In 2003, he was awarded the Helen B. Warner Prize for Astronomy by the American Astronomical Society, and in 2005 he won the Gribov Medal of the European Physical Society. In 2006, he was the recipient of a MacArthur Fellowship. In 2020, he was jointly awarded the Buchalter Cosmology Prize. Zaldarriaga was awarded the 2021 Gruber Prize in Cosmology jointly with Uroš Seljak and Marc Kamionkowski, who together "introduced numerous techniques for the study of the large-scale structure of the universe as well as the properties of its first instant of existence."
