= Kris Sigurdson =

- Scientific career
- Fields: physics
- Workplaces: University of British Columbia
- Doctoral advisor: Marc Kamionkowski

Kris Sigurdson is a Canadian physicist and cosmologist. He is an associate professor in the University of British Columbia's department of physics and astronomy in Vancouver, British Columbia. He was previously a NASA Hubble Fellow and Member of the Institute for Advanced Study. He received a Ph.D. in physics from the California Institute of Technology.

Sigurdson is known for his work on the effects of dark matter interactions on cosmological perturbations, new models of dark matter particle physics, and the potential for observing signatures of the multiverse with cosmology. His other work includes contributions in the physics of the early universe, cosmological perturbation theory, and cosmic 21-cm fluctuations.

In 2010, he co-authored a paper proposing the theory of hylogenesis, a theory of the origin of matter that links the formation of dark matter to baryogenesis. The theory predicts that in the long term protons or neutrons can be destroyed by interactions with dark matter.
