= Joshua A. Frieman =

Theoretical astrophysicist

- Born: Joshua A. Frieman
- Education: University of Chicago
- Known for: Astrophysics, Dark Energy Survey
- Scientific career
- Fields: Physics
- Workplaces: University of Chicago; Fermilab
- Doctoral advisor: Michael Turner

Joshua A. Frieman is a theoretical astrophysicist who lives and works in the United States. He is Associate Lab Director of the Fundamental Physics Directorate at SLAC, formerly a senior scientist at Fermilab, and a professor of astronomy and astrophysics at the University of Chicago. Frieman is known for his work studying dark energy and cosmology, and he co-founded the Dark Energy Survey experiment. He was elected a member of the National Academy of Sciences in 2022.

== Education ==
Frieman received his undergraduate degree in physics from Stanford University in 1981 and his PhD in physics from the University of Chicago in 1985. His doctoral advisor was Michael Turner and his thesis was titled Particle Creation in Inhomogeneous Spacetimes.

== Career ==
After completing his PhD, Frieman held a postdoc position at SLAC National Accelerator Laboratory's Theory Group. Afterwards, Frieman became a scientist at Fermilab in 1988. He was head of that lab's Theoretical Astrophysics Group from 1994 to 1999. During the 1990s, one of the topics he studied was cosmic inflation. In 1997, he was elected a Fellow of the American Physical Society for "his many contributions in the application of particle physics to early-universe cosmology."

During the 2000s, Frieman led the Sloan Digital Sky Survey's (SDSS) Supernova Survey, which discovered over 500 type Ia supernovae, aiding the study of cosmic expansion. He also served as chair of the SDSS's Collaboration Council and co-chair of its Large-Scale Structure Working Group. In these roles, he led measurements of the large-scale structure of the universe and of weak gravitational lensing. Building on his work with SDSS, Frieman later co-founded and served as director of the Dark Energy Survey (DES) with the goal of collecting data that would help physicists determine which theoretical models explaining the increasing rate of the expansion of the universe might be correct. The Dark Energy Survey began its observations in 2013 and concluded them in 2019. These observations produced a large amount of data, which the DES collaboration is still analyzing. In 2004, Frieman was elected a fellow of the American Association for the Advancement of Science and also became a member of the Fermilab Center for Particle Astrophysics when the lab created the center that year. Frieman became head of Fermilab's Particle Physics Division in 2018. In 2019, the United States Department of Energy named him a DOE Office of Science Distinguished Scientists Fellow "for pioneering advances in the science of dark energy and cosmic acceleration, including leading the Sloan Digital Sky Survey-II Supernova Survey, co-founding the Dark Energy Survey and service as its Director." Frieman was also elected to a three-year term as president of the Aspen Center for Physics in 2019.

== Personal life ==
Frieman is the son of Edward A. Frieman, plasma physicist and former director of the Office of Science within the United States Department of Energy.

== Honors and awards ==
- American Physical Society Fellow, 1997
- American Association for the Advancement of Science Fellow, 2004
- McMaster Cosmology Lecturer, 2008
- American Academy of Arts and Sciences Fellow, 2016
- U.S. Department of Energy Office of Science Distinguished Scientists Fellow, 2019
