= Robert Lupton =

British scientist

Robert Lupton is a British scientist who, as of 2026, is senior research astronomer at Princeton University. He was the 2021 recipient of the Dannie Heineman Prize for Astrophysics for this work on the Sloan Digital Sky Survey.

Originally from the United Kingdom, Lupton studied as an undergraduate at the University of Cambridge before earning his PhD in astronomy from Princeton. Prior to joining the Princeton faculty, he was a researcher at the Space Telescope Science Institute and a faculty member at the University of Hawaii.
