= Goldreich-Kylafis effect =

Quantum mechanical effect

The Goldreich-Kylafis (GK) effect is a quantum mechanical effect with applications in Astrophysics. The theoretical background of the work was published by Peter Goldreich and his at the time postdoc Nick Kylafis in a series of two papers in The Astrophysical Journal.

The GK effect predicts that, under special conditions, the spectral lines emitted by interstellar molecules should be linearly polarized and the linear polarization vector should reveal the magnetic field direction in the molecular cloud. Even a μG magnetic field is enough for this effect. The lines arise from rotational transitions of molecules, say J=1 to J=0, where J is the rotational quantum number. If the magnetic sublevels of the J=1 level are equally populated, as it is usually the case, then the line is unpolarized. However, if the magnetic sublevels are unequally populated, then the line is polarized. Goldreich & Kylafis (1981) showed that, if the radiation field (their own plus external) in which the molecules are embedded is anisotropic, then the magnetic sublevels are unequally populated. Since isotropic radiation fields are practically non existent in Nature (e.g. only at the center of an isolated perfectly spherical molecular cloud), the effect should be easily detectable. This is however not the case as some specific conditions are required for detection. These are that the line optical depth of the molecular cloud should be of order unity and that the radiative rates should be comparable to or larger than the collisional rates.

Since the observed lines from molecular clouds are broad, due to velocity gradients in the cloud, the GK effect has the potential to reveal the magnetic field direction along the line of sight. It has been reported in star forming regions, in thermal-pulsating (TP-) AGB stars and recently in the disk around the T Tauri star TW Hya.
