= Rachel Somerville =

American astrophysicist

Rachel S. Somerville is an American astrophysicist and astronomer and holds the George A. and Margaret M. Downsbrough Chair in Astrophysics at Rutgers University. She is known for theoretical research into galaxy formation and evolution. She was awarded the 2013 Dannie Heineman Prize for Astrophysics “for providing fundamental insights into galaxy formation and evolution using semi-analytic modeling, simulations and observations.”

== Career ==
Somerville attended Gompers Secondary School in San Diego, a math/science/computer magnet school, where she first became interested in physics. She holds an undergraduate degree in physics from Reed College, awarded in 1989, and a Ph.D. in 1997 from the University of California, Santa Cruz, where she worked with Joel Primack. Her postdoctoral appointments included the Hebrew University in Jerusalem and Cambridge University. She held the position of Assistant Professor at the University of Michigan and was a staff astronomer at the Max Planck Institute for Astronomy in Heidelberg. She held a joint appointment at the Johns Hopkins University and the Space Telescope Science Institute. In July 2011 she joined the faculty of Rutgers University as a professor in the Department of Physics and Astronomy, where she was appointed the inaugural holder of the George A and Margaret M. Downsbrough Chair in Astrophysics.

Somerville is a member of the GOODS team to survey the formation and evolution of galaxies in the early universe. She leads the theoretical group of the CANDELS survey, the largest project yet undertaken with the Hubble Space Telescope. She is recognized for creating computer simulations of the physics underlying galaxy formation and evolution.

She is married to Rutgers professor of law and philosophy Alec Walen.
