= Edmund Bertschinger =

American theoretical astrophysicist and cosmologist

- Education: Caltech; Princeton University
- Scientific career
- Fields: Physics, Astronomy
- Workplaces: University of Virginia UC Berkeley Massachusetts Institute of Technology
- Doctoral advisor: Jeremiah P. Ostriker
- Doctoral students: Chung-Pei Ma; Uros Seljak; Matias Zaldarriaga

Edmund Bertschinger (born 1958) is an American theoretical astrophysicist and cosmologist and professor of physics at MIT.

== Career ==
Bertschinger received his bachelor's degree in physics from Caltech in 1979, and his Ph.D. degree in astrophysical science from Princeton University in 1984. He held postdoctoral positions at the University of Virginia and UC Berkeley, then went to MIT as an assistant professor of physics in 1986 becoming a full professor in 1996. He served as head of the physics department from 2007 to 2013 and currently serves as the Institute Community and Equity Officer. He has served on various committees promoting women and minorities in astronomy and physics. He has received numerous fellowships and awards including the Guggenheim Fellowship and Helen B. Warner Prize for Astronomy. He was elected Fellow of the American Association for the Advancement of Science in 2015 and the American Physical Society in 1996.

== Research ==
Bertschinger is known for his work on large-scale simulations of galaxy formation (N-body simulation), the study of galaxy velocity fields (Peculiar velocity), and various problems in relativistic astrophysics. He has made substantial contributions to cosmological perturbation theory and structure formation in the universe.

== Selected publications ==
- Bertschinger, Edmund; Zukin, Phillip (July 2008). "Distinguishing Modified Gravity from Dark Energy". Physical Review D. 78 (2) 024015. arXiv:0801.2431. Bibcode:2008PhRvD..78b4015B. doi:10.1103/PhysRevD.78.024015. S2CID 119192486.
- Bertschinger, Edmund (November 2001). "Multiscale Gaussian Random Fields and Their Application to Cosmological Simulations". The Astrophysical Journal Supplement Series. 137 (1): 1–20. arXiv:astro-ph/0103301. Bibcode:2001ApJS..137....1B. doi:10.1086/322526. S2CID 118811357.
- Bertschinger, Edmund (September 1998). "Simulations of Structure Formation in the Universe". Annual Review of Astronomy and Astrophysics. 36: 599–654. Bibcode:1998ARA&A..36..599B. doi:10.1146/annurev.astro.36.1.599.
- Bertschinger, Edmund (April 1995). "Cosmological Dynamics". NASA Sti/Recon Technical Report N. 96: 22249. arXiv:astro-ph/9503125. Bibcode:1995STIN...9622249B.
- Ma, Chung-Pei; Bertschinger, Edmund (December 1995). "Cosmological Perturbation Theory in the Synchronous and Conformal Newtonian Gauges". The Astrophysical Journal. 455: 7–25. arXiv:astro-ph/9506072. Bibcode:1995ApJ...455....7M. doi:10.1086/176550. S2CID 14570491.
- Bertschinger, Edmund; Dekel, Avishai (December 1989). "Recovering the Full Velocity and Density Fields from Large-scale Redshift-distance Samples". Astrophysical Journal Letters. 336: L5–L8. Bibcode:1989ApJ...336L...5B. doi:10.1086/185348.
- Bertschinger, Edmund (May 1985). "Self-similar Secondary Infall and Accretion in an Einstein-de Sitter Universe". The Astrophysical Journal Supplement Series. 58: 39–65. Bibcode:1985ApJS...58...39B. doi:10.1086/191028.
