= Peter Scheuer =

British astrophysicist

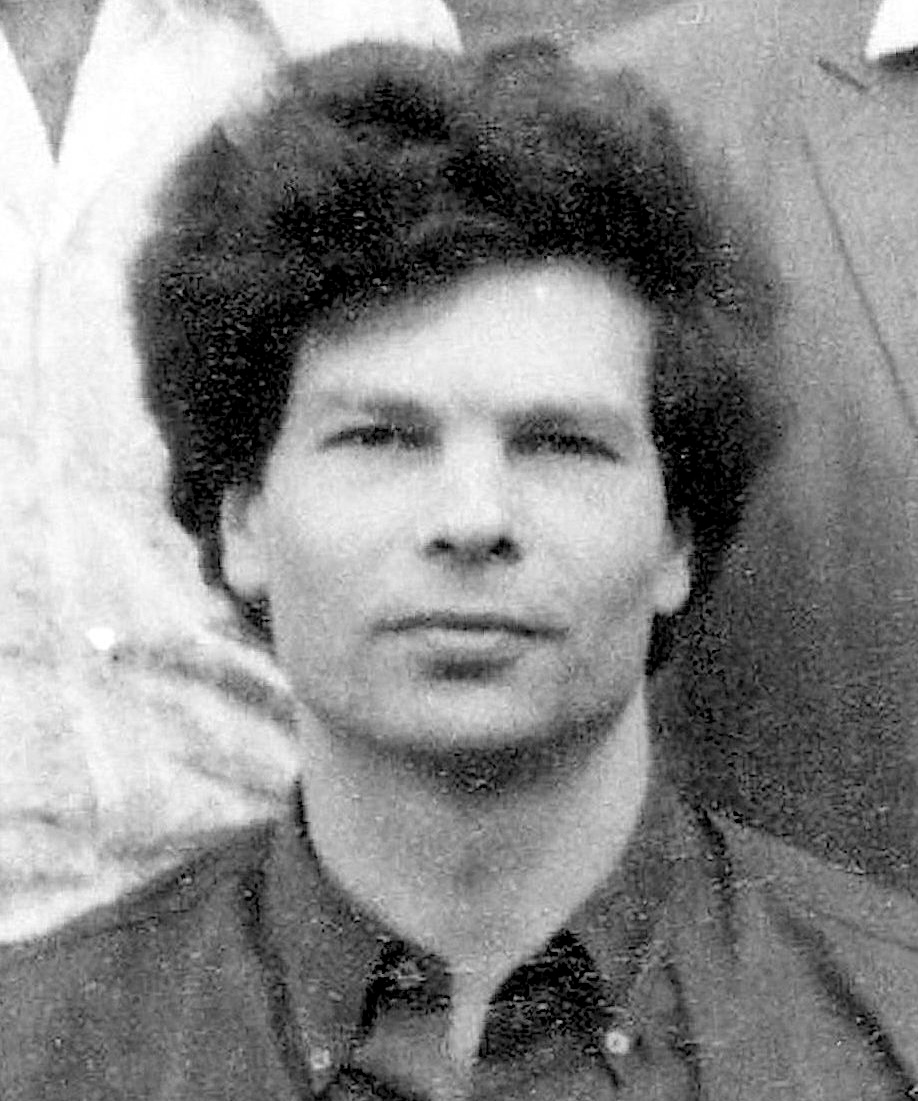
- Scheuer in 1971
- Born: March 31, 1930; Frankfurt am Main
- Died: January 21, 2001 (aged 70); West Wickham, Cambridgeshire
- Education: University of Cambridge
- Known for: Analysis of confusion-limited surveys; effect of neutral intergalactic medium on quasar spectra; models of jets in radio galaxies
- Scientific career
- Fields: Cosmology, Astrophysics
- Workplaces: University of Cambridge
- Doctoral advisor: Sir Martin Ryle
- Doctoral students: Malcolm Longair, Tony Bell

Peter August Georg Scheuer (31 March 1930 – 21 January 2001) was a German-born British astrophysicist and radio astronomer, who made major contributions in theory and observation to extragalactic astronomy and cosmology. In particular, he created the P(D) method that allowed number counts of extragalactic radio sources to be estimated in the presence of source confusion; he independently proposed the Gunn-Peterson trough as a means of detecting intergalactic neutral hydrogen; he produced some of the earliest arguments for ejection of relativistic jets from the centres of active galaxies and quasars.

== Early life and education ==
Scheuer was born in Frankfurt am Main, of Jewish ancestry, and escaped to the UK in 1938, where he eventually studied physics at the University of Cambridge. In 1951, he remained in Cambridge to join the radio astronomy research group of Sir Martin Ryle, working as Ryle's PhD student. He was eventually given a position on the tenured teaching staff of the Cavendish Laboratory, as an assistant director of research, in 1963. At the same time, he became a Fellow of Peterhouse. He was subsequently promoted to Reader in 1992, and remained at Cambridge for the rest of his career.

== Scientific achievements ==
Scheuer made a definitive contribution to the 1950s controversy over radio source counts. The early radio surveys claimed a large excess of faint sources, in conflict with the predictions of the steady-state cosmology. This issue was the subject of heated debate between Ryle and Sir Fred Hoyle. One difficulty was that the early surveys were 'confusion limited': what appeared to be a single faint source was often a blend of several still fainter objects, thus boosting the counts. Scheuer solved this problem by developing the 'P(D) method', showing how the counts were boosted and allowing the correct counts to be extracted - and demonstrating that they were still in conflict with steady-state predictions. The P(D) method remains widely used in astronomical imaging surveys, as testified by the continuing citations to Scheuer's 1957 paper.

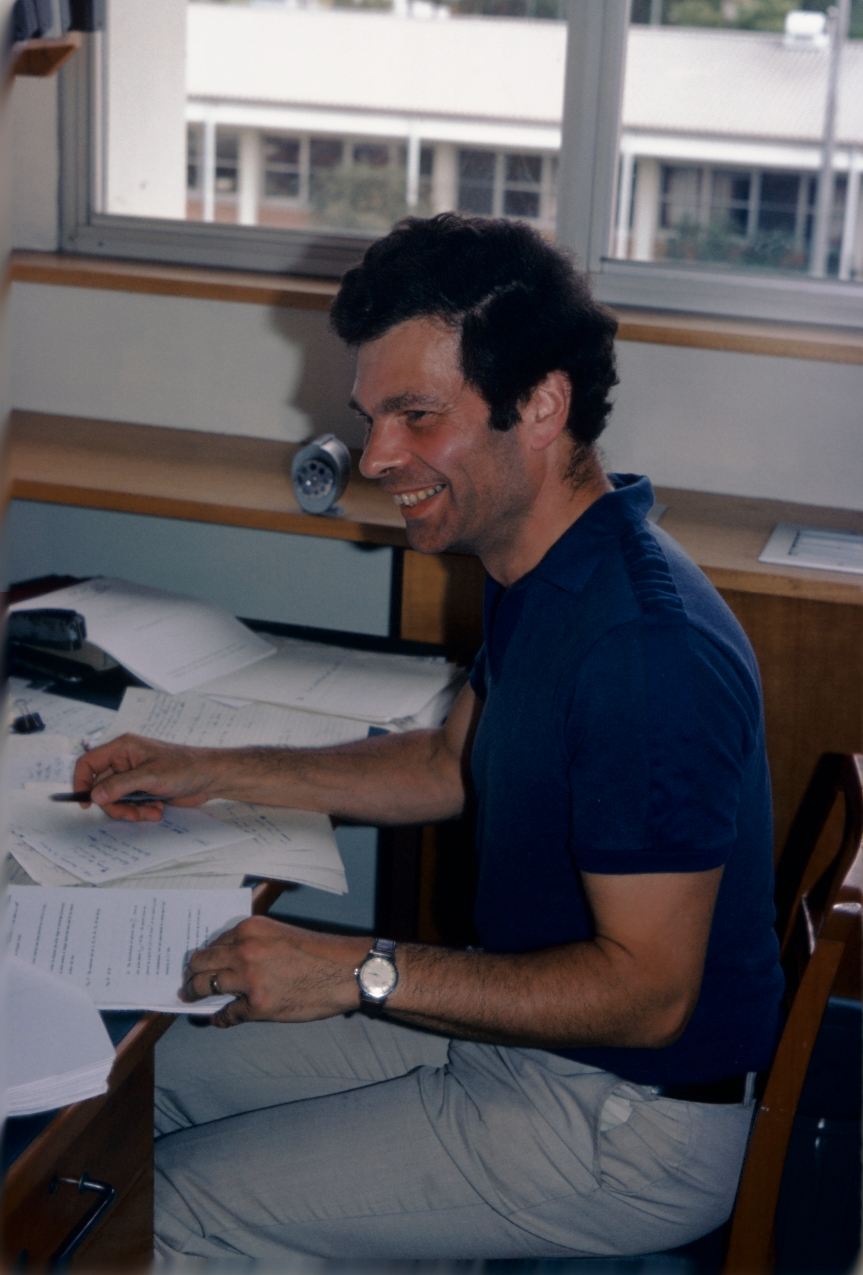
Scheuer in 1981

Scheuer developed an interest in the intergalactic medium and realised that the spectra of quasars offered an extremely sensitive probe of neutral gas: even a neutral fraction of order a part in 100,000 would be sufficient to cause noticeable absorption of the rest-frame UV continuum shortwards of the Lyman-alpha emission line. At the time, this set only an upper limit to the density - but as quasars were found at higher redshifts, the predicted trough was detected. This is now known as the Gunn-Peterson trough after two American astronomers who made the same prediction, but Scheuer invented the idea independently and at the same time.

But the majority of Scheuer's research works relate to his longstanding efforts as a theorist seeking to explain the powerful emission from the radio galaxies being detected by Ryle's radio telescopes. These were often of a double morphology, and Scheuer showed that this could be accounted for if the energy of the radiating electrons was built up by energy supplied from the central galaxy. In due course, it would be demonstrated that the central source of energy was a supermassive black hole and the connecting jets would be imaged directly; but Scheuer's early analysis was general and independent of this detailed evidence.

The first direct evidence for relativistic jets in active galaxies came when the high-brightness cores of quasars were seen via very long baseline interferometry to be ejecting blobs of emitting plasma with apparent transverse velocities greater than that of light. This superluminal motion makes sense if the jets move with high Lorentz factors and are directed nearly along the line of sight. Scheuer & Readhead realised that such motion would be accompanied by relativistic beaming and enhancement of the apparent flux density, leading observational selection to favour jets aligned with the line of sight. This then raised the question of the appearance of objects where the jets were directed transversely, and Scheuer & Readhead proposed the first unified scheme for radio sources, suggesting that the misaligned objects would be radio-quiet quasars. It is now believed that this is not correct, and that the misaligned objects would be radio galaxies. But this original idea of beaming-based unification was immensely influential.

== Death ==
Scheuer died at his home in West Wickham, Cambridgeshire, on 21 January 2001. He was survived by his wife, Jane Elizabeth Morford, and his daughter, Suzi.
