= Gunn–Peterson trough =

Feature of the spectra of quasars

In astronomical spectroscopy, the Gunn–Peterson trough is a feature of the spectra of bright high redshift sources, particularly quasars and gamma-ray burst afterglows, due to the presence of neutral hydrogen in the Intergalactic medium (IGM) before the epoch of reionization. The trough is characterized by suppression of electromagnetic emission from the source at wavelengths just below that of a redshifted Lyman series line. As the radiation came towards us and was progressively redshifted, photons at wavelengths higher than that line were never absorbed by the hydrogen because they did not have enough energy to cause the ground-state hydrogen to jump to the higher state corresponding to the line, whereas photons of somewhat higher energy were absorbed when they got redshifted to the wavelength of the line (for instance 91 nanometres for the Lyman alpha line). Photons of even higher energy did not get redshifted to the appropriate wavelength until after the hydrogen of the intergalactic medium was reionized, and so were not absorbed. The trough is thus the span of wavelengths where absorption did take place. The low-wavelength end of the trough is at a redshift of about 6 from the true Lyman wavelength, since reionization occurred around the time corresponding to that redshift, whereas the high-wavelength end of the trough is at the redshift of the source, greater than 6.

This effect was originally predicted in 1965 by James E. Gunn and Bruce Peterson, and independently by Peter Scheuer.

== First detection ==
Zero flux troughs by different Lyman absorbers in the spectrum of first confirmed observation of the effect.

For over three decades after the prediction, no objects had been found distant enough to show the Gunn–Peterson trough. It was not until 2001, with the discovery of a quasar with a redshift z = 6.28 by Robert Becker and others using data from the Sloan Digital Sky Survey, that a Gunn–Peterson trough was finally observed. The article also included quasars at redshifts of z = 5.82 and z = 5.99, and, while each of these exhibited absorption of photons with energies just above that of the Lyman-alpha transition (or, wavelengths just to the blue side of the transition), there were numerous spikes in flux as well, indicating having traversed pockets of space with negligible neutral hydrogen. The flux of the quasar at z = 6.28, however, was effectively zero at energies just above that of Lyman-alpha transition, meaning that the neutral hydrogen fraction in the IGM must have been larger than ~10^{−3}.

== Evidence for reionization ==
In the present day universe, the intergalactic medium (IGM; the space between galaxies) contains very low density plasma. Very early in the history of the universe, prior to the formation of the first stars, electrons and protons first became bound as neutral hydrogen atoms during an epoch known as recombination. The period during which the first objects in the universe started emitting light and energy that would drive the transition from neutral to ionized matter in the IGM is known as reionization. The study of objects with Gunn–Peterson troughs in their spectra provide a means for studying the late phases of this epoch of reionization.

The discovery of the Gunn–Peterson trough in a z = 6.28 quasar indicated that the universe still had an appreciable, if small, neutral hydrogen fraction at that time. As photons with energies near that of the Lyman-alpha transition have scattering cross sections with neutral hydrogen that are very high, even a small fraction of neutral hydrogen will make the optical depth of the IGM high enough to cause the suppression of emission. Meanwhile, the absence of the trough in quasars detected at redshifts just below z = 6 presented evidence for the process of reionization having completed by about z = 6. Subsequent to the original discovery of a Gunn–Peterson trough, detection of a trough as low as z ≈ 5.6 suggests that reionization of the universe is inhomogeneous and incomplete at z = 5.6.

Following the first release of data from the WMAP spacecraft in 2003, the determination by Becker that the end of reionization occurred at z ≈ 6 appeared to conflict with estimates made from the WMAP measurement of the electron column density. However, the WMAP III data released in 2006 now seems to be in much better agreement with the limits on reionization placed by observation of the Gunn–Peterson trough.

Recent observations of quasi-stellar objects have shown strong absorption gaps in regions with redshifts as low as z ≈ 5.3 indicating that reionization was not uniformly spread through the IGM. Simulations have shown that low-mass galaxies could have initially contributed to reionization until their star formation was radiatively suppressed, potentially explaining these islands of neutral hydrogen persisting at lower redshifts.

The opacity of the Lyman-alpha forest varies with line of sight around redshift z ~ 5.5 where Gunn-Peterson troughs begin to appear. Although earlier studies found this variation to align with the nonlinear relationship between the optical depth (opacity) of the Lyman-alpha forest and the density of the IGM, newer studies have shown otherwise. The variations in optical depth are much stronger than predicted when around and above z ~ 5.5, suggesting that the neutral hydrogen fraction contains a large amount of variance depending on line of sight and providing further evidence of reionization not occurring evenly through the IGM. In their paper, Davies et al. prepare two possible methods to model these fluctuations. The first method assigns UV luminosities from galaxies to dark matter halos and matches the ratio of ionizing-to-UV luminosities with the ionization rate of hydrogen at a given redshift. The second method utilizes a reionization redshift field created from various reionization maps between z = 5.8 and z = 13. These two models for optical depth provide conflicting results, with the validity of either having great effect on existing understanding of the speed and spatial variance of reionization.

It has also been shown that islands of neutral hydrogen cannot account for absorption gaps alone, leading to investigation of dense systems within ionized regions of the IGM referred to as Lyman Limit Systems or small scale absorbers. This is supported by the abundance of these systems in the post-reionization era as neutral hydrogen disappears.

== See also ==
- Lyman-alpha forest
