= Edwin Bergin =

American astrophysicist

Edwin (Ted) Bergin (born 15 February 1967) is a US astrophysicist who is currently the Professor of Astronomy at the University of Michigan (2019).

He was born in Philadelphia, Pennsylvania and awarded a BS in Astronomy at Villanova University in 1989 and a PhD at the University of Massachusetts in 1995. After five years as a research assistant at the University of Massachusetts at Amherst (1990–95), he was appointed astronomer/astrophysicist at the Center for Astrophysics | Harvard & Smithsonian. He took the post of assistant professor of astronomy at Michigan in 2003, became associate professor in 2007 and full professor in 2011.

He investigates the physics and chemistry involved in planet and star formation, including the molecular origins of life. He is at the present time (2019) concentrating on the study of water and organics to determine the conditions under which molecules are formed and how they react to radiation.

He was part of the team that determined that ice on the comet 103P/Hartley (Hartley 2) has the same chemical composition as the oceans of Earth and was also involved in the detection of cold water vapor in the planet-forming disk of the star TW Hydrae. Both discoveries support the theory that the Earth's water may have originated in the comets of the Kuiper-belt.

== Honors and awards ==
- U-M Henry Russel Award for exceptional scholarship and teaching.
- 2019 Dannie Heineman Prize for Astrophysics
- 2020 Elected a Legacy Fellow of the American Astronomical Society
