= Dannie Heineman Prize for Astrophysics =

Recognizes outstanding mid-career work in the field of astrophysics

The Dannie Heineman Prize for Astrophysics is jointly awarded each year by the American Astronomical Society and American Institute of Physics for outstanding work in astrophysics. It is funded by the Heineman Foundation in honour of Dannie Heineman.

== Recipients ==
Source: AAS

- 1980 Joseph H. Taylor, Jr.
- 1981 Riccardo Giacconi
- 1982 P. James E. Peebles
- 1983 Irwin I. Shapiro
- 1984 Martin Rees
- 1985 Sandra M. Faber
- 1986 Hyron Spinrad
- 1987 David L. Lambert
- 1988 James E. Gunn
- 1989 Carl E. Heiles
- 1990 Richard McCray
- 1991 Wallace L. W. Sargent
- 1992 Bohdan Paczyński
- 1993 John C. Mather
- 1994 John N. Bahcall
- 1995 Jerry E. Nelson
- 1996 Roger A. Chevalier
- 1997 Scott D. Tremaine
- 1998 Roger Blandford
- 1999 Kenneth C. Freeman
- 2000 Frank Shu
- 2001 Bruce G. Elmegreen
- 2002 J. Richard Bond
- 2003 Rashid Sunyaev
- 2004 Bruce T. Draine
- 2005 George Efstathiou, Simon White
- 2006 Marc Davis
- 2007 Robert Kennicutt
- 2008 Andrew Fabian
- 2009 Lennox L. Cowie
- 2010 Edward Kolb, Michael Turner
- 2011 Robert P. Kirshner
- 2012 Chryssa Kouveliotou
- 2013 Rachel Somerville
- 2014 Piero Madau
- 2015 David Spergel, Marc Kamionkowski
- 2016 Wendy L. Freedman
- 2017 Lars Bildsten
- 2018 Vicky Kalogera
- 2019 Edwin Bergin
- 2020 Christopher Kochanek
- 2021 Robert Lupton, David Weinberg
- 2022 Norman Murray
- 2023 Karen Meech
- 2024 John Carlstrom
- 2025 Priyamvada Natarajan

== See also ==
- Dannie Heineman Prize for Mathematical Physics
- List of astronomy awards
- List of physics awards
- Prizes named after people
