= Arthur Kosowsky =

Theoretical physicist and cosmologist

- Education: Washington University in St. Louis (BS 1989); University of Chicago (PhD 1994)
- Scientific career
- Workplaces: Harvard; Rutgers; University of Pittsburgh
- Doctoral advisor: Michael Turner (cosmologist)

Arthur Kosowsky is a theoretical physicist and cosmologist, and chair of the Department of Physics and Astronomy at the University of Pittsburgh.

== Biography ==
Arthur Kosowsky received his B.S. in physics in 1989 from Washington University in St. Louis, where he was an Arthur Holly Compton Fellow. In 1994, he received his Ph.D. in physics under the supervision of Michael Turner, where he was an NSF Graduate Research Fellow and a NASA GSRP fellow. He then held positions as a Junior Fellow at Harvard University and as assistant then associate professor at Rutgers, before moving to the University of Pittsburgh, where he is a Professor and Chair of the Department of Physics and Astronomy. He was divisional associate editor for Physical Review Letters.

Kosowsky was elected a fellow of the American Physical Society in 2014 for "landmark contributions to cosmology, including pioneering work on the use of CMB fluctuations for precision cosmology and pioneering work on the origin and detection of primordial gravitational waves." In addition to his theoretical research, he collaborates on observational work through the Atacama Cosmology Telescope and Simons Observatory.
