= Rebekah Dawson =

American astrophysicist

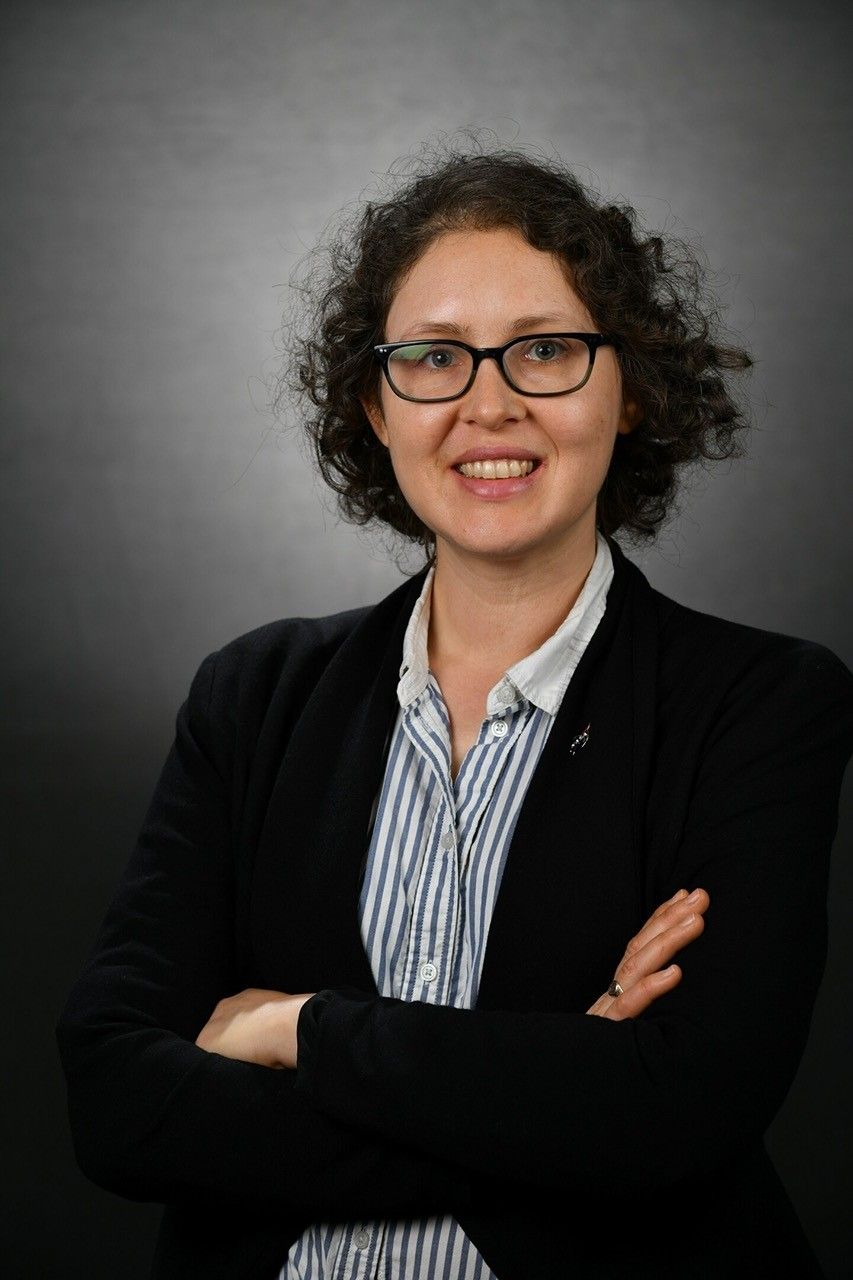
- Education: Wellesley College, Harvard University, Miller Institute
- Awards: Annie Jump Cannon Award in Astronomy (2017); Helen B. Warner Prize for Astronomy (2021)
- Scientific career
- Fields: Astrophysics, Exoplanets, Hot Jupiters
- Workplaces: Pennsylvania State University
- Thesis: On the Migratory Behavior of Planetary Systems (2013)
- Doctoral advisor: Ruth Murray-Clay

Rebekah Dawson is an American astrophysicist and a former associate professor of astronomy and astrophysics at Pennsylvania State University. Her research focuses on simulating the evolution of exoplanetary orbits and compositions to better understand how planetary systems form.

== Career ==
In 2009, Rebekah Dawson received a B.A. in astrophysics at Wellesley College. She then went to Harvard University where she got a A.M. in Astronomy in (2011) and a Ph.D. in astronomy and astrophysics supervised by Ruth Murray-Clay in 2013. She went on to her postdoctoral research at the Miller Institute for Basic Research in Science from 2013 to 2015.

In January 2016, she started working as an assistant professor of astronomy and astrophysics at Penn State University. She was named the Shaffer Career Development Professor in Science in October 2020 and was promoted to the rank of associate professor in July 2021. She left Penn State for NASA in 2024.

== Awards ==
In 2017, she was awarded the Annie Jump Cannon Award in Astronomy by the American Astronomical Society "for her work modeling the dynamical interactions of exoplanets in multiplanet systems."

In 2018, Dawson was named as an Alfred P. Sloan Foundation Research Fellow.

Dawson was awarded the 2020 Harold C. Urey Prize by the Division for Planetary Sciences, a division of the American Astronomical Society, "in recognition of her groundbreaking research on planetary dynamics, the formation of planetary systems, and the characterization of exoplanets on close-in orbits."

She was again honored by American Astronomical Society in 2021 with the Helen B. Warner Prize for Astronomy "for her important contributions on planet formation and dynamics, particularly on hot Jupiter exoplanets and the connection between planetary composition and orbital structure."
