= Ruth Murray-Clay =

North American astrophysicist

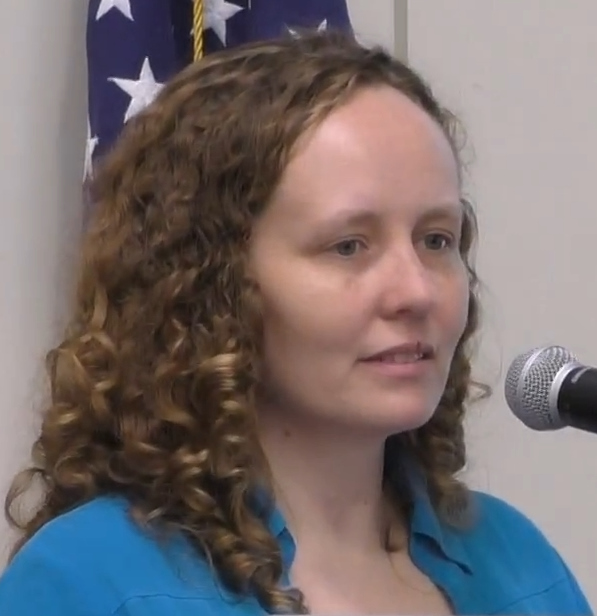
- Ruth Murray-Clay in November 2017
- Education: University of California, Berkeley (Ph.D. 2008); University of California, Berkeley (M.A. 2004); Harvard University (A.B. 2001)
- Known for: Planet formation
- Scientific career
- Fields: Astrophysics; Exoplanets
- Workplaces: University of California Santa Cruz
- Doctoral advisor: Eugene Chiang
- Doctoral students: Rebekah Dawson

Ruth Murray-Clay is an American astrophysicist. She is a professor at the University of California Santa Cruz who studies the formation of planetary systems.

== Career ==
Murray-Clay graduated magna cum laude with an A.B. from Harvard University in 2001, then moved to the University of California, Berkeley where she earned an MA in 2004 and Ph.D. in 2008 under the supervision of Eugene Chiang. She was a postdoctoral fellow at the Harvard University Institute for Theory and Computation until 2010 when she became a lecturer at Harvard University. In September 2014 she joined University of California, Santa Barbara where she held the title of assistant professor of physics. She joined University of California, Santa Cruz in 2016 as associate professor of astronomy and astrophysics, and in 2017, she became the first holder of the E. K. Gunderson Family Chair in Theoretical Astrophysics at UC Santa Cruz.

== Awards ==
In 2008, Murray-Clay received the Mary Elizabeth Uhl Prize for her dissertation work done while at University of California, Berkeley. In 2012, she became a Kavli Fellow of the National Academy of Sciences. She was awarded the American Astronomical Society's Helen B. Warner Prize for Astronomy in 2015.

== Public life ==
Murray-Clay came into the public spotlight in 2015 after BuzzFeed released a story detailing astronomer Geoffrey Marcy's sexual harassment of women and the university's apparent inaction, ultimately leading to Marcy's resignation. Murray-Clay, who was a student at University of California, Berkeley during the period of harassment, came forward to describe her attempts to stop the harassment and the lack of action by university officials. Her involvement is credited with helping to bring attention to sexual harassment in the field of astronomy.
