= Sherry Suyu =

Observational cosmologist

Sherry H. Suyu is a Canadian observational cosmologist whose research uses gravitational lensing of supernovae and quasars to study the expansion of the universe. She works in Germany as a Max Planck Fellow at the Max Planck Institute for Astrophysics, associate professor and head of the Observational Cosmology group at the Technical University of Munich, and leader of the H0LiCOW and HOLISMOKES collaborations for gravitational lensing of quasars and supernovae respectively.

== Education and career ==
Suyu grew up in Canada, and is a 2001 graduate of Queen's University at Kingston in Canada. She completed a Ph.D. at the California Institute of Technology in 2008. Her doctoral dissertation, Dissecting the gravitational lens B1608+656: Implications for the Hubble constant, was jointly supervised by Roger Blandford and Kip Thorne.

After postdoctoral research at the University of Bonn, University of California, Santa Barbara, and Stanford University, she worked as a faculty member at the Academia Sinica Institute of Astronomy and Astrophysics in Taiwan from 2013 to 2016, close to her parents. She returned to Germany in 2016 with a joint position at the Max Planck Institute for Astrophysics and Technical University of Munich. In 2022 she was promoted to associate professor and Max Planck Fellow.

== Recognition ==
Suyu received the Significant Research Achievements Award of the Academia Sinica in 2013. She was the 2021 recipient of the Lancelot M. Berkeley − New York Community Trust Prize for Meritorious Work in Astronomy of the American Astronomical Society. In 2022, the Technical University of Munich gave her its Heinz Maier-Leibnitz Medal.
