= Roger Blandford =

British theoretical astrophysicist

Roger David Blandford
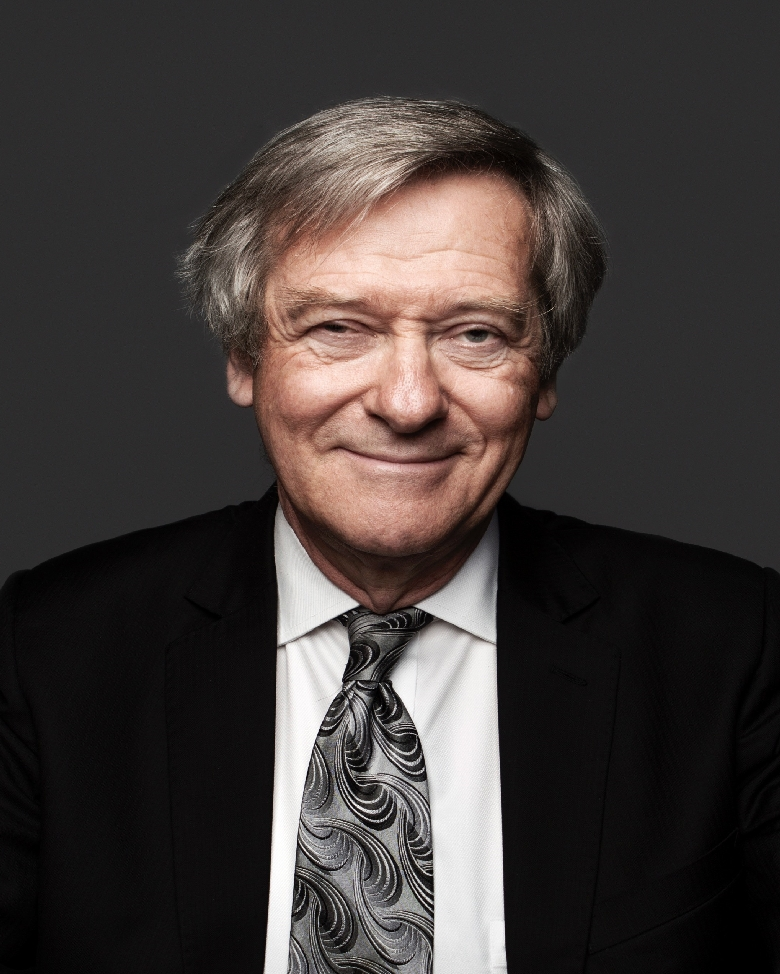
- Born: 28 August 1949 (age 77); Grantham, Lincolnshire, England
- Education: Magdalene College, Cambridge; St John's College, Cambridge; Institute for Advanced Study
- Awards: Helen B. Warner Prize (1982); Dannie Heineman Prize for Astrophysics (1998); Eddington Medal (1999); Gold Medal of the Royal Astronomical Society (2013); Shaw Prize (2020)
- Scientific career
- Fields: Astronomy
- Workplaces: California Institute of Technology; Stanford Linear Accelerator Center; Stanford University; Kavli Institute for Particle Astrophysics and Cosmology
- Doctoral advisor: Martin Rees
- Doctoral students: Lars Hernquist; Sherry Suyu

Roger David Blandford (born 1949) is a British theoretical astrophysicist, best known for his work on black holes.

== Early life ==
Blandford was born in Grantham, England and grew up in Birmingham, where he attended King Edward's School.

== Career ==
Blandford is famous in the astrophysical community for the Blandford–Znajek process, which is a mechanism for powering relativistic jets by the extraction of rotational energy from a black hole. The Blandford–Znajek mechanism has been invoked by the Event Horizon Telescope Collaboration to explain the jet power in the first observation of a black hole shadow in the giant elliptical galaxy M87. Blandford also theorized another mechanism for jet formation through hydromagnetic winds launched from accretion disks. In addition to the Blandford–Znajek and Blandford–Payne mechanisms for the formation of relativistic jets, Roger Blandford also helped devise a widely used theoretical model for jet geometric and spectral properties, the Blandford–Königl conical jet model, used to predict radio shifts and low-frequency spectral slopes for optically thick jet cores. He has also made significant contributions to other astrophysical phenomena such as supernovae, by extending the Sedov–Taylor blast wave solution to the ultra-relativistic limit of the Blandford–McKee solution.

In April 2005 he wrote a letter to the astronomy community showing his concern about the George W. Bush administration US space science policy.

He was also the chair of Astro2010, the decadal survey that helps define and recommend funding priorities for U.S. astronomy research in the upcoming decade. The Astro2010 report was released 13 August 2010.

== Positions ==
Blandford is a Fellow of the Royal Society, Member of the U.S. National Academy of Sciences, Fellow of the Royal Astronomical Society and Fellow of the American Academy of Arts and Sciences. He is currently Luke Blossom Professor in the School of Humanities and Sciences at Stanford University, Professor of Physics at Stanford University and at Stanford Linear Accelerator Center (SLAC) National Accelerator Laboratory. He was the Pehong and Adele Chen Director, Kavli Institute for Particle Astrophysics and Cosmology from 2003 to 2013. He was a co-editor of the Annual Review of Astronomy and Astrophysics (2005–2011).

== Awards ==
- 2020 – Elected a Legacy Fellow of the American Astronomical Society
- 2020 – Shaw Prize in Astronomy
- 2016 – Crafoord Prize
- 2013 – Gold Medal of the Royal Astronomical Society
- 2011 – Humboldt Prize
- 1999 – Eddington Medal
- 1998 – Dannie Heineman Prize for Astrophysics
- 1982 – Helen B. Warner Prize for Astronomy
