= Edward Kolb =

American cosmologist

Edward W. Kolb
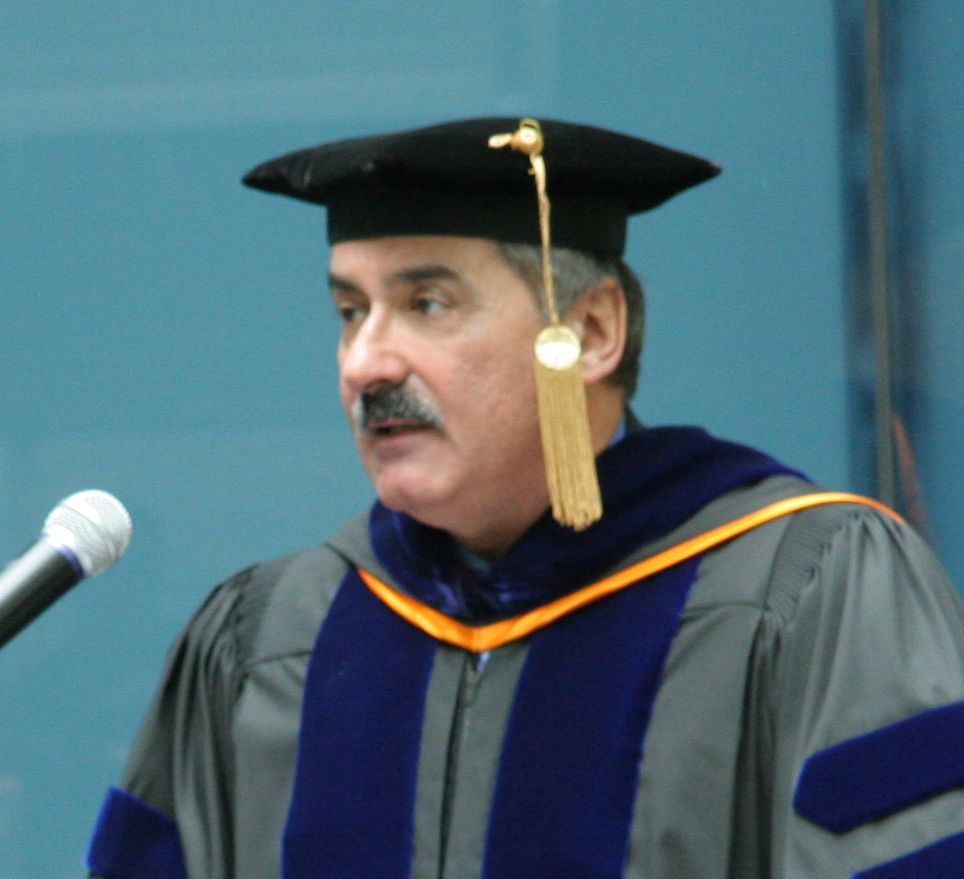
- Kolb speaking at Shimer College
- Born: October 2, 1951 (age 74); New Orleans, Louisiana
- Citizenship: US
- Education: University of New Orleans, University of Texas – Austin
- Awards: Oersted Medal (2003); Dannie Heineman Prize for Astrophysics (2010)
- Scientific career
- Fields: Physical Cosmology
- Workplaces: Fermi National Accelerator Laboratory; University of Chicago

Edward W. Kolb, known as Rocky Kolb, (born October 2, 1951) is a cosmologist and a professor at the University of Chicago as well as the dean of Physical Sciences. He has worked on many aspects of the Big Bang cosmology, including baryogenesis, nucleosynthesis and dark matter. He is author, with Michael Turner, of the popular textbook The Early Universe (Addison-Wesley, 1990). Additionally, alongside his co-author Michael Turner, Kolb was awarded the 2010 Dannie Heineman Prize for Astrophysics.

Kolb's collaborators also include Stephen Wolfram and Richard Slansky.

He received the Quantrell Award.

He is married to Adrienne Kolb, a historian of science, and has three children.
