= Eliot Quataert =

American astronomer and theoretical astrophysicist

Eliot Quataert (born 19 June 1973) is an American astronomer and theoretical astrophysicist. He was a professor at the University of California, Berkeley. In 2020, Quataert moved to Princeton University to become the Charles A. Young Professor of Astrophysical Sciences.

Quataert was the winner of the 2008 Helen B. Warner Prize for Astronomy. He was a recipient of the Donald Sterling Noyce Prize for Excellence in Undergraduate Teaching in 2010. In 2012 the Simons Foundation named him one of the first Simons Investigators and granted him at least half a million dollars over five years to pursue whatever research he wished.
