= International Astronomical Youth Camp =

The International Astronomical Youth Camp (IAYC) is an annual summer camp for young people aged 16–24 with an interest in astronomy. Established in 1969, the IAYC has taken place in over 30 different places in Europe, North Africa and the Near East. The main goal of the camp is to bring culture and astronomy together and foster a positive community atmosphere. Participants work on astronomical projects in groups. Since 1969 more than 1700 young people have taken part in the IAYC. Nowadays, around 70 people participate in each camp.

IAYC participants have continued on to gain astronomy-related careers. Examples are Conny Aerts, a Belgian astrophysicist, Ofer Lahav, an Israeli-British cosmologist, Robert H. McNaught, a Scottish-Australian astronomer, Erich Karkoschka, a German astronomer and Govert Schilling, a Dutch science journalist.

Recent camps have seen participants organising so called Preunions in advance of the camp. These events are used to get to know each other and see a little bit more of the neighbourhood, as most of the camp will take place in an isolated area. Throughout the rest of the year, many reunions take place. A returning tradition is the so-called New Year's Reunion, which is organised by a participant, anywhere in Europe. Successful reunions have seen more than 30 participants.

== Daily Schedule ==
As practical astronomy is mainly carried out during the night, the daily schedule is atypical to allow for night-time observations. A typical day is as follows:

- 11.30 hrs - Waking-up service (Run by the NAP-Leader)
- 12.00 hrs - Breakfast
- 13.00 hrs - Working group session 1
- 15.30 hrs - Free time
- 17.30 hrs - Dinner
- 19.30 hrs - Non Astronomical Program
- 22.00 hrs - Working group session 2
- 00.00 hrs – Night meal
- After midnight – Observation or free time

=== Working Groups ===
The participants are divided into groups (for which they apply in advance) that all deal with a specific field of astronomy. They then collaborate to carry out a project on the theme of the working group. The project may be done independently, in pairs, or in groups. It is carried out independently, though under the supervision of a leader. The topics each year vary, allowing for a range of scientific abilities and interests. Each group has its own leader, who decides on the group's theme, with the themes of the working groups varying greatly from theoretical to practical.

Besides the working group leaders, three other leaders are also included in the leader team. The general coordinator (GEN) takes care of supervision and is the contact person. The NAP-leader organises the Non-Astronomical Program. The Darkroom leader is responsible for the photography in the camp. They also run a darkroom in which black and white photographs are developed.

=== Free Time ===
During the free time, the participants are encouraged to organise group activities and workshops. Many use this opportunity to organise competitions between working groups or share knowledge about a topic they are interested in.

=== Non-Astronomical Program ===
The Non-Astronomical Program (NAP) is held daily to give the participants the opportunity to relax and to get to know each other better. The NAP has its own leader who organises the games and activities, many of which are played every year. The NAP is additionally responsible for other recreational activities, including:

- The Movie Game: Every year a theme is chosen, and groups are allocated a movie to produce a short parody of, with the best movies earning points for their working group.
- National Evening: Once every camp, all participants gather in groups consisting of people from their own nation. Every group gives a short presentation on their country. These are often ironic and taken very lightly.
- Poetry Evening: Participants are encouraged to share their favourite poetry, from any language, in a relaxed environment.

=== Observation ===
During the night, many participants take the opportunity to observe the night sky; camp is typically held in dark sky areas, allowing for observation with the naked eye. Working groups with practical projects will often observe to gain information for their projects or engage in astrophotography.

Many people like to go to the observation field during the peak of the Perseid showers, on the 11th of August, if the camp is taking place at that time and the sky is clear.

=== Excursions ===
During the camp there are opportunities for participants to leave the camphouse and explore the area:

- Excursion Day: Once every camp, a group outing is organised, typically to show participants something notable in the area. After that, a hike through the area may be held, or a local town visited. This day is often used to access the internet, as the participants cannot access the internet during the camp itself. The excursion day ends with a party at the camphouse.
- Free Day: On this day, the camp is 'at rest'. The participants are free to do whatever they want. Most participants choose to make a short trip in the area, while others choose to stay at the camphouse and rest.

== IWA ==
The organisation behind the IAYC is a non-profit called The International Workshop for Astronomy e.V. established in 1979. It is responsible for the camp and consists of the leaders, who are volunteers.

== Timeline ==
The first IAYC was in Germany and they continued to be held in Central Europe for many years. Later on, the camp was held in a wider variety of locations. In the late 1970s camps were held in the Near East and North Africa. Since the 1980s, the focus returned to Europe. For an area to be chosen for a camp, it must allow for observation and thus have little light pollution.

In 1999, in which the solar eclipse of that summer was a major event, 99 people participated, excluding former participants of previous camps who joined for a one-week special reunion. In recent years, the number of participants has remained stable at around 65–70.

== See also ==
- List of astronomical societies
