= James Gunn (astronomer) =

American astronomer (born 1938)

James Edward Gunn
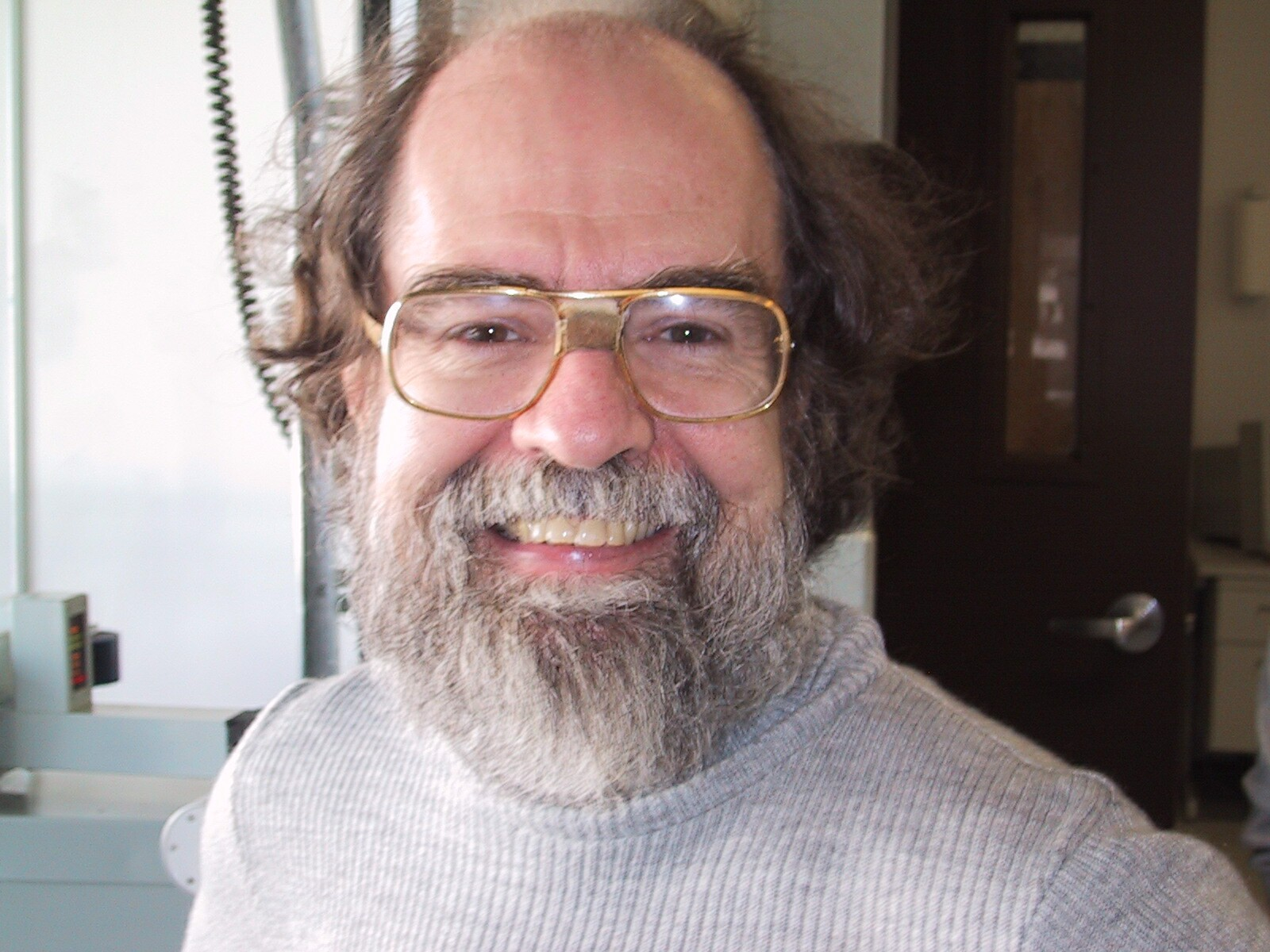
- James E. Gunn (2000 photo)
- Born: October 21, 1938 (age 88); Livingston, Texas
- Education: Rice University; Caltech
- Known for: Gunn–Peterson trough
- Awards: Heineman Prize (1988); Gold Medal of the Royal Astronomical Society (1994); Joseph Weber Award for Astronomical Instrumentation (2002); Crafoord Prize (2005); Gruber Prize (2005); National Medal of Science (2008); Bruce Medal (2013); Kyoto Prize (2019)
- Scientific career
- Fields: Astronomy and Astrophysics
- Workplaces: Princeton University

James Edward Gunn (born October 21, 1938) is the Eugene Higgins Professor of Astronomy at Princeton University. Gunn's early theoretical work in astronomy has helped establish the current understanding of how galaxies form, and the properties of the space between galaxies. He also suggested important observational tests to confirm the presence of dark matter in galaxies, and predicted the existence of a Gunn–Peterson trough in the spectra of distant quasars.

Cosmology may look like a science, but it isn't a science... A basic tenet of science is that you can do repeatable experiments, and you can't do that in cosmology.

— James E. Gunn

Much of Gunn's later work has involved leadership in major observational projects. He developed plans for one of the first uses of digital camera technology for space observation, a project that led to the Sloan Digital Sky Survey, the most extensive three-dimensional mapping of the universe ever undertaken. He also played a major role with the Wide Field and Planetary Camera on the Hubble Space Telescope.

Gunn graduated from A.C. Jones High School in Beeville, Texas in 1957. He earned his bachelor's degree at Rice University in Houston, Texas, in 1961, and his Ph.D. from the California Institute of Technology (Caltech) in 1965. He joined the faculty of Princeton University two years later. Subsequently, he worked at the University of California at Berkeley and Caltech before returning to Princeton. He is married to the astronomer Gillian Knapp and they have two children, Humberto and Marleny Gunn.

== Honors ==
- 1977 – Elected member of the American Academy of Arts and Sciences
- 1977 – Elected member of the National Academy of Sciences
- 1983 – MacArthur Fellow
- 1987 – Distinguished Alumnus Award, Rice University
- 1987 – Elected member of the American Philosophical Society
- 1988 – Heineman Prize
- 1994 – Gold Medal of the Royal Astronomical Society
- 2001 – Petrie Prize, Canadian Astronomical Society
- 2002 – Joseph Weber Award for Astronomical Instrumentation
- 2002 – Distinguished Alumnus Award, California Institute of Technology
- 2005 – Crafoord Prize with James Peebles and Martin Rees
- 2005 – Henry Norris Russell Lectureship of the American Astronomical Society
- 2005 – Gruber Cosmology Prize
- 2006 – Honorary Degree from the University of Portsmouth
- 2008 – National Medal of Science
- 2013 – Bruce Medal of the Astronomical Society of the Pacific
- 2019 – Kyoto Prize in Basic Sciences (Earth and Planetary Sciences, Astronomy and Astrophysics)
