= Peter Goldreich =

American astrophysicist (born 1939)

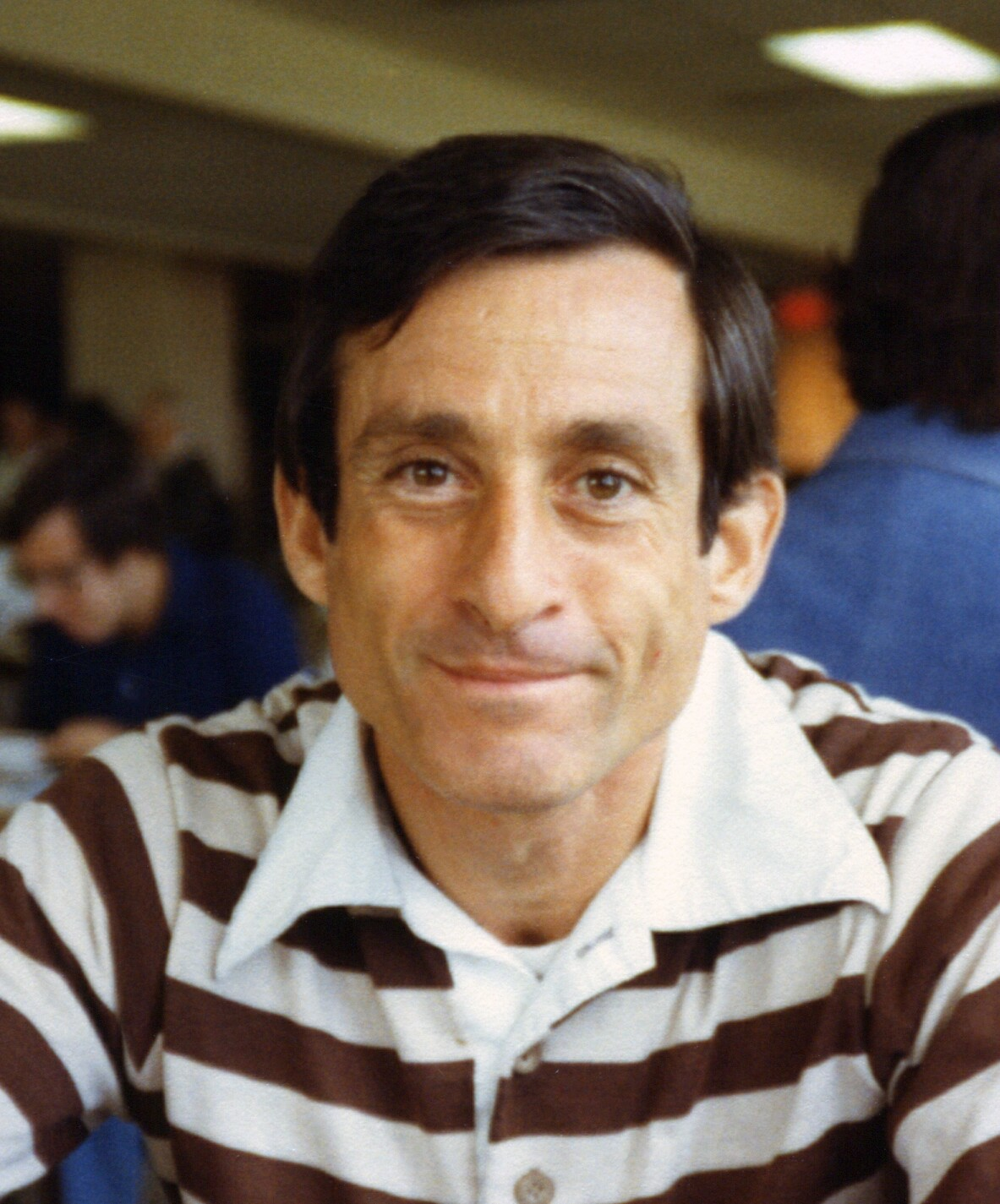
- Peter Goldreich in 1980
- Born: July 14, 1939 (age 87)
- Education: Cornell University
- Known for: Goldreich-Kylafis effect; Goldreich–Julian pulsar charge density; Goldreich–Tremaine density‑wave torque; Goldreich–Tremaine corotation torque; Kuiper‑binary model; Goldreich–Sridhar MHD‑turbulence spectrum
- Awards: Chapman Medal of the Royal Astronomical Society (1985) Brouwer Award (1986); Gold Medal of the Royal Astronomical Society (1993); National Medal of Science (1995) Shaw Prize (2007)
- Scientific career
- Fields: Astronomy and Astrophysics
- Workplaces: Caltech; Institute for Advanced Study
- Doctoral advisor: Thomas Gold
- Doctoral students: Richard McCray; Carolyn Porco; William R. Ward; Jack Wisdom; Yanqin Wu; Eugene Chiang; Charles R. Alcock; Jack Wisdom; Jason Maron

Peter Goldreich (born July 14, 1939) is an American astrophysicist whose research focuses on celestial mechanics, planetary rings, helioseismology and neutron stars. He is the Lee DuBridge Professor of Astrophysics and Planetary Physics at California Institute of Technology. Since 2005 he has also been a professor at the Institute for Advanced Study in Princeton, New Jersey. Asteroid 3805 Goldreich is named after him.

== Career ==
Goldreich received a bachelor of science in engineering physics from Cornell University in 1960, and obtained a Ph.D. from Cornell in 1963 under the supervision of Thomas Gold. In 1963 and 1964 Goldreich was a postdoctoral fellow at Cambridge University. From 1964 to 1966 he was an assistant professor of astronomy and geophysics at UCLA. Goldreich joined the faculty at Caltech in 1966 as an associate professor. He later became a full professor in 1969 while remaining at Caltech, and in 1981 he became the Lee A. DuBridge Professor of Astrophysics & Planetary Physics also at Caltech. He also sits on the Board of Adjudicators for the Shaw Prize, and the selection committee for Astronomy Prizes.

== Scientific accomplishments ==
Goldreich has made a wide range of significant contributions to theoretical astrophysics and planetary sciences. In 1966 Goldreich published a classic paper on the evolution of the Moon's orbit and on the orbits of other moons in the Solar System. He showed that for each planet there is a certain distance such that moons closer to the planet than that distance maintain an almost constant orbital inclination with respect to the planet's equator (with an orbital precession mostly due to the tidal influence of the planet), whereas moons further away maintain an almost constant orbital inclination with respect to the ecliptic (with precession due mostly to the tidal influence of the Sun). The moons in the first category, with the exception of Neptune's moon Triton, orbit near the equatorial plane. He concluded that these moons formed from equatorial accretion disks. But he found that the Moon, although it was once inside the critical distance from the Earth, never had an equatorial orbit as would be expected from various scenarios for its origin. This is called the lunar inclination problem, to which various solutions have since been proposed.

Goldreich and Alar Toomre first described the process of polar wander in a 1969 paper, although evidence of paleomagnetism was not discovered until later. Goldreich collaborated with George Abell to conclude that planetary nebulae evolved from red giant stars, a view that is now widely accepted. In 1979 Goldreich, along with Scott Tremaine predicted that Saturn's F ring was maintained by shepherd moons, a prediction that would be confirmed by observations in 1980. They also predicted that Uranus' rings were held in place by similar shepherd moons, a prediction that was confirmed in 1986. Goldreich, along with Tremaine predicted planetary migration in 1980, which would later be invoked to explain hot jupiters.

In 1969, Goldreich published a paper together with William Julian that is now considered a classic work on pulsar magnetospheres. They provided a simple and compelling model for the structure of magnetic fields anchored in a neutron star and showed that these fields can extract the neutron star rotational energy to power electromagnetic emission. Similar considerations were later used to understand the magnetospheres of rotating black holes.

== Awards and honors ==
- Woodrow Wilson Honorary Fellowship, 1960–1961
- Andrew Dixon White Fellowship, 1960–1961
- National Foundation Fellowship, 1961–1963
- National Academy of Sciences, National Research Council Postdoctoral Fellowship, 1963–1964
- Sloan Foundation Fellowship, 1968–1970
- Elected to National Academy of Sciences, 1972
- Elected to American Academy of Arts and Sciences, 1973
- Henry Norris Russell Lectureship of the American Astronomical Society, 1979
- California Scientist of the Year, 1981
- Chapman Medal of the Royal Astronomical Society, 1985
- Brouwer Award of the Division on Dynamical Astronomy of the American Astronomical Society, 1986
- Amos de Shalit Lecturer at the Weizmann Institute, 1986
- Thomas Gold Lecturer at Cornell University, 1987
- Regents Fellow, Smithsonian Institution, 1988–1990
- Miller Professorship, University of California, Berkeley, 1990
- Gerard P. Kuiper Prize of the Division for Planetary Science, American Astronomical Society, 1992
- Morris Loeb Lecturer, Harvard University, 1992
- Gold Medal of the Royal Astronomical Society, 1993
- Foreign Member of the Royal Society, 2004
- Shaw Prize, 2007

In 1995, Goldreich received the National Medal of Science for "his profound and lasting contributions to planetary sciences and astrophysics, providing fundamental theoretical insights for understanding the rotation of planets, the dynamics of planetary rings, pulsars, astrophysical masers, the spiral arms of galaxies, and the oscillations of the Sun".

Goldreich was awarded the Grande Médaille of the French Academy of Sciences in 2006 for his numerous contributions in the field of Astrophysics.

Goldreich received the 2007 Shaw Prize in Astronomy "in recognition of his lifetime achievements in theoretical astrophysics and planetary sciences".
