= Mark R. Krumholz =

Astronomy and astrophysics professor

- Education: Princeton University, University of California, Berkeley
- Scientific career
- Fields: Astrophysics
- Workplaces: Australian National University
- Doctoral advisor: Christopher F. McKee

Mark R. Krumholz is a professor of astronomy and astrophysics. He currently serves as a professor and ARC Laureate Fellow at the Research School of Astronomy and Astrophysics at the Australian National University.

== Education and early career ==
Krumholz obtained his undergraduate degree from Princeton University in 1997. He then pursued his Ph.D. at the University of California, Berkeley, which he completed in 2004 under the supervision of Christopher F. McKee.

== Awards and honors ==
- National Science Foundation CAREER Award in 2010
- The Helen B. Warner Prize for Astronomy in 2013
- Anne Green Prize in 2019
- Election as a Fellow of the Australian Academy of Science in 2024.
