= Canadian Institute for Theoretical Astrophysics =

Research institute in Toronto, Canada

Coordinates: 43°39′37.25″N 79°23′54.45″W

- Type: Research institute
- Established: 1984
- Affiliations: University of Toronto
- Director: Shantanu Basu
- Location: Toronto, Ontario, Canada
- Website: www.cita.utoronto.ca

The Canadian Institute for Theoretical Astrophysics (CITA) is a national research institute funded by the Natural Sciences and Engineering Research Council, located at the University of Toronto's St. George campus in Toronto, Ontario, Canada. CITA's mission is "to foster interaction within the Canadian theoretical Astrophysics community and to serve as an international center of excellence for theoretical studies in astrophysics." CITA was incorporated in 1984.

CITA has close administrative and academic relations with the Canadian Institute for Advanced Research (CIFAR); several CITA faculty also serve as members of CIFAR.

== History ==
The concept of a nationally supported institute for theoretical astrophysics dates back to discussions within the Canadian Astronomical Society in the early 1980s. A series of committees advocated a model of a university‑based institute governed by a council of Canadian astrophysicists. Proposals were solicited from universities across the country to host this institute, which by now had been named the Canadian Institute for Theoretical Astrophysics/Institut Canadien d'astrophysique theorique (CITA/ICAT). The University of Toronto won the resulting spirited competition, and CITA (University of Toronto) was established as an institute within the School of Graduate Studies in June 1984, with staff consisting of a single professor (Peter G. Martin) as the acting director and a visiting professor from Queen's University (Richard Henriksen) and a temporary administrative assistant. Today there are 9 faculty members two of which are Canada Research Chairs, two administrative staff, a Systems Manager and technical computing staff.

At the same time, Professor Richard Henriksen worked on establishing CITA, Inc. (a separate entity from CITA the institute at the University of Toronto) as an incorporated national institute and charity governed by an elected Council of Canadian astrophysics/relativity professors to promote research in theoretical astrophysics across the country. CITA Council is selected from CITA Inc members. There are presently 55 members of CITA, Inc.

CITA's research activities are supported by the University of Toronto, NSERC, multiple grants by the Ontario and Federal governments, as well as private sponsors including the Simons Foundation and CIFAR.

== Membership ==
CITA has a small number of long-term faculty members, and a larger number of short term (3- or 5-year) postdoctoral positions, as well as an active visitor program; the purpose of the relatively high influx of new researchers or visitors is to ensure that timely topics are well represented at CITA. There are currently approximately 20 postdoctoral researchers at CITA, and 4 full-time administrative and computer staff. Several graduate students in the University of Toronto Department of Astronomy and Astrophysics or Department of Physics work with CITA researchers throughout their graduate work, and typically ten undergraduates come to CITA to work over the summer.

In 1985, Scott D. Tremaine came to CITA as its first director; Margaret Fukunaga was hired as the permanent Business Officer and Dick Bond arrived as the second faculty member. Dick Bond became the director in 1996 and Norman Murray was director 2006–2016.

Since 1984, the directors of the institute have been as follows:

Director	Time
Scott Tremaine	1984–1996
Dick Bond	1996–2006
Norm Murray	2006–2016
Ue-Li Pen	2016–2019
Dick Bond*	2019–2020
Norm Murray*	2020–2021
Juna Kollmeier	2021–2024
Peter Martin*	2024-2025
Shantanu Basu*	2025-

* Denotes interim directors.

Notable past and present faculty members of CITA also include:

- Peter G. Martin, 1984–present
- Scott Tremaine, 1985–1997, 2020–present
- Dick Bond, 1985–present
- Nick Kaiser, 1988–1997
- Norm Murray, 1993–present
- Lev Kofman, 1998–2009
- Ue-Li Pen, 1998–present
- Chris Thompson, 2000–present
- Roman Rafikov, 2005–2007
- Harald Pfeiffer, 2009–2018
- Daniel Green, 2014–2015
- Juna Kollmeier, 2021-2024
- Maya Fishbach, 2022-present
- Reed Essick, 2022-present
- Bart Ripperda, 2022-present
- Pratika Dayal, 2025-present
- Anupam Mazumdar, 2026-present
- Sara Seager, 2026-present

== Research ==
CITA has active research programs in cosmology (particularly in studies of the cosmic microwave background and intensity mapping), early universe studies and cosmic inflation, neutron stars (especially scintillometry and magnetars), fast radio burst, active galaxies, star formation, planet formation, gravitational waves and plasma astrophysics.

== See also ==
- Algonquin 46m radio telescope
- Algonquin Radio Observatory
- Dominion Astrophysical Observatory
- Dominion Radio Astrophysical Observatory
- Herzberg Institute of Astrophysics
