= Marla Geha =

American astronomer

Marla C. Geha is an American astronomer who specializes in dwarf galaxies, and especially the satellite galaxies of the Milky Way. She is a professor of astronomy and physics at Yale University, and director of telescope resources for Yale.

== Education and career ==
Geha grew up wanting to be an astronaut after seeing the launch of the first Space Shuttle, and shifted her interests to astronomy in high school as a more realistic career path. She majored in applied and engineering physics as an undergraduate at Cornell University, graduating with a bachelor's degree in 1995. She earned a master's degree in astronomy in 1998 from New Mexico State University, but, dissatisfied with the program, left before completing a Ph.D. After a brief stint at the Lawrence Berkeley National Laboratory, she reapplied to graduate schools, and went to the University of California, Santa Cruz for a Ph.D., which she completed in 2003. Her dissertation, Internal dynamics, structure and formation of dwarf elliptical galaxies, was jointly supervised by Puragra (Raja) GuhaThakurta and Roeland van der Marel.

After postdoctoral research as a Hubble Postdoctoral Fellow at the Carnegie Observatories, and as a Plaskett Postdoctoral Fellow at the NRC Herzberg Astronomy and Astrophysics Research Centre and Dominion Radio Astrophysical Observatory in Canada, she joined the Yale University faculty as an assistant professor in 2008. She was promoted to associate professor in 2012 and full professor in 2014.

She has been director of Yale Telescope Resources since 2012. In 2017, she was given a Howard Hughes Medical Institute professorship, funding a five-year program for science education of military veterans. Geha offers a popular, free online course called "Rocket Science for Everyone".

== Recognition ==
Geha was awarded a Guggenheim Fellowship in 2015. She was a keynote speaker at the 2021 meeting of the American Astronomical Society. Geha was named a Howard Hughes Medical Institute Professor in 2018. She is described by students as being "the perfect Professor" and received the Dylan Hixon Prize for teaching from Yale University.
