= HD 163840 =

Star in the constellation Hercules

Observation data Epoch J2000 Equinox ICRS
- Constellation: Hercules
- Right ascension: 17^{h} 57^{m} 14.33667^{s}
- Declination: +23° 59′ 44.5562″
- Apparent magnitude (V): 6.4543±0.0005 (6.30 + 7.90)

Characteristics
- Spectral type: G2 V + K2 V
- B−V color index: 0.642±0.006

Astrometry
Radial velocity (R_{v})	−32.83±0.07 km/s
Proper motion (μ)	RA: −17.79±0.33 mas/yr Dec.: +73.56±0.47 mas/yr
Parallax (π)	35.40±0.62 mas
Distance	92 ± 2 ly (28.2 ± 0.5 pc)
Absolute magnitude (M_{V})	4.05

Orbit
Period (P)	881.628±0.064 d
Semi-major axis (a)	80.64 mas
Eccentricity (e)	0.4165±0.0010
Inclination (i)	72.83±0.47°
Longitude of the node (Ω)	175.32±0.44°
Periastron epoch (T)	55650.39 ± 0.38 (BJD−2400000)
Argument of periastron (ω) (secondary)	135.46±0.16°

Details

HD 163840 A
Mass	1.132±0.014 M_{☉}
Luminosity	2.031 L_{☉}
Temperature	5,860 K
Metallicity [Fe/H]	0.06 dex
Age	7.4 Gyr

HD 163840 B
Mass	0.7421±0.0073 M_{☉}
Luminosity	0.648 L_{☉}
Temperature	4,780 K

Other designations
- BD+24°3283, GJ 4039, HD 163840, HIP 87895, HR 6697, SAO 85575, WDS J17572+2400A, Wolf 777

Database references
SIMBAD	data

HD 163840 is a binary star system in the northern constellation of Hercules. It has a combined apparent visual magnitude of 6.45, which falls just below the brightness level that is visible to the naked eye for people with normal eyesight. An annual parallax shift of 35.40 mas provides a distance estimate of about 92 light years. The system is moving closer to the Sun with a radial velocity of −33 km/s. In about 769,000 years, it will make perihelion at a separation of around 27.2 ly (8.33 pc).

R. K. Young of the Dominion Astrophysical Observatory was the first to recognize the variable radial velocity of this system. In 1974, Harold A. McAlister and Philip A. Ianna identified it as a nearby G-type dwarf based on its spectroscopic properties. McAlister et al. (1974) found it to be a spectroscopic binary and the components were first resolved in 1976. A series of observations since that time allowed the system's orbital elements to be published by McAlister et al. (1995), along with estimates of the stellar masses of the two components. These parameters have been further refined using improved instruments up through 2016.

The pair of stars orbit each other with a period of 881.6 days (2.414 a) and an eccentricity of 0.417. The plane of their orbit is inclined by an angle of 73° to the line of sight from the Earth, with a semimajor axis having an angular value of 80.64 mas. The close, eccentric orbit of the pair does not permit a stable planetary orbit in the habitable zone of either component.

The primary, component A, is a magnitude 6.30 G-type main-sequence star with a stellar classification of G2 V. It has 1.13 times the mass of the Sun and is radiating double the Sun's luminosity from its photosphere at an effective temperature of 5,860 K. Component B, the magnitude 7.90 secondary, is a smaller K-type main-sequence star with a class of K2 V. It has 0.74 times the Sun's mass and shines with 0.65 times the Sun's luminosity at an effective temperature of 4,780 K. The system as a whole may be around 7.4 billion years old with a slightly higher metallicity than the Sun. The system displays solar-like variability.
