= Kavan Ratnatunga =

Sri Lankan scholar

- Born: Sri Lanka
- Education: Australian National University; University of Pittsburgh; University of Ceylon, Colombo; Royal College Colombo
- Employer(s): Institute for Advanced Study 1984/86; Dominion Astrophysical Observatory 1986/87; NASA Goddard Space Flight Center1989/91; Space Telescope Science Institute 1992; Johns Hopkins University 1992/96; Carnegie Mellon University 1996/2004
- Website: www.lakdiva.org

Kavan Ratnatunga is a Sri Lankan scholar, with interests in astronomy, archaeology and numismatics.

== Education ==
Kavan Ratnatunga went to school at Royal College, Colombo, Ceylon. In 1976 from the University of Ceylon, Colombo, he was awarded a first-class BSc Honours Degree in Physics. In 1979 he obtained a MS from University of Pittsburgh in USA, and in 1983 a PhD from Australian National University, specializing in automated statistical analysis of astronomical data and digital images.

== Career ==
Ratnatunga's career included research at Institute for Advanced Study in Princeton, Dominion Astrophysical Observatory in Victoria Canada, NASA Goddard Space Flight Center in Greenbelt (1989/91), Space Telescope Science Institute and Johns Hopkins University in Baltimore (1992/96), and Carnegie Mellon University in Pittsburgh (1996/2004).

He returned to Sri Lanka in 2005. His current interests include increasing the information on Lanka on the Internet; archaeology with a special interest in numismatics; and rare books on Lanka. At the Post Graduate Institute of Archaeology in 2010, he obtained a Diploma in Museology.

== Current activities ==
He is vice president of the Sri Lanka Numismatic Society, and the Archaeological Society of Sri Lanka. He is ex-co member of the Internet Society of Sri Lanka and the Royal Asiatic Society of Sri Lanka. He is a Trustee of the National Trust of Sri Lanka. He is a life member of the Sri Lanka Rationalist Association, the Sri Lanka Philatelic Society, and the Sri Lanka Association for the Advancement of Science of which he was the Chairman, Committee for the Popularization of Science in 2007. He is President of the Sri Lanka Astronomical Association. He is member of the International Astronomical Union (IAU), on behalf of which he was the chairman of the International Year of Astronomy IYA2009 committee for Sri Lanka.

He writes freelance for the Sunday Times of Sri Lanka. He was a visiting Lecturer on Astronomy (DE1412) at the University of Moratuwa at Katubedda.

== Publications ==
His 50 publications in refereed Journals include the first in-situ sample of field halo K giants in the galactic halo (1983), and the first quadruple gravitational lens discovered with the NASA Hubble Space Telescope (1995).
