= Observatory Hill =

Observatory Hill is the name of several hills around the world including:

- Observatory Hill, Darjeeling, in West Bengal, India
- Observatory Hill, Hong Kong
- Observatory Hill (Pittsburgh), a neighborhood in Pittsburgh, Pennsylvania
- Observatory Hill (Saanich), British Columbia, Canada, site of the Dominion Astrophysical Observatory
- Observatory Hill (Virginia), formerly known as Mount Jefferson
- Observatory Hill (Washington, D.C.), site of the United States Naval Observatory
- Observatory Park, Sydney, New South Wales, Australia, also known as Observatory Hill
- Tähtitorninvuori ("Observatory Hill"), a hill and park in Helsinki, Finland
