= NRC Herzberg Astronomy and Astrophysics Research Centre =

Canadian centre for astronomy and astrophysics

Coordinates: 48.5200°N 123.41844°W

NRC Herzberg
- NRC Herzberg Astronomy and Astrophysics Research Centre
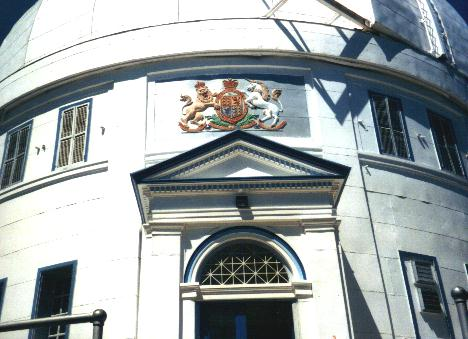
- Front of the Plaskett Telescope Dominion Astrophysical Observatory
- Named after: Gerhard Herzberg
- Founded at: Ottawa, Canada
- Location: Victoria, Canada
- Owner: Government of Canada
- Director-General: Luc Simard
- Website: astroherzberg.org
- Formerly called: NRC Herzberg Institute of Astrophysics (NRC-HIA)

The NRC Herzberg Astronomy and Astrophysics Research Centre (NRC Herzberg, HAA) is the leading Canadian centre for astronomy and astrophysics. It is based in Victoria, British Columbia. The current director-general, as of 2021, is Luc Simard.

== History ==
Named for the Nobel laureate Gerhard Herzberg, it was formed in 1975 as part of the National Research Council of Canada in Ottawa, Ontario. The NRC-HIA headquarters were moved to Victoria, British Columbia in 1995 to the site of the Dominion Astrophysical Observatory. In 2012, the organization was restructured and renamed NRC Herzberg Astronomy and Astrophysics.

== Facilities ==
NRC-HAA also operates the Dominion Radio Astrophysical Observatory outside of Penticton, British Columbia and the Canadian Astronomy Data Centre as well as managing Canadian involvement in the Canada-France-Hawaii Telescope, Gemini Observatory, Atacama Large Millimeter Array, the Square Kilometre Array, and the Thirty Meter Telescope, as well as Canada's national astronomy data centre.

- The institute is also involved in the development and construction of instruments and telescopes.
- Members of NRC-HAA are currently involved in The Next Generation Virgo Cluster Survey.
- Members of NRC-HAA are currently involved with Pan-Andromeda Archaeological Survey.

== Plaskett Fellowship ==
The Plaskett Fellowship is named after John Stanley Plaskett and is awarded to an outstanding, recent doctoral graduate in astrophysics or a closely related discipline. Fellows conduct independent research in a stimulating, collegial environment at the Dominion Astrophysical Observatory in Victoria, British Columbia, Canada. Expertise in observational astrophysics is the norm, but some theoreticians were also among this distinguished group of astronomers.

Past Plaskett Fellows
Name	Dates	Current Position
Brown, Toby	2021–2024	Astronomer, NRC-HAA
Marshall, Madeline	2020–2024	Oppenheimer Distinguished Postdoctoral Fellow, Los Alamos
Woods, Tyrone	2019–2023	Assistant Professor, University of Manitoba
Hénault-Brunet, Vincent	2017–2019	Assistant Professor, Saint Mary's University
Ngo, Henry	2017–2019	Data and Analytics Lead, Office of the Provincial Health Officer, BC Ministry of Health
Lawler, Samantha	2014–2019	Assistant Professor, University of Regina
McConnell, Nick	2014–2016	STEM Workforce Development and Education Manager, ISEE
Roediger, Joel	2013–2016	Astronomer, NRC-HAA
Kirk, Helen	2012–2015	Astronomer, NRC-HAA
Fraser, Wesley	2011–2014	Astronomer, NRC-HAA
Mann, Rita	2010–2015	Astronomer, Victoria
Schnee, Scott	2009–2010	System Director, The Aerospace Corporation
McConnachie, Alan	2008–2011	Instrumentation Astronomer, NRC-HAA
Peng, Chien-Yi	2007–2010	Scientific Programmer, Giant Magellan Telescope
Geha, Marla	2006–2007	Professor, Astronomy, Yale University
Puzia, Thomas H.	2006–2010	Associate Professor, Department of Astronomy and Astrophysics, Pontificia Universidad Católica de Chile
Onken, Chris	2005–2008	Research Fellow, Research School of Astronomy and Astrophysics, The Australian National University
Peng, Eric	2004–2007	Faculty Research Fellow, Department of Astronomy, Peking University
Matthews, Brenda	2004–2008	Astronomer, Millimetre Astronomy Group, NRC-HAA
Fiege, Jason	2002–2004	Associate Professor, Physics and Astronomy, University of Manitoba
Willott, Christopher	2002–2006	Astronomer, Canadian Astronomy Data Centre, NRC-HAA
Johnson, Jennifer	2002–2005	Professor, Department of Astronomy, Ohio State University
Sawicki, Marcin	2001–2004	Chair of Astronomy & Physics, Astronomy and Physics, St Mary's University
Barton, Elizabeth	1999–2001	Founder & CEO at Infiniscape Incorporated
van Zee, Liese	1999–2001	Professor, Astronomy, University of Indiana
Fulbright, Jon	1999–2002	GOES-R Product Readiness and Operations (PRO) Deputy and Product Quality Lead, Arctic Slope Technical Services
Côté, Stéphanie	1997–1999	Group Leader, Canadian Gemini Office NRC-HAA
Lavezzi, Tracey Ellen	1997–1999	Los Alamos National Laboratory
Courteau, Stéphane	1996–1999	Professor, Department of Physics, Engineering Physics and Astronomy, Queen's University
Côté, Patrick	1994–1997	Principal Research Officer, NRC-HAA
Marzke, Ronald	1994–1997	Associate Dean of College of Science & Engineering, San Francisco State University
Smecker-Hane, Tammy	1992–1995	Associate Professor, Physics and Astronomy, University of California Irvine
Garnavich, Peter	1991–1994	Professor, Astrophysics / Cosmology Physics, Notre Dame University
Riegler, Michael	1991–1993	Program Manager, Word Business Unit, Microsoft Corporation
Abraham, Roberto	1991–1994	Professor, Department of Physics and Astronomy, University of Toronto
Ellingson, Erica	1989–1992	Associate Professor, Astronomy and Planetary Sciences, University of Colorado at Boulder
Friel, Eileen	1988–1990	Professor Emerita, University of Indiana
Pierce, Michael	1988–1991	Professor, University of Wyoming
Bolte, Michael	1987–1990	Professor, Astronomy and Astrophysics, Lick Observatory
Welch, Douglas	1986–1988	Vice-Provost and Dean of Graduate Studies, McMaster University
Ratnatunga, Kavan	1986–1988	Senior Research Scientist, Carnegie-Mellon University
Westpfahl, David	1986–1988	Professor, Department of Physics, New Mexico Institute of Mining and Technology
Crabtree, Dennis	1986–1988	Astronomer, NRC-HAA
Durand, Daniel	1986–1989	Retired, former Research Council Officer, NRC-HAA
Smith, Graeme	1984–1986	Professor, Astronomy and Astrophysics, Lick Observatory
Stauffer, John	1984–1986	Research Scientist, Spitzer Science Centre
Stetson, Peter	1983–1984	Retired, former Principal Research Officer, NRC-HAA
Campbell, Bruce	1983–1987	Financial consultant
Olszewski, Edward	1982–1984	Astronomer, Steward Observatory
Yee, Howard	1982–1984	Professor, Department of Astronomy and Astrophysics, University of Toronto
Stryker, Linda	1981–1983	Emeritus Professor, Arizona State University
Massey, Philip	1980–1983	Astronomer, Lowell Observatory
Mochnacki, Stefan	1980–1982	Retired, professor, Department of Astronomy and Astrophysics, University of Toronto
Harris, Hugh	1980–1982	Astronomer, U.S. Naval Observatory
Quintana, Hernán	1979–1981	Professor, Department of Astronomy (former Chair), Pontificia Universidad Católica de Chile
Pritchet, Christopher	1978–1981	Retired, professor, Department of Physics and Astronomy (former Chair), University of Victoria
Lawrie, David	1978–1980	Director, Sensing and Exploitation Department, Aerospace Corporation
Poeckert, Roland	1977–1979	Unknown
Rucinski, Slavek	1975–1977	Retired, formerly professor, Department of Astronomy and Astrophysics and Associate Director, David Dunlap Observatory, University of Toronto

== Covington Fellowship ==
The Covington Fellowship is named after Arthur Covington and is awarded to an outstanding, recent doctoral graduate in astrophysics or a closely related discipline. Fellows conduct independent research in a stimulating, collegial environment at the institute at the Dominion Radio Astrophysical Observatory in Penticton, BC. DRAO staff expertise is in observational radio astronomy and the development of instrumentation and technology for radio telescopes. Current and past Covington Fellows are:

Covington Fellows
Name	Dates	Current Position
Jennifer West	2023–present	Covington Fellow, Dominion Radio Astrophysical Observatory, NRC-HAA
Mehrnoosh Tahani	2019–2022	Banting Fellow, Kavli Institute for Particle Astrophysics and Cosmology, Stanford University
Trey Wenger	2019–2022	NSF Fellow, Department of Astronomy, University of Wisconsin-Madison
Paul Scholz	2016–2019	Dunlap Fellow, Department of Astronomy and Astrophysics, University of Toronto
Timothy Robishaw	2011–2013	Senior Research Officer, Dominion Radio Astrophysical Observatory, NRC-HAA
Maik Wolleben	2008–2011	Founder, Skaha Remote Sensing

== See also ==
- Atacama Large Millimeter Array
- Canada–France–Hawaii Telescope
- Dominion Radio Astrophysical Observatory
- Gemini Observatory
- James Clerk Maxwell Telescope
- Square Kilometre Array
- Thirty Meter Telescope
- James Webb Space Telescope
