= Photon underproduction crisis =

Discrepancy between predicted and observed photon amounts

The photon underproduction crisis is a cosmological discussion concerning the purported deficit between observed photons and predicted photons.

The deficit, or underproduction crisis, is a theoretical problem, arising from comparing observations of ultraviolet light emitted from known populations of galaxies and quasars to theoretical predictions of the amount of ultraviolet light required to simulate the observed distribution of the hydrogen gas in the local universe in a cosmological simulation. The distribution of hydrogen gas was inferred using Lyman-alpha forest observations from Hubble Space Telescope's Cosmic Origins Spectrograph. The amount of light from galaxies and quasars can be estimated from its effect on the distribution of hydrogen and helium in the regions between galaxies. Highly energetic ultraviolet photons can convert electrically neutral hydrogen gas into ionized gas.

A team led by Juna Kollmeier reported an unexpected deficit of roughly 400% between ionizing light from known sources and the actual observations of intergalactic hydrogen. Kollmeier and her team wrote in their scientific report, "We examine the statistics of the low-redshift Lyman-alpha forest from smoothed particle hydrodynamic simulations in light of recent improvements in the estimated evolution of the cosmic ultraviolet background (UVB) and recent observations from the Cosmic Origins Spectrograph (COS). We find that the value of the metagalactic photoionization rate required by our simulations to match the observed properties of the low-redshift Lyman-alpha forest is a factor of 5 larger than the value predicted by state of the art models for the evolution of this quantity." Cosmological simulations start at very high cosmological redshift z (such as z=100 or larger) and are evolved to z=0.

According to Benjamin D. Oppenheimer, who is one of the report's coauthors, "The simulations fit the data beautifully in the early universe, and they fit the local data beautifully if we're allowed to assume that this extra light is really there. It's possible the simulations do not reflect reality, which by itself would be a surprise, because intergalactic hydrogen is the component of the Universe that we think we understand the best." Kollmeier and her team state that "... either conventional sources of ionizing photons (galaxies and quasars) must contribute considerably more than current observational estimates or our theoretical understanding of the low-redshift universe is in need of substantial revision." A similar study, led by Michael Shull, found that the deficit is only twice as large and not five times larger, as previously claimed.

A potential resolution to the photon underproduction crisis is presented by a series of recent papers. Khaire & Srianand showed that a metagalactic photoionization rate that is two to five times larger can be easily obtained using updated quasar and galaxy observations. Recent observations of quasars indicate that the quasar contribution to ultraviolet photons is twice that of previous estimates. The revised galaxy contribution is also three times higher. Furthermore, the Kollmeier GADGET-2 simulations did not include heating from active galactic nuclei (AGN) feedback. Including AGN feedback was shown to be an important element for heating in the low redshift intergalactic medium (IGM) (Gurvich, Burkhart, & Bird 2016.). This implies that the low redshift COS data can be used to calibrate AGN feedback models in cosmological simulations.

== See also ==
- Diffuse extragalactic background radiation
