= Dick Bond (astrophysicist) =

Canadian astrophysicist and cosmologist

John Bond
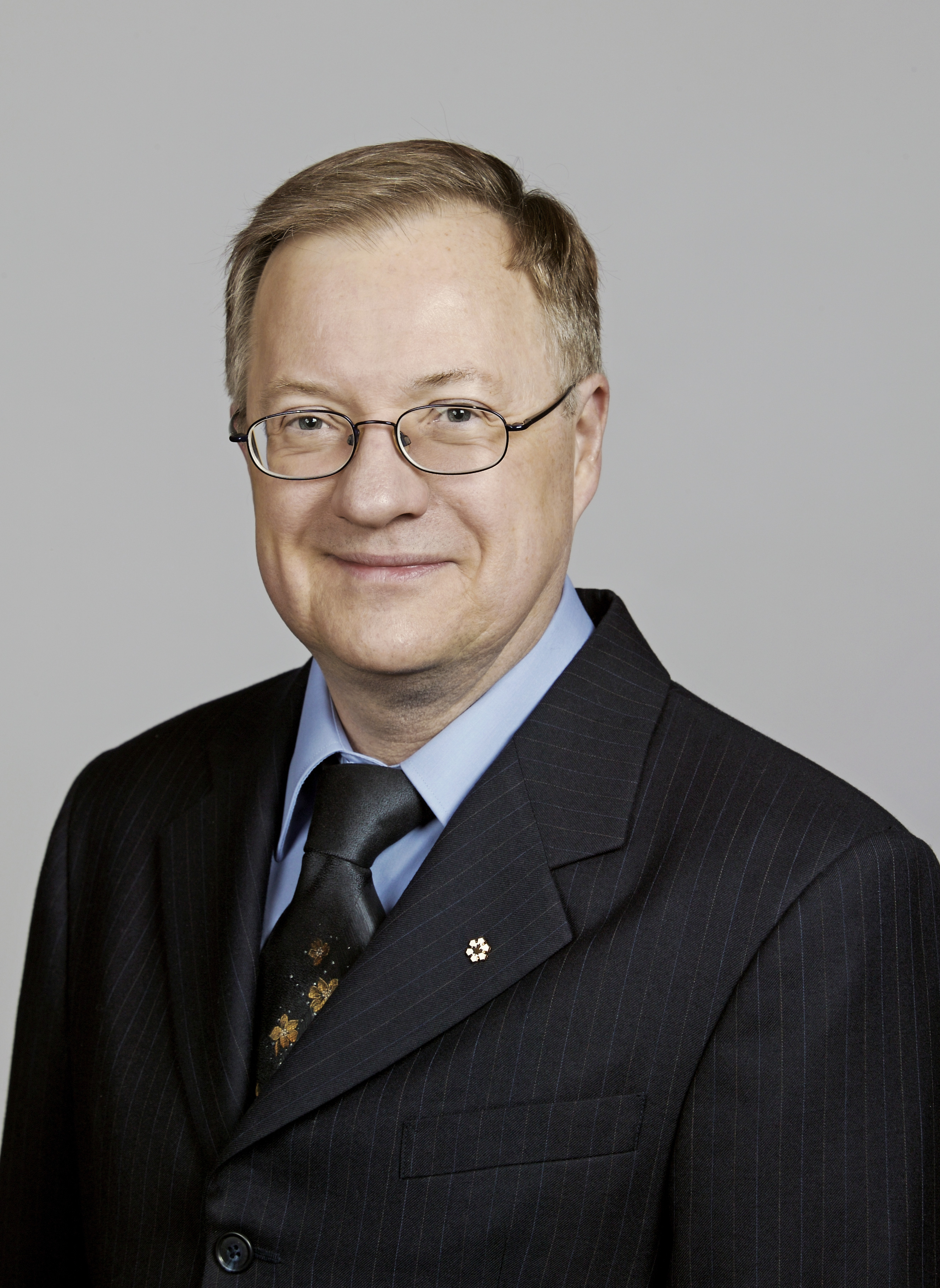
- Born: 1950 (age 75–76); Toronto, Ontario, Canada
- Education: University of Toronto (BA), California Institute of Technology (PhD)
- Scientific career
- Fields: astrophysicist
- Workplaces: University of Toronto

John Richard Bond OC OOnt FRS FRSC (born 1950), also known as J. Richard Bond, is a Canadian astrophysicist and cosmologist. Bond received his bachelor's degree in 1973 from the University of Toronto and his PhD in theoretical physics in 1979 from Caltech under the supervision of William Fowler. Beginning in 1985 he has been a professor at the Canadian Institute for Theoretical Astrophysics (CITA) and at the University of Toronto. He served 2 five-year terms (1996–2006) as CITA's director, and since 2002 he has been the director of the Cosmology and Gravity Program for the Canadian Institute for Advanced Research (CIFAR).

Bond's most famous work concerns the theoretical modeling of anisotropies of the cosmic background radiation. Since the 1990s, increasingly detailed measurements of such anisotropies have enabled such theoretical models to form a basis for understanding the foundations of contemporary cosmology and the evolution of cosmic structure.

== Honours and awards ==
- 1969 space award
- 1989 Steacie Prize
- 1996 FRSC
- 1996 Beals Award, Canadian Astronomical Society
- 1998 CAP-CRM Prize in Theoretical and Mathematical Physics
- 2001 FRS
- 2002 Dannie Heineman Prize for Astrophysics
- 2005 Officer in the Order of Canada
- 2006 Gerhard Herzberg Canada Gold Medal for Science and Engineering
- 2007 Killam Award
- 2008 Gruber Prize in Cosmology
- 2009 Tory Medal
- 2020 Elected a Legacy Fellow of the American Astronomical Society in 2020
- 2025 Shaw Prize in Astronomy
