= Marilyn Tremaine =

American computer scientist

Marilyn Mantei Tremaine
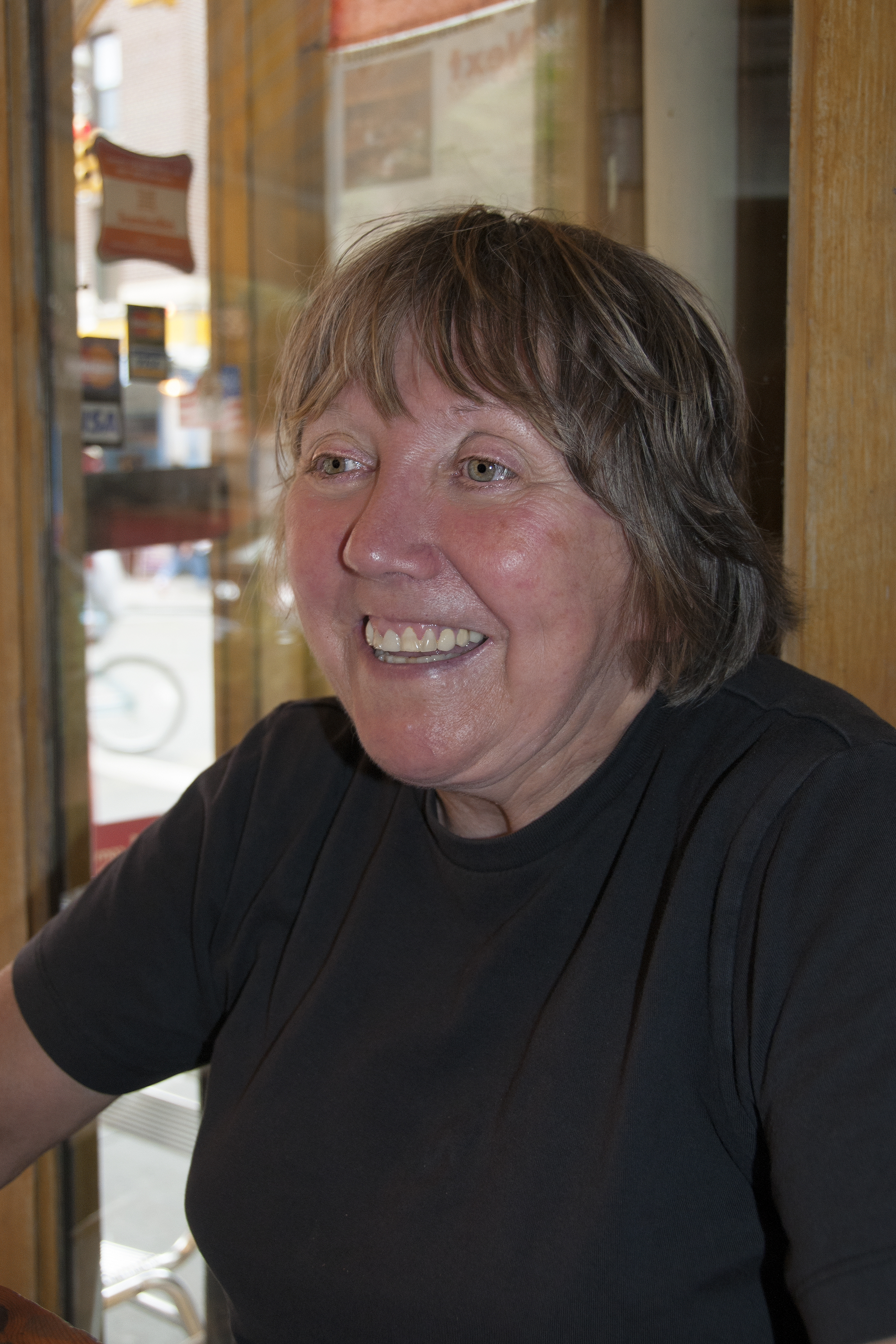
- Education: University of Wisconsin; University of Southern California
- Occupation: Computer scientist
- Known for: Human–computer interaction - Computer-supported cooperative work
- Spouse: Scott Tremaine

Marilyn Mantei Tremaine is an American computer scientist. She is an expert in human–computer interaction and considered a pioneer of the field.

== Education ==
Tremaine received a BS in mathematics, physics and French from the University of Wisconsin, and later in 1982 obtained a PhD in communication theory at the University of Southern California - with the last two years of her PhD spent at Carnegie Mellon University under the direction of Professor Allen Newell.

== Awards ==
Marilyn Tremaine received the ACM SIGCHI Lifetime Service Award in 2005, the Canadian Human Computer Communications Society 2010 Achievement Award, the Usability Professionals Association 2010 Lifetime Achievement Award. In 2022, Tremaine was elected into the ACM CHI Academy.

== Professional career ==
Tremaine's academic career started as a lecturer and later assistant professor in the University of Michigan Business School, then in 1988 she became associate professor in the Computer Science Department of the University of Toronto, Canada, and a part of the Dynamic Graphics Project. In 1997, she returned to the US. She joined Drexel University as Professor of Computer and Information Systems. In 2001, she joined the New Jersey Institute of Technology where she was a professor and chair of the Information Systems Department. In 2008, she was a research professor at Rutgers University with joint appointments in the College of Communication and Information and the Department of Electrical and Computer Engineering. She is currently teaching as an adjunct professor at the University of Toronto.

Tremaine is a distinguished alumni of the University of Toronto Knowledge Media Design Institute. Tremaine has also been vice president of product development for three software startup companies and a senior research scientist at the EDS Center for Applied Research.

Tremaine co-founded ACM SIGCHI. She was the president of SIGCHI from 1999 to 2002, and served as SIGCHI's vice-president of communications, finance, and conference planning. Tremaine served on six editorial boards for journals and received two university teaching awards.

Tremaine is known for psychology studies of early interactive user interfaces, collaborative software, and for developing a framework for cost-justifying usability engineering. Other research interests include auditory and multimodal interface design, global software development, and the development of interfaces for the blind and visually impaired, people with Aphasia, or in rehabilitation following a stroke.

Tremaine has developed educational programs in HCI and related fields, such as the Master of Business and Science on User Experience Design at Rudgers University. In addition, she helped develop SIGCHI's Human-Computer Interaction curriculum resources.

== Personal life ==
Marilyn Tremaine resides in Toronto, Canada, and is married to the astrophysicist Scott Tremaine. Marilyn Tremaine enjoys cooking and catering formal dinners.

== Bibliography ==
- Zhang, Ping; Carey, Jane; Te'eni, Dov; Mantei, Marilyn M. (2005). "Integrating human-computer interaction development into the systems development life cycle: A methodology". Communications of the Association for Information Systems. 15 (1): 29. doi:10.17705/1CAIS.01529.
- Velez, Maria C.; Silver, Deborah; Mantei, Marilyn M. (2005). "Understanding Visualization through Spatial Ability Differences". VIS 05. IEEE Visualization, 2005. pp. 511–518. doi:10.1109/VISUAL.2005.1532836. ISBN 0-7803-9462-3.
- Jack, David; Rares Boian, Alma S.; Mantei, Marilyn M.; Burdea, Grigore C.; Adamovich, Sergei; Recce, Michael; Poizner, Howard (2001). "Virtual reality-enhanced stroke rehabilitation". IEEE Transactions on Neural Systems and Rehabilitation Engineering. 9 (3): 308–318. doi:10.1109/7333.948460. PMID 11561668. S2CID 7903041.
- Mantei, Marilyn M. (1991). "Introduction to the Special Issue on Computer Supported Cooperative Work". ACM SIGCHI Bulletin. 23 (3): 21. doi:10.1145/126505.1047730. ISSN 0736-6906.
- Mayhew, D.; Mantei, M. (1994). "A Basic Framework for Cost-justifying Usability Engineering". In Bias, R. G.; Mayhew, D. J. (eds.). Cost-justifying usability. Boston: Academic Press. ISBN 0-12-095810-4. OCLC 29183594.
- Mantei, M. M. (1989-01-02). "An HCI continuing education curriculum for industry". ACM SIGCHI Bulletin. 20 (3): 16–18. doi:10.1145/67900.67902. ISSN 0736-6906.
- Mantei, Marilyn M.; Hewett, Thomas (1991). "Report on the interact '90 workshop on education in HCI: transcending disciplinary and national boundaries". ACM SIGCHI Bulletin. 23 (2): 40–45. doi:10.1145/122488.122494. ISSN 0736-6906. S2CID 19224779.
- Mantei, M. and Gey, F. Keyword Access to a Mass Storage Device at the Record Level. Proceedings of the International Conference on Very Large Data Bases, Boston, MA, 1975.
