= Scott Tremaine =

Canadian astrophysicist

- Born: Scott Duncan Tremaine; 1950 (age 75–76); Toronto, Ontario
- Citizenship: Canada
- Education: McMaster University; Princeton University (PhD)
- Known for: Theory of galactic dynamics
- Spouse: Marilyn Tremaine
- Scientific career
- Fields: Astrophysics
- Workplaces: Institute for Advanced Study; University of Toronto; Canadian Institute for Theoretical Astrophysics; Princeton University

Scott Duncan Tremaine (born 1950) is a Canadian-born astrophysicist. He is a fellow of the Royal Society of London, the Royal Society of Canada and the National Academy of Sciences. Tremaine is widely regarded as one of the world's leading astrophysicists for his contributions to the theory of Solar System and galactic dynamics. Tremaine is the namesake of asteroid 3806 Tremaine. He is credited with coining the name "Kuiper belt".

== Career ==
He obtained a bachelor's degree at McMaster University in 1971, and a PhD from Princeton University in 1975. He further received an honorary PhD from McMaster University in 1996. He was an associate professor at the Massachusetts Institute of Technology from 1981 to 1985. He became the first director of the Canadian Institute for Theoretical Astrophysics at the University of Toronto in 1986, a position he held until the end of his ten-year term in 1996. He gained the rare distinction of "University Professor" at the University of Toronto in 1995. In 1997, he left CITA and took up a position as a professor at Princeton University, becoming chair of the Astrophysical Sciences department from 1998 to 2006.

Scott Tremaine is currently a professor at the Institute for Advanced Study, for which he left Princeton University in 2007, being replaced as department chair by David Spergel. He has been married to Prof. Marilyn Mantei Tremaine for more than two decades, an expert in human-computer interaction who is the past chair of the SIGCHI section of the Association for Computing Machinery.

== Scientific accomplishments ==
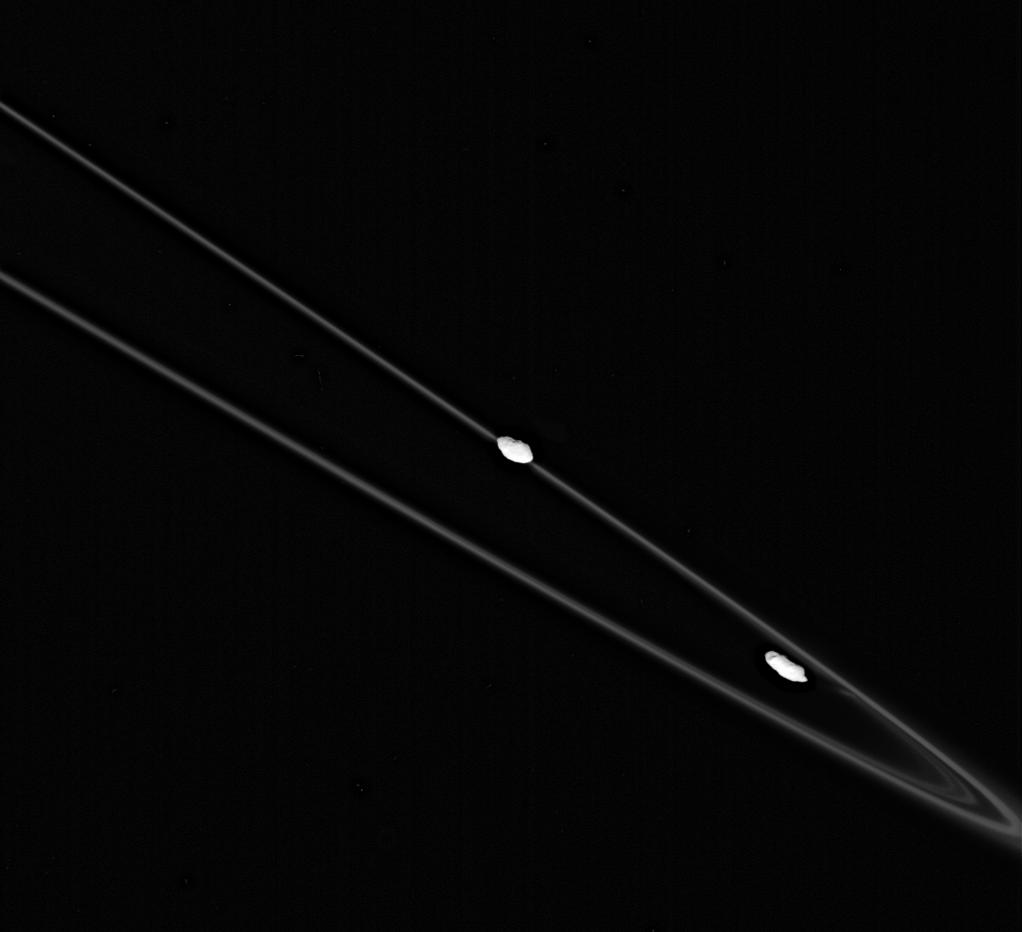
Pandora and Prometheus shepherding Saturn's F ring, as predicted by Goldreich and Tremaine

Tremaine, along with Peter Goldreich, correctly predicted that shepherd moons created Saturn's thin F ring, as well as the thin rings of Uranus in 1979. The Saturnian moons Prometheus and Pandora were first observed in 1981 and shepherding moons were found around Uranus' rings in 1986. Tremaine cowrote the book Galactic Dynamics with James Binney, which is often regarded as the standard reference in the field and has been cited more than three thousand times in scholarly publications. Tremaine, along with collaborators at the University of Toronto, showed that short period comets originate in the Kuiper belt. Tremaine is credited with suggesting that the apparent "double nucleus" of the Andromeda Galaxy was in fact a single ring of old red stars.

== Awards and honours ==
In 2020, he was elected a Legacy Fellow of the American Astronomical Society.

In 2013, he won the Tomalla Foundation Prize for his work on gravitational dynamics.

In 2010, he received an honorary doctorate from the University of Toronto "in recognition of his scholarly contributions to the field of astrophysics, and his administrative leadership in support of Canadian and international science".

In 2005, he won the Research Award from the Alexander von Humboldt Foundation.

In 2002, he was elected to membership in the National Academy of Sciences.

In 1999, Tremaine also received an honorary Doctor of Science degree from St. Mary's University.

In 1998, he won the Dirk Brouwer Award which is awarded by the Division of Dynamical Astronomy of the American Astronomical Society "in recognition of his many outstanding contributions to a wide range of dynamical problems in both solar-system and galactic dynamics."

In 1997, he was awarded the Dannie Heineman Prize for Astrophysics for "diverse and insightful applications of dynamics to planets, rings, comets, galaxies and the universe."

In 1996, he was awarded an honorary Doctor of Science award by McMaster University.

In 1994, Tremaine became a Fellow of the Royal Society of London and also of the Royal Society of Canada.

In 1990, he was awarded the Rutherford Memorial Medal in Physics by the Academies of Arts, Humanities and Sciences of Canada for "his outstanding contributions to the field to [sic] astrophysics, particularly his spectacular success in predicting the properties of planetary ring dynamics and the extraplanetary objects that control them".

In 1990, he won the C.S. Beals Award from the Canadian Astronomical Society which is awarded for outstanding research to a Canadian astronomer or an astronomer working in Canada.

In 1983, he won the Helen B. Warner Prize for Astronomy given by the American Astronomical Society in recognition of "his many outstanding contributions to a wide range of dynamical problems in both solar-system and galactic dynamics".
