= Algonquin Radio Observatory =

Research facility in Ontario, Canada

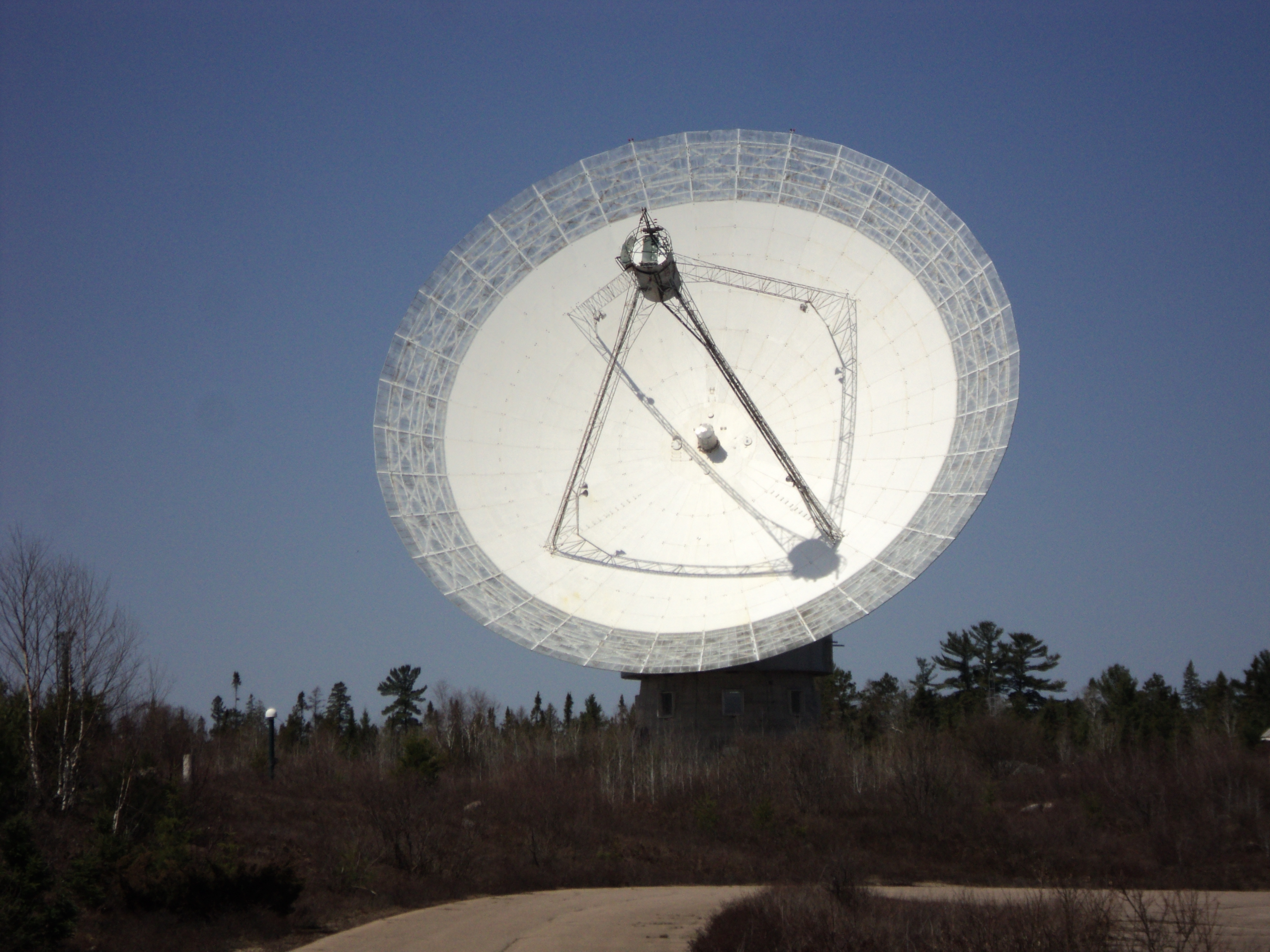
- Named after: Algonquin Provincial Park
- Location: Algonquin Provincial Park, Haliburton County, Ontario, Canada
- Coordinates: 45°57′20″N 78°04′23″W
- Established: 1959
- Website: www.arocanada.com
- Telescopes: Algonquin 46m radio telescope
- Related media on Commons

The Algonquin Radio Observatory (ARO) is a radio observatory located in Algonquin Provincial Park in Ontario, Canada. It opened in 1959 in order to host a number of the National Research Council of Canada's (NRC) ongoing experiments in a more radio-quiet location than Ottawa.

In 1962 it was selected as the site for the Algonquin 46m radio telescope, which has been the site's primary instrument through most of its history. An earlier 10 m instrument was set up in 1961 though was not equipped with a drive mechanism until 1964. The site also hosts a hydrogen maser, a standard feature for radio telescopes that can also serve to receive telemetry from deep space missions. Other instruments formerly at the site included a solar-observing array of thirty-two 10 ft (3 m) dishes, and a single 1.8 m solar flux monitor observing at 10.7 cm wavelength, and an 18 m radio telescope from the University of Toronto (U of T).

In the late 1980s, as a part of an ongoing shift of operations from the NRC, operations of the ARO were passed to the Institute for Space and Terrestrial Science (ISTS, later renamed the Center for Research in Earth and Space Technology (CRESTech)). The multi-dish solar observatory was sold in the early 2000s, and the second solar observatory antenna was moved to the Dominion Radio Astrophysical Observatory in British Columbia. The Observatory's main uses today are in very long baseline interferometry (VLBI) experiments mostly in geodesy, a primary global positioning system site, some use for satellite downlink, and other general experiments.

From 1992 to 1994, The Institute for Space and Terrestrial Science operated the Algonquin Space Campus on the premises for youth aged 14-17. The camp was directed by Chris Coggan and had a curriculum consisting of astronomy, remote sensing and human factors. Alumnus of the camp run an unofficial facebook page AlgonquinSpaceCamp.

Since 2007, the site has been operated by Thoth Technology Inc.

== History ==
=== Solar observations ===
Prior to the construction of the ARO, Arthur Covington had been running a solar observation program at the National Research Council of Canada (NRC) Ottawa Radio Field Station. The station was primarily a radar research site, and ongoing radar work interfered with the solar instrument Covington had built as a personal project. This had started with the wartime observation that the sun gave off radio signals in the 10 cm region when naval ships accidentally swung their radars past the Sun while it was rising or setting.

As post-war researchers examined this effect, they discovered the signals were being generated by sunspots. As the value of the observations became evident, Covington's experimental instrument was moved about five miles (8 km) away to Goth Hill, a more radio-quiet location. But as Ottawa grew this site soon started becoming radio-noisy as well, due mostly to increasing air traffic at a nearby airport. Looking to improve the quality of their measurements, they proposed building a new solar telescope located far away from built up areas. Easy access from Ottawa made Algonquin a fairly obvious choice, although it was about 200 km away the roads were good quality and easy to travel, and there was a mainline railway that passed just south of the selected site.

=== The Observatory ===
Algonquin Radio Observatory was inaugurated in 1959 and became Canada's national radio observatory in 1962. The observatory house complex, radiometer building, utility buildings, University of Toronto Laboratory, 10 m (33 ft) dish and parabolic microwave feed horn instruments were designed in 1959 and construction was completed in phases over the next several years. The first instrument on the site was a new solar telescope, similar to Covington's original 4 ft (1.2 m) instrument, but slightly enlarged to 6 ft (1.8 m) which allowed it to better observe the entire solar disk. This instrument operated in parallel to the original at Goth Hill until 1962, when it took over these duties completely. A second 6 ft (1.8 m) telescope, identical to the one at ARO, was later installed at the Dominion Radio Astrophysical Observatory (DRAO) in Penticton, British Columbia as a backup.

Another solar instrument patterned on a different Goth Hill device followed, this one consisting of a series of thirty-two 10 ft (3 m) parabolic collectors connected to a common 700 ft (215 m) long waveguide. Using phased array techniques this instrument could image portions of the Sun's disk, compared to the single-dish instrument which saw the sun as a single unresolved "dot". The new instrument was up and running in 1966, adding to Covington's study of the sun by directly imaging the radio signal from sunspots and filaments.

In 1961, the site was selected by the National Research Council of Canada as suitable for the construction of a 120 ft (37 m) fully steerable antenna. By 1962, plans showed that the main instrument had grown to a 150 ft (46 m) antenna; construction of this commenced in 1964. The new telescope opened for operation in May 1966.

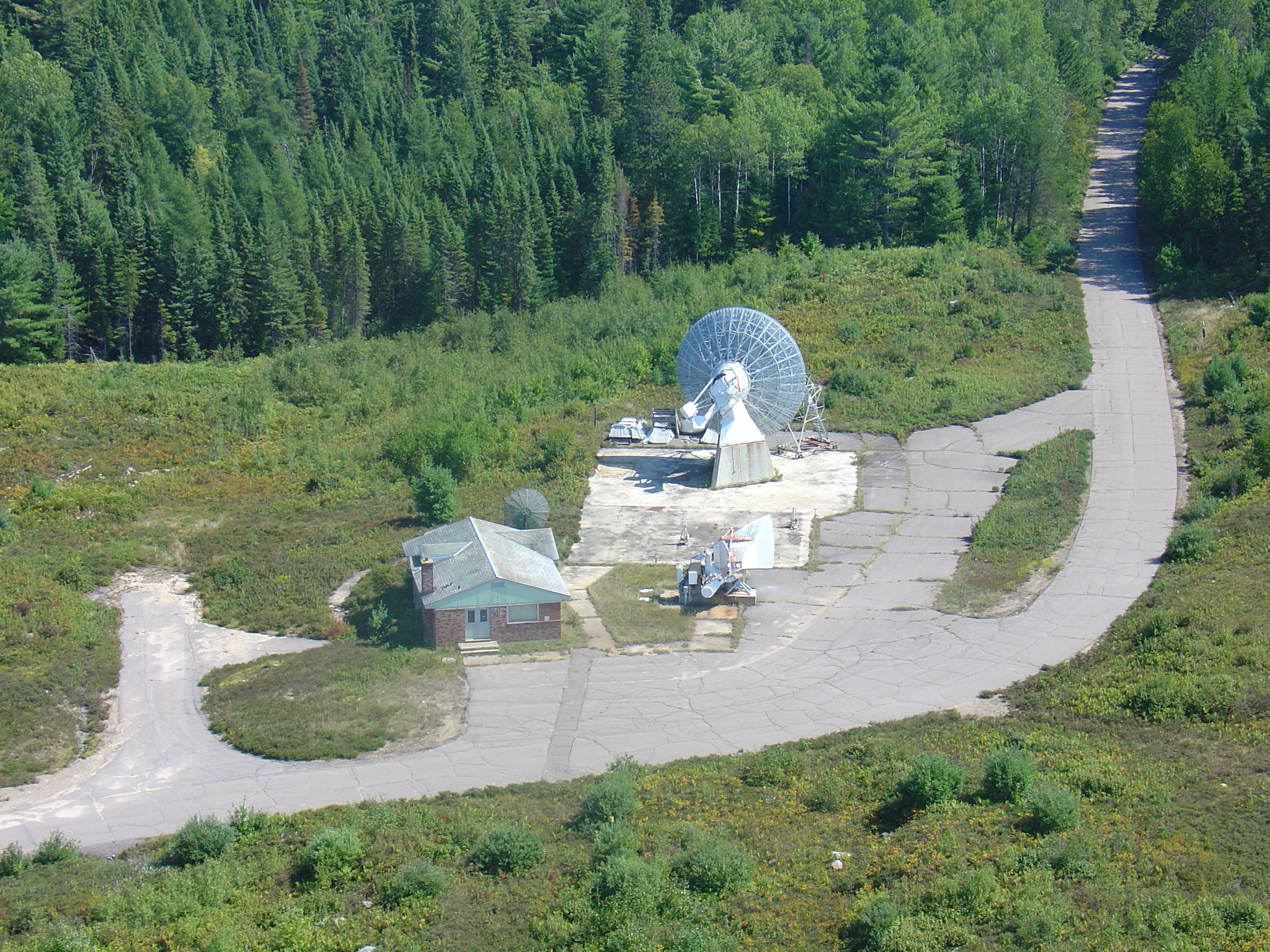
2009 ARO 11 m dish complex

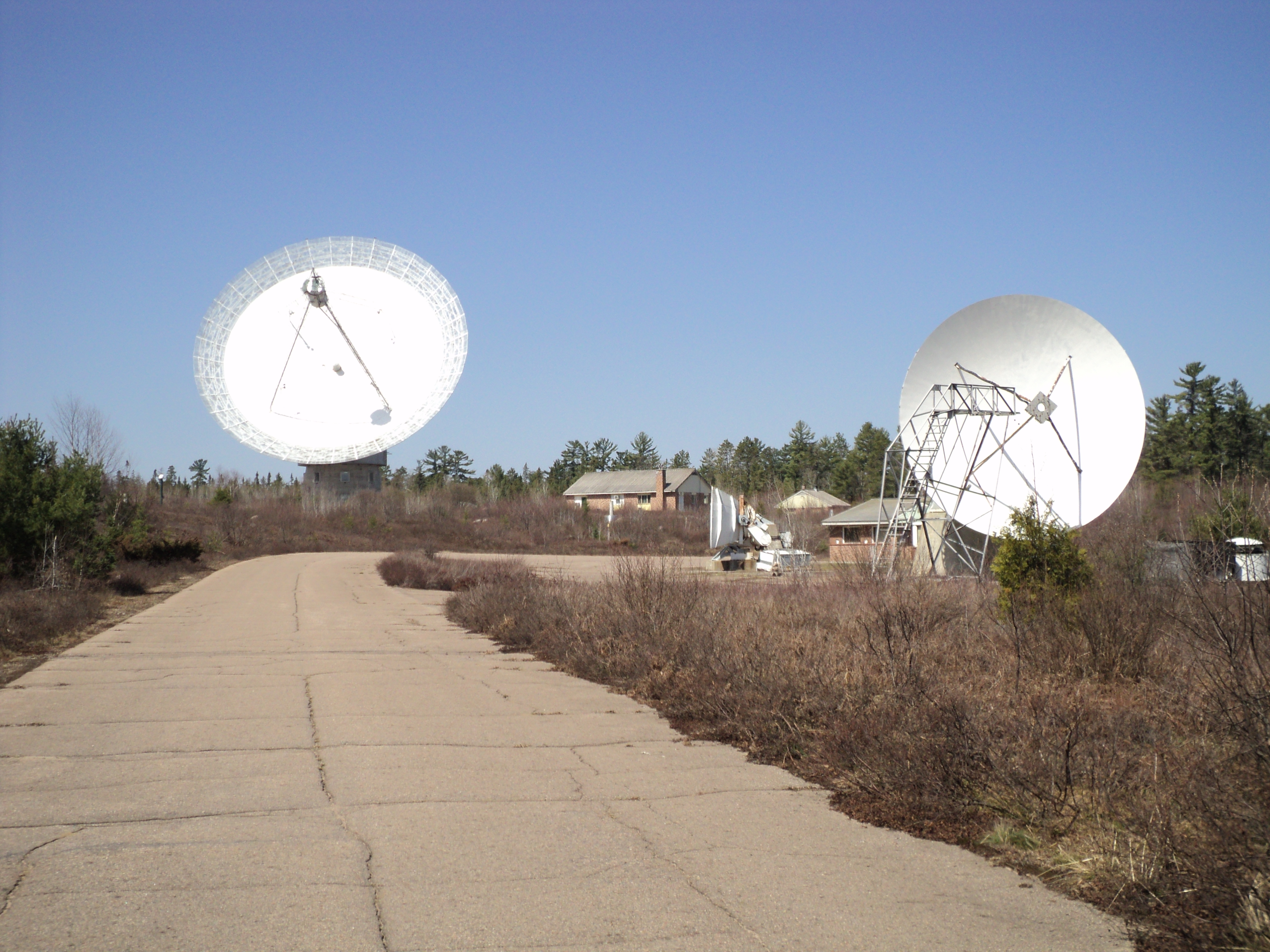
The 46 m Thoth telescope (left) and 11m telescope (right) viewed from the entrance road at the Algonquin Radio Observatory.

The original surface of the 150 ft (46 m) telescope consisted of a mix of aluminum mesh and plates. The mesh was almost transparent to wavelengths less than around a centimeter, and the plated area was not smooth enough to focus shorter wavelengths either. As attention in radio telescopy turned to shorter wavelengths, representing higher energy events, the ARO became less useful. After planning to resurface it so that it could operate at wavelengths as small as 3 mm, the NRC decided to close the ARO in 1987 and purchase a 25% share in the new James Clerk Maxwell Telescope, which would include a radio telescope that could operate at 0.3 to 2 mm.

In 1988 the NRC invited the operators of the Hay River Radio Observatory in the Northwest Territories, the Interstellar Electromagnetics Institute (IEI), to relocate their SETI efforts to ARO. Due to budget cuts the NRC had been unable to use the ARO for research for some time, and were looking for low-cost projects that might be able to make use of the equipment. IEI jumped at the chance, and operated a SETI effort known as Project TARGET on the 18 m U of T telescope until 1991, when continuing budget cuts forced the NRC to cease operation of the site.

The continuing solar measurements, now used worldwide to predict communications problems due to sunspot activity, were turned over to DRAO. At first the DRAO instrument was made "prime", and then once operation was demonstrated, the original Ottawa instrument was moved to join it as a hot backup.

The University of Toronto also operated their own 18 m telescope at the ARO for some time, after having moved it from the David Dunlap Observatory which proved to be too close to the growing Toronto area. The smaller University of Toronto antenna and the 32-dish solar observatory were both donated to project TARGET, and have since been relocated to a new site near Shelburne, Ontario.

The main ARO telescope was later operated by Natural Resources Canada and the Space Geodynamics Laboratory, CRESTech, who used the telescope in VLBI projects to measure the movements of continental plates in geodetic surveys. They have made several upgrades to the main 150 ft (46 m) telescope after taking over operations, allowing it to track at higher speeds necessary to track satellites.

The telescope was used in ongoing VLBI experiments carried out by a worldwide consortium supported by the HALCA satellite, producing a 30,000 km-baseline telescope. The system is driven by the S2 software developed at York University.

=== Current status ===
The observatory is operated by Thoth Technology which provides geodetic and deep space network services utilizing the 46 m antenna. The site is an active control point for the global positioning system. The main antenna is equipped with receivers for the detection of radio sources at VHF, UHF, L-band, S-band and X-band.

The observatory is also equipped with a hydrogen maser that maintains time standard stability to one part in 10^{15} in order to facilitate data correlation. The facility provides educational field schools for students from junior high to postdoctoral training programs including York University's space engineering field school.

Since 2012, the main instrument has participated in an international collaboration to observe pulsars at long wavelengths with the Canadian Institute for Theoretical Astrophysics. In April 2020, the recently refurbished original 33 foot antenna co-detected a Fast Radio Burst (FRB) from galactic magnetar SGR 1935+2154 as part of the CHIME collaboration. The discovery was reported in the journal Nature.

The 46m telescope is operated in a global network with other large radio telescopes around the world in order to create an interferometric array. By careful correlation of this data researchers hope to create a telescope aperture with a resolving power equivalent to the diameter of the Earth. The observatory hosts the Long Wavelength Laboratory of the University of Toronto, Dunlap Institute for Astronomy & Astrophysics and the Communications and Operations section of York University's Space Engineering Laboratory.

== See also ==
- List of radio telescopes
- Prince Albert Radar Laboratory
