= Shantanu Basu =

American astrophysicist (born 1964)

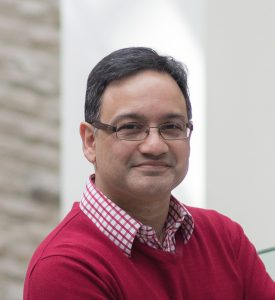
- Basu at UWO, 2015.
- Born: October 5, 1964 (age 61)
- Education: University of Illinois at Urbana-Champaign
- Known for: Migrating Embryo Model for Protoplanetary Disk Evolution
- Scientific career
- Fields: Star Formation
- Workplaces: University of Western Ontario; University of Toronto
- Website: shantanubasu.com

Shantanu Basu (born October 5, 1964) is an American astrophysicist and Professor in the Department of Physics and Astronomy at the Canadian University of Western Ontario, in London, Ontario. In 2025, he began serving as interim director at the Canadian Institute for Theoretical Astrophysics, located at the University of Toronto.

== Career ==
Basu received his PhD in physics from the University of Illinois at Urbana-Champaign in 1993, and held academic positions at Michigan State University and the Canadian Institute for Theoretical Astrophysics, in Toronto, before joining Western in 1999. Basu has made contributions to understanding the fragmentation of interstellar molecular clouds, the role of magnetic fields and angular momentum in gravitational collapse and star formation, the origin of luminosity bursts from young stellar objects, and the origin of power-laws in the mass distribution of stars. He is one of the originators of the Migrating Embryo Model for protoplanetary disk evolution, which is a unified scenario for angular momentum transport, binary star and giant planet formation, and the formation of ejected freely floating low mass objects.

== Awards and honors ==
Asteroid 277883 Basu, discovered by Canadian astronomer Paul Wiegert at the Mauna Kea Observatories in 2006, was named in his honor. The official naming citation was published by the Minor Planet Center on September 19, 2013 (M.P.C. 85018).
