= Ue-Li Pen =

Canadian astrophysicist

Ue-Li Pen (Traditional Chinese: 彭威禮, born 26 July 1967 in Giessen) is a Canadian astrophysicist, cosmologist, and computational physicist.

== Education and career ==
Born in Germany to Taiwanese parents, Ue-Li Pen at age 13 moved with his parents to Canada. He received in 1989 B.Sc. in mathematics from National Taiwan University, in 1991 M.Sc. in physics from National Chiao Tung University, Taiwan, and in 1996 Ph.D. in astrophysics from Princeton University with thesis Numerical Studies of Gasdynamics in Cluster of Galaxies under the supervision of Jeremiah P. Ostriker.

From 1995 to 1998 Pen was a post-doc at Harvard University. In 1998 he joined the faculty of the University of Toronto, where he has remained until the present. He was the Interim Director of the Canadian Institute for Theoretical Astrophysics from 2016 to 2019. He does research on massively parallel simulations in astrophysics, dark matter, and black hole physics. Current projects include "the non-linear dynamics of the cosmic neutrino background, 21cm intensity mapping, pulsar VLBI scintillometry, and Canadian Hydrogen Intensity Mapping Experiment CHIME".

== Honours and awards ==
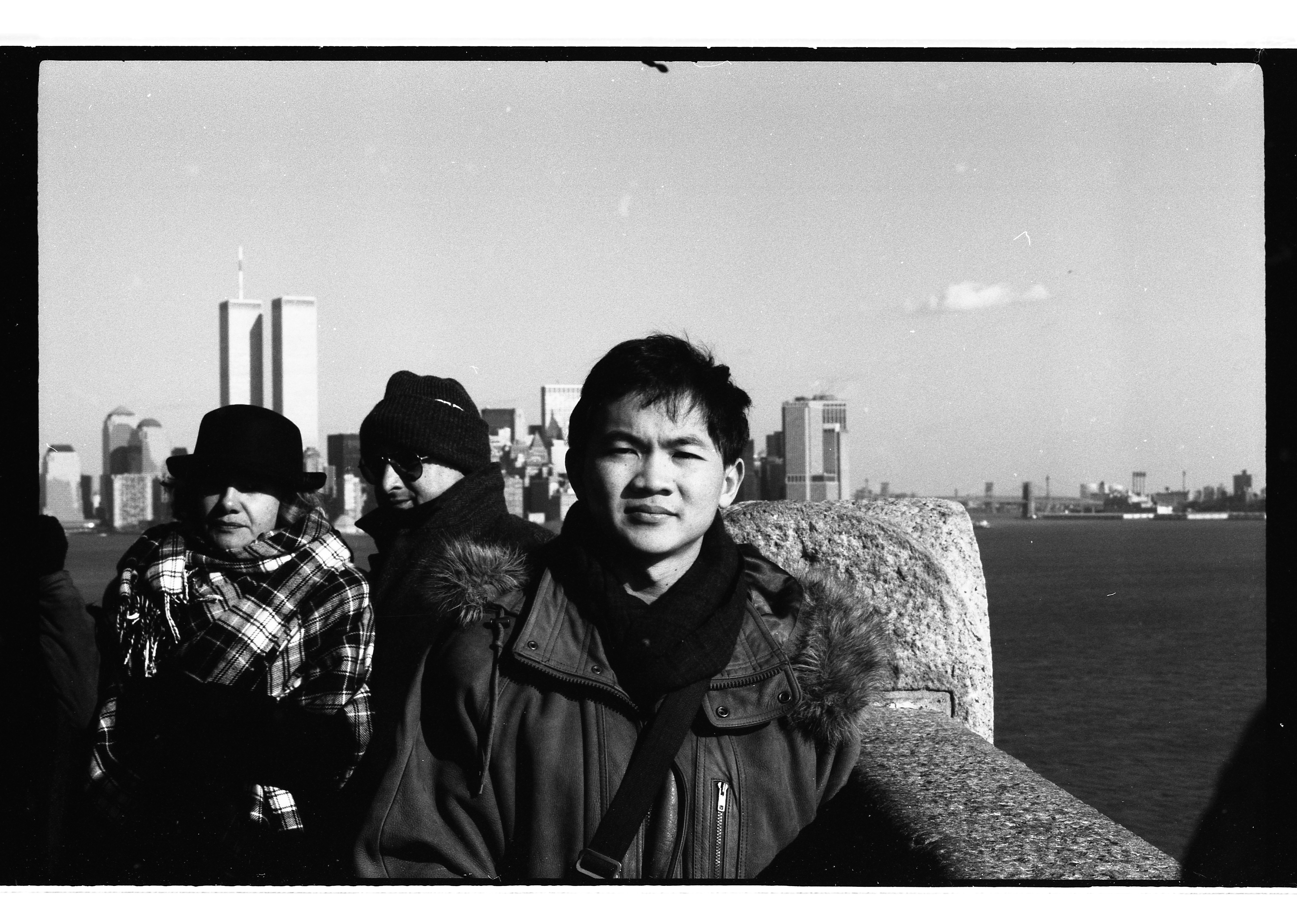
Pen visiting Liberty Island in 1997

- 1994 Ray Grimm Computational Physics Prize
- 1994-1995 Porter Ogden Jacobus Fellowship from Princeton University
- 1995 1st Place, Digital Equipment Co. and Pittsburgh Supercomputer Center Technical Computing Contest
- 1995-1998, Junior Fellow, Harvard Society of Fellows
- 1998–2002 Canadian Institute for Advanced Research Scholar
- 2018 Simons Investigator
- Member of the CHIME collaboration awarded the 2020 Governor General's Innovation Award
- Shared the 2022 Brockhouse Canada Prize for Interdisciplinary Research in Science and Engineering

== Selected publications ==
- with David Spergel: "Cosmology in a string-dominated universe." The Astrophysical Journal Letters 491, no. 2 (1997): L67M doi:10.1086/311074
- with Hy Trac: "A primer on eulerian computational fluid dynamics for astrophysics." Publications of the Astronomical Society of the Pacific 115, no. 805 (2003): 303 doi:10.1086/367747
- with Hugh Merz and Hy Trac: "Towards optimal parallel PM N-body codes: PMFAST." New Astronomy 10, no. 5 (2005): 393-407 doi:10.1016/j.newast.2005.02.001
