= Juna Kollmeier =

American astrophysicist

- Education: Ohio State University; California Institute of Technology
- Scientific career
- Workplaces: Carnegie Institution for Science
- Thesis: The Intergalactic Medium: Absorption, Emission, Disruption (2006)
- Doctoral advisor: David H. Weinberg

Juna Kollmeier is an astrophysicist from the US. She is currently employed at the Carnegie Institution for Science and is the director of the fifth phase of the Sloan Digital Sky Survey, which made its first observations in October, 2020. She served as the director of the Canadian Institute for Theoretical Astrophysics, located at the University of Toronto, from 2021 to 2024.

== Early life and education ==
Kollmeier was going to become a lawyer, until she attended a summer camp and learned how to classify stars. She earned a bachelor's degree in physics from the California Institute of Technology in 2000. She moved to Ohio State University for her doctoral studies on the intergalactic medium, which she completed in 2006.

== Research and career ==
Kollmeier's research focuses on the formation of structure within the universe. She combines a use of cosmological hydrodynamic simulations with analytic theory to understand how galaxies and black holes formed from fluctuations in the density of the early universe. She studies everything from the Intergalactic medium to the Milky Way and supermassive black holes.

After graduating Ohio State University, Kollmeier was a Hubble Fellow and a Carnegie Princeton Fellow. She joined the staff at Carnegie Institution for Science in 2008. In 2014 she reported the photon underproduction crisis, a deficit between the observations of intergalactic hydrogen and ionized hydrogen gas.

In 2015 she was a visiting professor at the Institute for Advanced Study. Today she is a researcher at Carnegie Observatories. She gives regular invited talks. In 2017 it was announced that Kollmeier would lead the Sloan Digital Sky Survey.

She featured on the PBS documentary "Genius".

== See also ==
- List of women in leadership positions on astronomical instrumentation projects
