= Arthur Covington =

Canadian physicist (1913–2001)

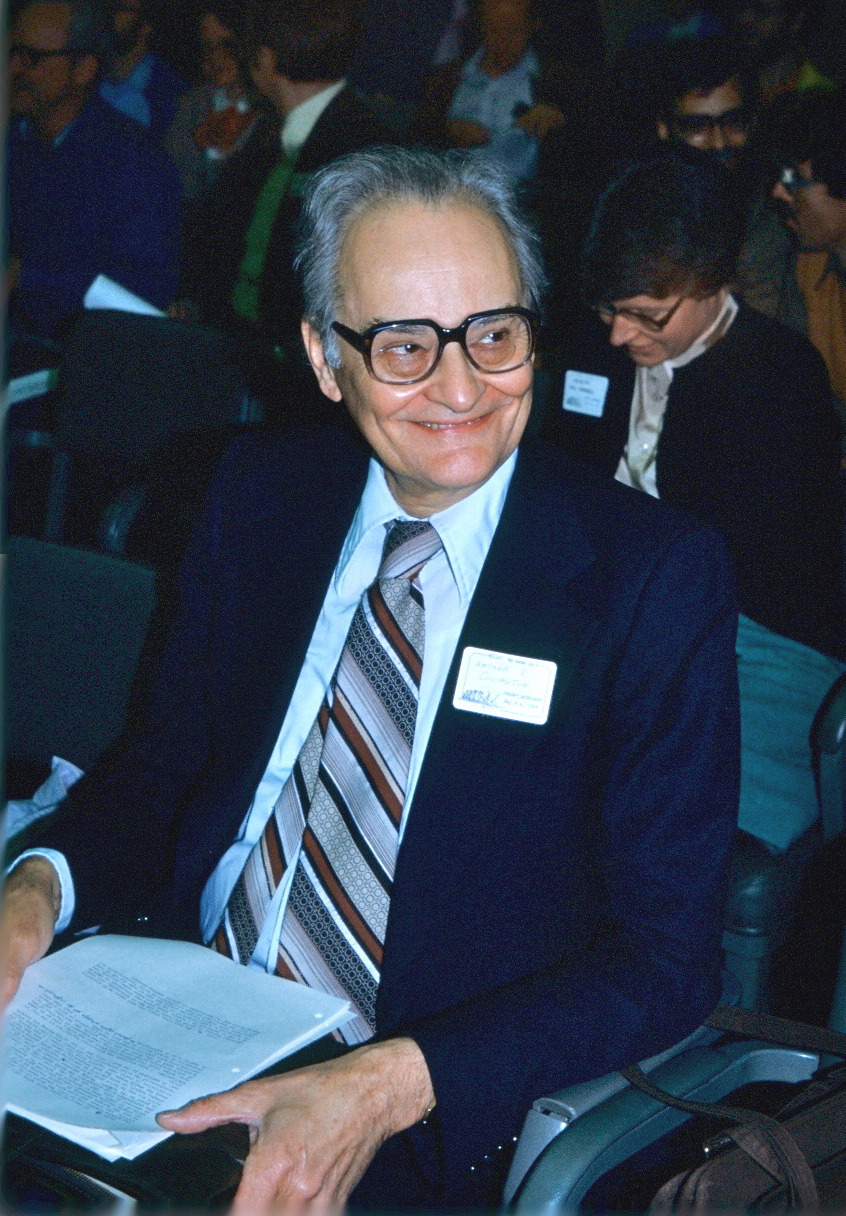
Arthur Covington, at Serendipitous Discoveries in Radio Astronomy, Green Bank, WV, May 1983.

Arthur Edwin Covington (21 September 1913 – 17 March 2001) was a Canadian physicist who made the first radio astronomy measurements in Canada. Through these he made the valuable discovery that sunspots generate large amounts of microwaves at the 10.7 cm wavelength, offering a simple all-weather method to measure and predict sunspot activity, and their associated effects on communications. The sunspot detection program has run continuously to this day.

== Early life and education ==
Covington was born in Regina and grew up in Vancouver. He showed an early interest in astronomy, and had built a 5-inch (130 mm) refractor telescope after meeting members of the local chapter of the Royal Astronomical Society of Canada. He was also interested in amateur radio and operated station VE3CC for a time. He started his career as a radio operator on ships operated by the Canadian National Railways. He put himself through school and eventually earned a bachelor's degree from the University of British Columbia in 1938, and obtained his master's degree from the same institution in 1940 after building an electron microscope. He then moved to University of California, Berkeley where he received his doctoral degree in nuclear physics in 1942. He was still at Berkeley when he was invited to join the National Research Council of Canada (NRC) in Ottawa in 1942 as a radar technician, working at the NRC's Radio Field Station.

== Solar observations ==
Immediately after the war Covington became interested in radio astronomy, and built a small telescope out of the electronic parts from a surplus SCR-268 radar combined with parts from another receiver originally built to test silicon crystal radio parts for radar applications. These electronics were attached to the 4 ft (1.2 m) parabolic dish from a Type III gun-laying radar. The system operated at a frequency of 2800 MHz, or a wavelength of 10.7 cm. Initially the instrument was pointed in the direction of various celestial objects, including Jupiter, the Milky Way, aurora borealis, and the Sun, but it proved too insensitive to pick up any source other than the Sun. So a solar study program was started. As time passed, Covington and his colleagues realized that the Sun's emission at 10.7 cm wavelength was varying, which was unexpected. Thinking at that time was that the solar emission at centimeter wavelengths would be simply black body emission from a ball of hot gas.

Covington became convinced that the effect was due to sunspots, as the flux appeared to vary with the number of visible spots. The resolution of the device, about seven degrees, made it impossible to "pick out" a spot on the Sun's surface for study, making a demonstration of the claim difficult. An opportunity to directly measure this possibility presented itself on November 23, 1946, when a partial solar eclipse passed over the Ottawa area, and Covington was able to conclusively demonstrate that the microwave emissions dropped off precipitously when the Moon covered a particularly large sunspot. This also demonstrated that magnetic fields were instrumental in sunspot activity.

It was entirely by accident that the original instrument operated on frequencies suitable to detection of the 10.7 cm signal, and it had never been intended for "production" use. As the importance of the sunspot measurements became obvious, plans were made to continue these observations over a longer time period. As the Radio Field Station was still actively being used for radar development, and causing heavy interference as a result, a new location was selected about five miles (8 km) away at Goth Hill. Here they measured the whole-disk flux and averaged the measurements to produce three highly accurate measurements a day.

He then set about designing an instrument that could directly resolve portions of the sun's disk. The new telescope consisted of a 150 ft (46 m) long section of 3 by 1½ inch metal waveguide cut with slots in locations to create a simple interferometer with a fan-shaped area of sensitivity. The amount of flux gathered was improved by placing the waveguide in metal trough, and the direction of aim could be changed slightly by rotating the waveguide inside the trough, but in general terms it was used to take measurements as the sun passed through its "beam". The new telescope started operation in 1951, allowing them to directly measure the flux from the Sun's corona and the temperature of the regions above sunspots (about 1,500,000 °C). The Goth Hill observatory also included a number of other instruments for a variety of measurements.

== ARO ==
Increasing radar and radio use in the Ottawa area presented interference problems, and Covington turned his attention to finding a more suitable "radio quiet" location for the program. This led to the creation of the Algonquin Radio Observatory (ARO) in Algonquin Park, about 150 km northwest of Ottawa but relatively easy to access on major highways. A new 6 ft (1.8 m) parabolic dish solar flux telescope was built in 1960, operating in parallel before taking over duties from the Goth Hill instrument in 1962. In 1964 an identical instrument was installed at the Dominion Radio Astrophysical Observatory (DRAO) in British Columbia. This was followed by a more powerful version of the waveguide instrument, this time focused by a series of thirty-two 10 ft (3 m) dishes arranged over a 700 ft (215 m) waveguide, which opened in 1966.

The ARO was greatly expanded in 1966 with the opening of the 150 ft (46 m) deep-space telescope. This was a major research site through the 1960s and 70s, although limitations in its design made it see less use in the 1980s. For some time this instrument was joined by a smaller 18 m telescope originally located at the David Dunlap Observatory outside Toronto, operated by the University of Toronto. The original solar observatories remained in use until 1990 when funding drawdowns at the NRC forced the closure of the entire Algonquin site. In 1991 the 1.8 m dish was moved to the DRAO as a backup instrument.

Covington's work led to other solar-related discoveries. Observations in 1969 led to the realization that certain types of major sunspot breakouts were preceded by a particular type of radio signal, which allowed advanced prediction of upcoming solar storms. As other teams also started studying the solar flux they noticed that the different teams all came to different conclusions about the total flux, due to differences in the instruments and other effects. Covington worked on an effort to correlate these measurements and solve a single flux number, which was published in 1972. He also played a role in the construction of the Indian River Observatory, an amateur built 200 m interferometer.

== Retirement ==
Covington remained director of the ARO until he retired in 1978. He died in 2001 in Kingston, Ontario, at the age of 88.

== Legacy ==
In 2003, the Dominion Radio Astrophysical Observatory named their new main building in Covington's honour. The Herzberg Astronomy & Astrophysics Research Centre of the National Research Council of Canada established the Covington Fellowship in 2008. Covington had many hobbies including a fondness for rare books, many of which have been donated to Queen's University in the Riche-Covington collection.

== Notes ==
1. The exact location of "Goth Hill" is not known, as this term does not appear on modern maps. According to the City of Ottawa Archives, it is likely located on a 186-acre (0.75 km^{2}) plot of land south of the downtown Ottawa area, a plot formerly owned by Robert Goth that appears in the Beldon Atlas, 1878. The terms "hill" and "ridge" were commonly applied to otherwise nondescript land throughout the Gloucester Township area. The Goth plot lies off the eastern end of runway 25 of the Ottawa Macdonald–Cartier International Airport, west of CFS Leitrim. This location fits with all of the known references, which describe it as being "five miles south of Ottawa in South Gloucester".
