= Observatory Hill (Saanich) =

Hill

Coordinates: 48°31′11″N 123°25′05″W

Observatory Hill, also known as Little Saanich Mountain, is a hill with a summit elevation of 224 meters located in Saanich, British Columbia, Canada, in the Coast Douglas Fir zone. Its bedrock is quartz-feldspar gneiss of the Colquitz Formation.

Observatory Hill is the site of the Dominion Astrophysical Observatory, completed in 1918 by the Canadian government.
