= Algonquin 46m radio telescope =

Radio telescope and deep-space radar in Ontario, Canada

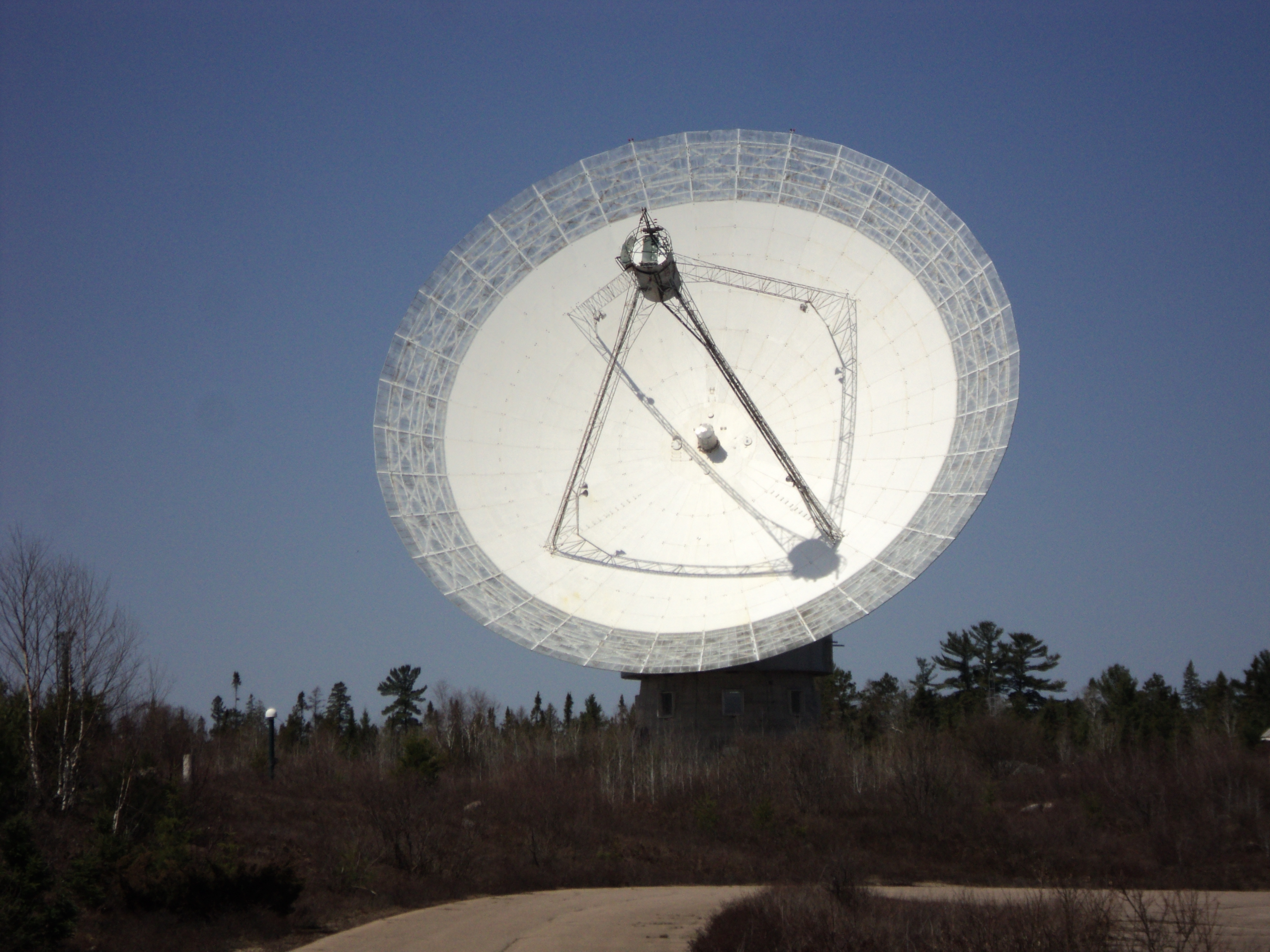
- Location(s): Algonquin Provincial Park, Haliburton County, Ontario, Canada
- Coordinates: 45°57′20″N 78°04′23″W
- Diameter: 45.7 m (149 ft 11 in)
- Collecting area: 1,640 m^{2} (17,700 sq ft)
- Focal length: 18.3 m (60 ft 0 in)
- Website: www.arocanada.com
- Location of Algonquin 46m radio telescope
- Related media on Commons

The Algonquin 46m radio telescope (ARO) is a radio telescope at the Algonquin Radio Observatory, Canada. This radio telescope is historically famous for taking part in the first successful very long baseline interferometry experiment in the 1960s, where it was experimentally arrayed with the 26-metre Telescope at the Dominion Radio Astrophysical Observatory near Penticton, British Columbia.

== History ==
In 1961, the site was selected by the National Research Council of Canada as suitable for the construction of a 120 ft (37 m) fully steerable antenna. By 1962, plans showed that the main instrument had grown to a 150 ft (46 m) antenna.

Construction of the 150 ft (46 m) telescope started in the spring of 1964. The concrete base weighed 300 tons, the steel dish and its rotating mount another 900 tons. An equatorial mount in the base, only five feet high, positioned the instrument. The telescope was designed to operate at higher frequencies than existing instruments, requiring much of it to be constructed of flat plates instead of an open mesh in order to accurately focus these signals. The surface was built to be accurate to 1/5 of a centimeter, allowing it to accurately focus wavelengths to around 1.5 cm. Construction was completed in early 1966, and the telescope started operations in May 1966. Work was also completed a polar mounted paraboloid microwave horn and an 11 m equatorial mount dish north of the main antenna complex.

One of the earliest extended projects carried out on the instrument was the first successful very long baseline interferometry (VLBI) experiment. Long Baseline Interferometry compares the signals from two or more telescopes, using the differences in phase between the signals to resolve the objects. Earlier experiments had used direct electrical links or microwave relays to extend the distance between the two telescopes, while still allowing real-time comparison of the phase of the two signals in a common instrument. However this limited the distance between the two instruments, to the distance the signal could travel while still remaining in-phase. The NRC invented a new technique that eliminated the need to directly compare the signals in real-time. Their technique used 2 inch Quadruplex videotape to record the signals along with a clock signal from an atomic clock. The clock signal allowed the two signals to be later compared with the same accuracy that had formerly required direct realtime connections. NRC funded the installation of identical instruments at the ARO and a smaller telescope at DRAO. Combining the signals would simulated a single 3,074 km diameter radio telescope.

Having learned that the Americans were also attempting a similar VLBI experiment, they tried to be the first to successfully use the technique. Their target for the experiment was quasar 3C 273. Recordings were made into the early morning of April 17, 1967. DRAOs tapes and atomic clock were shipped to the ARO for comparison, and after a month of trying to get the data to "line up", on May 21 they succeeded. After a few more days they had made the first highly accurate measurement of the size of the quasar, showing it was less than 100 light years across, about 1/1000 the span of the Milky Way. Further experiments revealed the fact that 3C 273 had a distinct "jet".

In 1968 the 150 ft (46 m) telescope was used in a geodesy experiment that measured the distance between the ARO and space-tracking telescopes in Prince Albert, Saskatchewan to 2143 km ± 20 m. Other early experiments included a study of flare stars by Queen's University. It was also used by Alan Bridle and Paul Feldman in 1974 for the first SETI search to be carried out at the 1.35 cm wavelength, emitted by water molecules in space.

=== Later uses ===
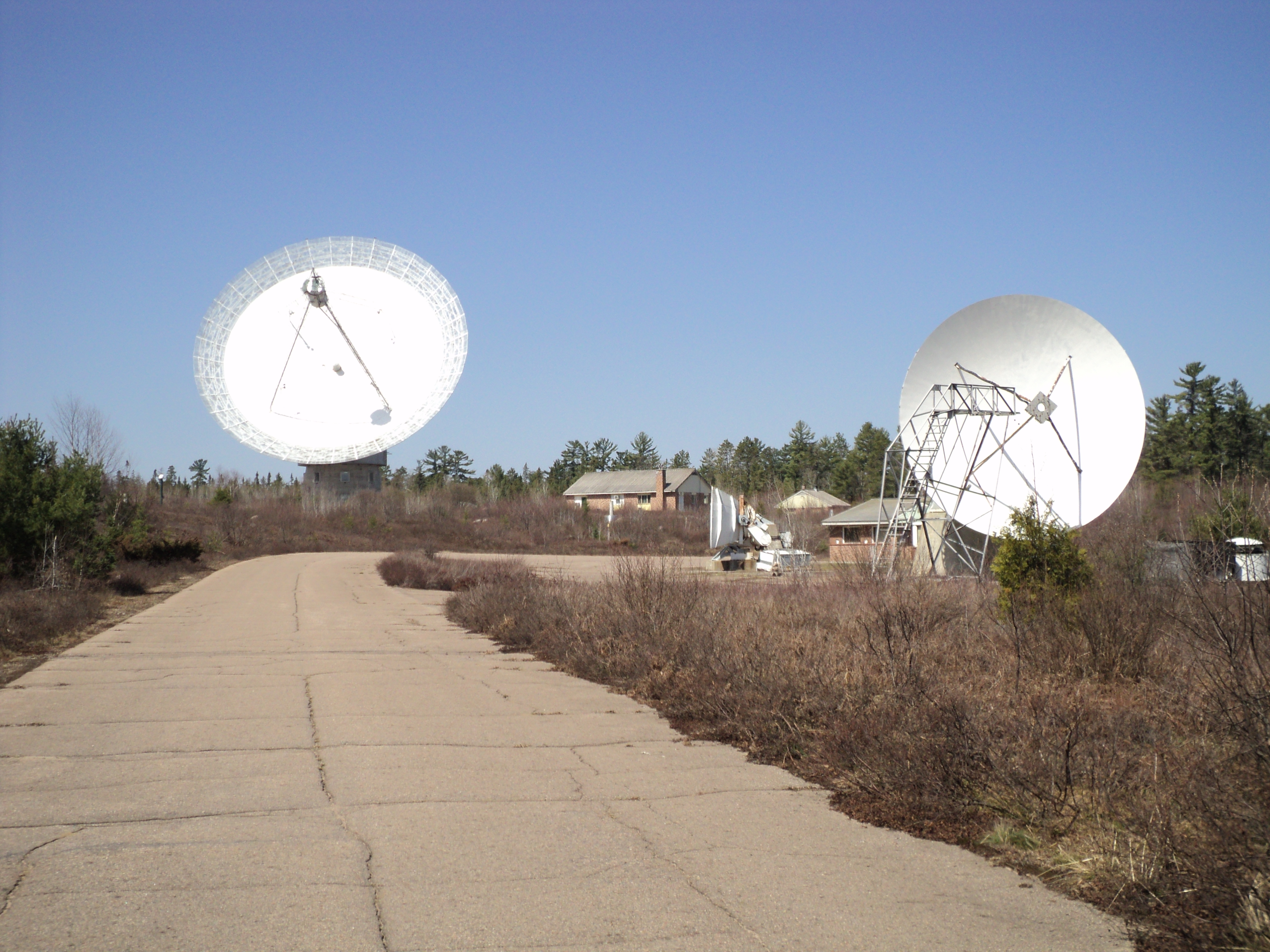
The 46m Thoth telescope (left) and 11m telescope (right) viewed from the entrance road at the Algonquin Radio Observatory.

The surface of the 150 ft (46 m) telescope consisted of a mix of aluminum mesh around the outside and plates covering most of the surface. The mesh was almost transparent to wavelengths less than around a centimeter, and the plated area was not smooth enough to focus wavelengths shorter than about 1.5 cm. As attention in radio telescopy turned to shorter wavelengths, representing higher energy events, the ARO became less useful to NRC. After planning to resurface it so that it could operate at wavelengths as small as 3 mm, the NRC decided to cease operations at ARO in 1987 which were subsequently transferred to the Ontario Institute for Solar and Terrestrial Science (ISTS) in 1991.

ISTS operated the antenna for several years before operation was returned to the Federal Government through Natural Resources Canada (NRCan). NRCan set about modernizing the facility, upgrading the antenna control and receiver systems to enable the antenna to participate in the International very-long-baseline interferometry Service (IVS). The antenna was operated for 48 hours per week until 2006 when one of the antenna's main azimuth load bearings failed.

In 2007, Thoth Technology Inc. acquired operations of the facility from NRCan and undertook a four-year refurbishment of the antenna returning it to fully operational status by 2012. The telescope's current uses include performing VLBI experiments for the University of Toronto's Institute for Theoretical Astrophysics, the monitoring of Global Navigation System (GNS) spacecraft for guidance signal quality control and the downlink of data from interplanetary spacecraft. Since 2016, the antenna has been equipped with a digital radar system that provides Space Situational Awareness data on the location of geostationary spacecraft and debris larger than one square meter at ranges up to 50,000 km.
