= Dominion Radio Astrophysical Observatory =

Research facility in British Columbia, Canada

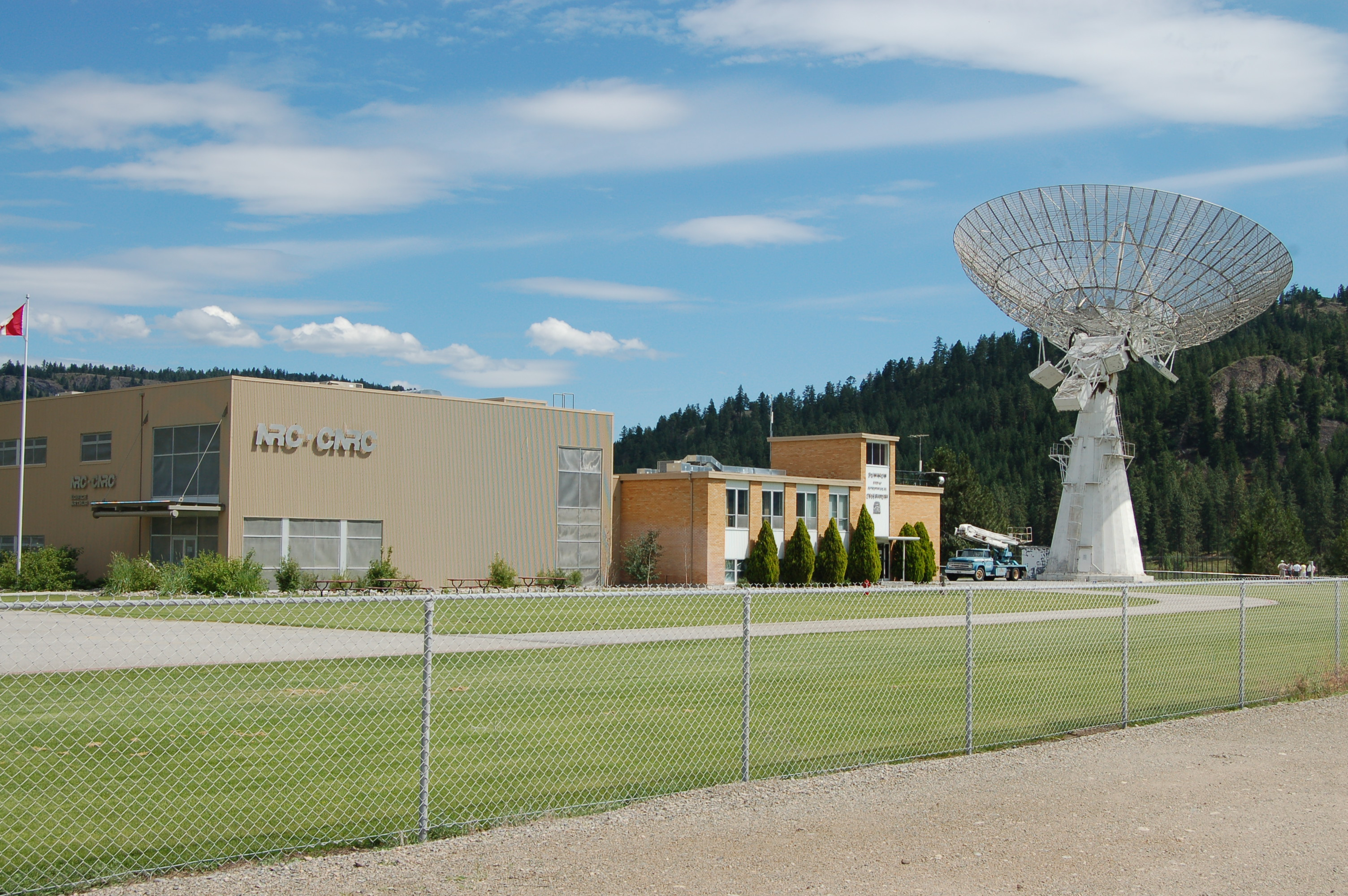
- DRAO main building and John A. Galt Telescope
- Alternative names: DRAO, White Lake Observatory
- Organization: NRC Herzberg Astronomy and Astrophysics Research Centre
- Location: 717 White Lake Road Kaleden, British Columbia, Canada V0H 1K0
- Coordinates: 49°19′15″N 119°37′15″W
- Altitude: 545.671 m (1,790.26 ft)
- Established: 1960
- Website: nrc.canada.ca/en/research-development/nrc-facilities/dominion-radio-astrophysical-observatory-research-facility
- Telescopes: DRAO Solar-flux monitor; DRAO Synthesis telescope; John A. Galt Telescope; Canadian Hydrogen Intensity Mapping Experiment
- Location of Dominion Radio Astrophysical Observatory
- Related media on Commons

The Dominion Radio Astrophysical Observatory is a research facility founded in 1960 and located at Kaleden, British Columbia, Canada. The site houses four radio telescopes: an interferometric radio telescope, a 26-m single-dish antenna, a solar flux monitor, and the Canadian Hydrogen Intensity Mapping Experiment (CHIME) — as well as support engineering laboratories. The DRAO is operated by the Herzberg Institute of Astrophysics of the National Research Council of the Government of Canada. The observatory was named an IEEE Milestone for first radio astronomical observations using VLBI.

== Facilities ==
=== Synthesis telescope ===
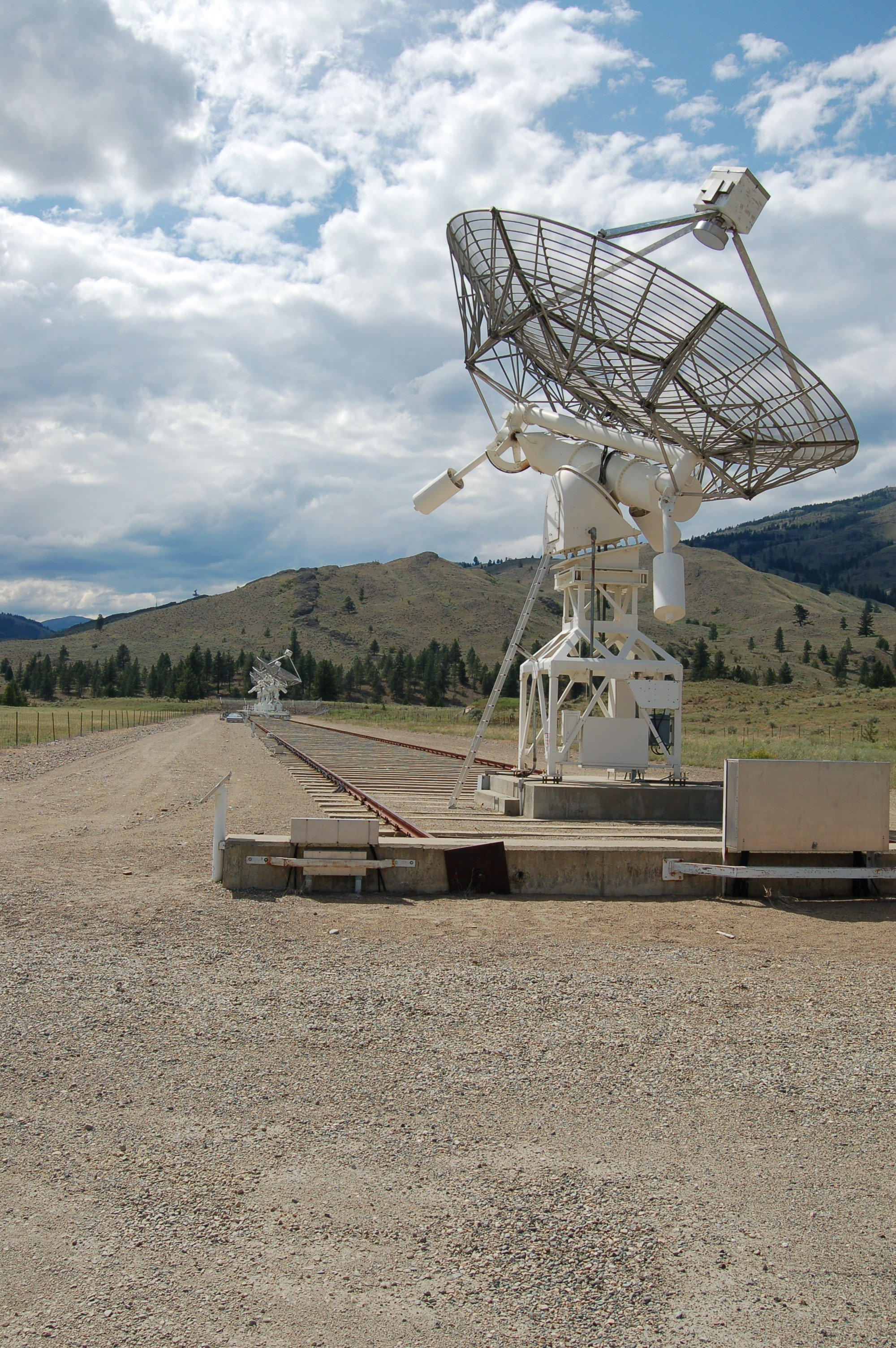
DRAO Synthesis Telescope

The Synthesis Telescope consists of seven nine-metre metal-mesh reflector antennas along a 600-m east-west baseline. The antennas are equipped with single-circular polarisation receivers at 408 MHz and dual circular receivers at 1420 MHz, from which all four Stokes parameters may be formed. A spectrometer may also be employed at 1420 MHz for study of the 21-cm hydrogen line. Maps of the sky are formed using the technique of aperture synthesis.

=== John A. Galt Telescope ===
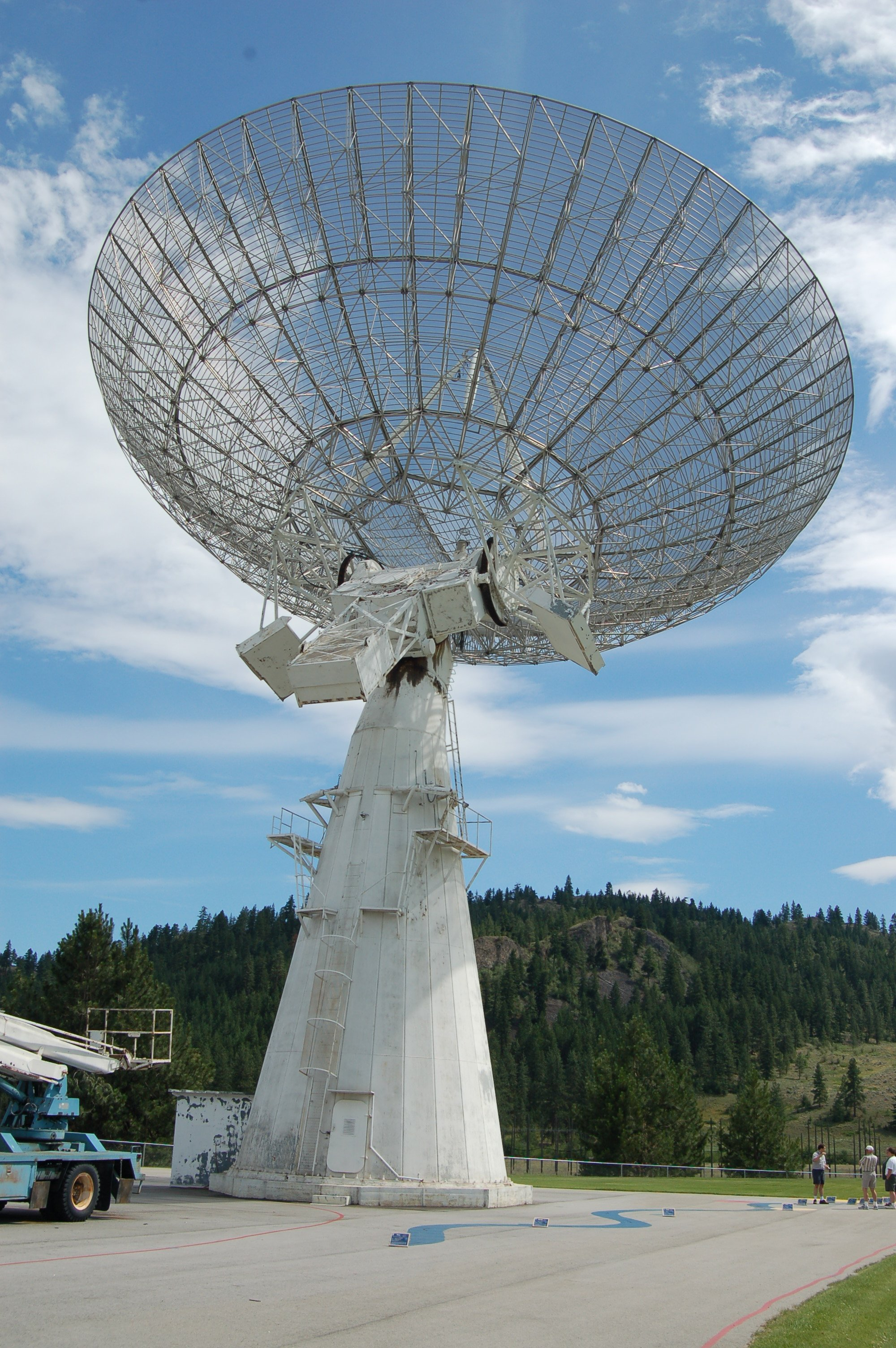
John A. Galt Telescope

The John A. Galt Telescope consists of a single 25.6-metre-diameter (84 ft) metal-mesh antenna which can be equipped to observe at 408 MHz and at 1.5, 2.7, 4.9, 6.6, and 8.4 GHz, including the hydrogen line near 1.4 GHz, the OH lines around 1.6 GHz, and the methanol line near 6.6 GHz. The telescope, formerly simply referred to as the 26-metre Telescope, was renamed in honour of John A. Galt, first employee and former director of the DRAO, during a special ceremony in 2014. The Galt telescope was used in the first successful measurements using very long baseline interferometry.

=== Solar-flux monitor ===
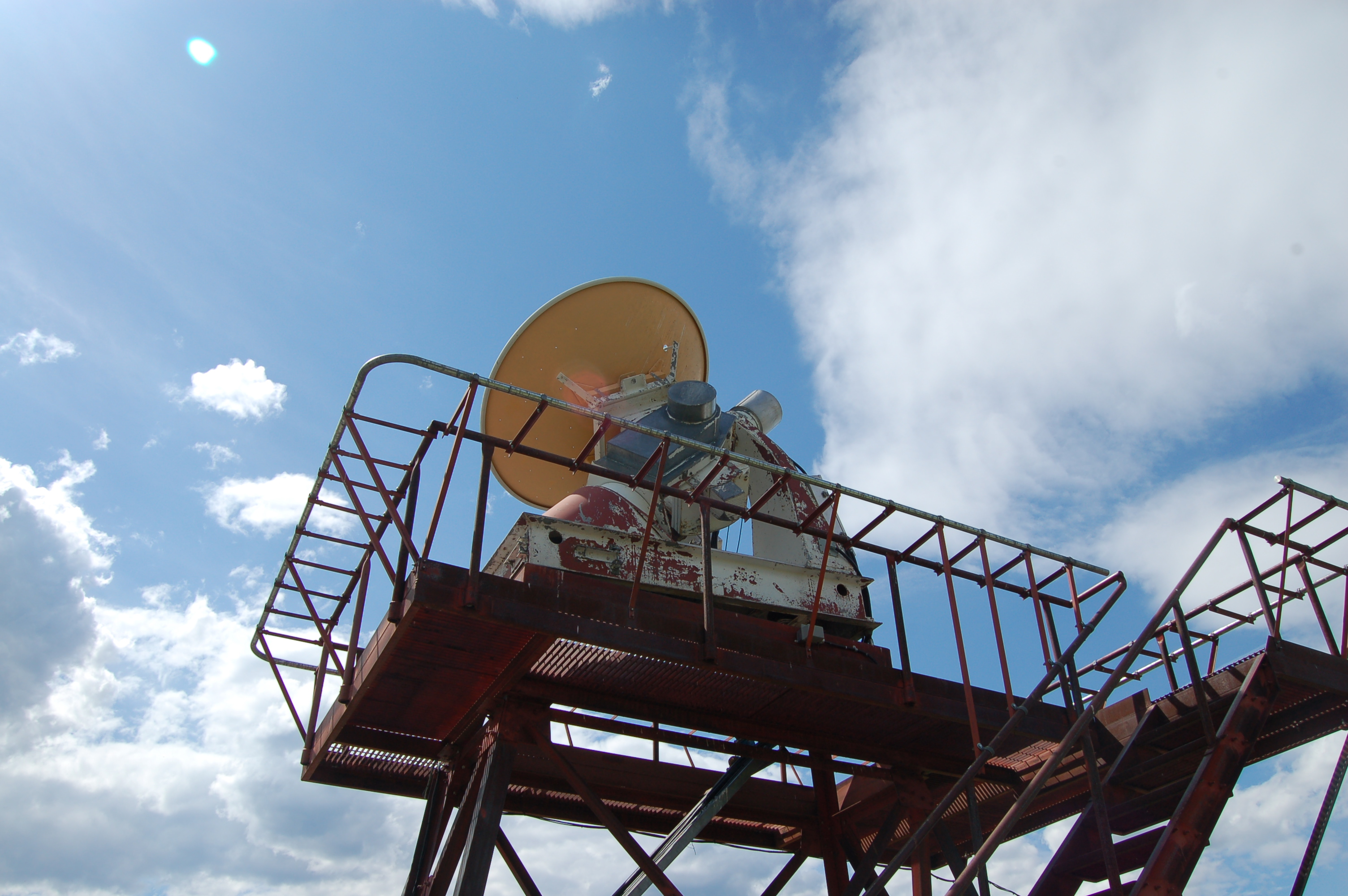
Solar flux monitor

The monitor consists of two solid-surface dish antennas simultaneously observing at 10.7-cm wavelength, located near Penticton, British Columbia.

=== Canadian Hydrogen Intensity Mapping Experiment ===
The Canadian Hydrogen Intensity Mapping Experiment (CHIME) is a radio interferometer which is mapping the 21 cm line of neutral Hydrogen over the cosmological redshift range of 0.8 to 2.5. It consists of four cylindrical reflector antennas, each 100 metres long and 20 metres wide. Each cylinder has 256 dual-polarisation feed antennas spaced along the focal line. Data from this telescope will be used to measure baryon acoustic oscillations, giving a length scale that can be used to measure the expansion history of the universe.

=== Engineering ===
In addition to observing facilities, the DRAO operates design and development laboratories for receivers and electronics. Projects include instrumentation for external observatories, such as the Very Large Array and the James Clerk Maxwell Telescope.

== See also ==
- Algonquin 46m radio telescope
- Algonquin Radio Observatory
- Canadian Institute for Theoretical Astrophysics
- Herzberg Institute of Astrophysics
- Dominion Astrophysical Observatory
- List of radio telescopes
