= Dominion Astrophysical Observatory =

Observatory in Saanich, Canada

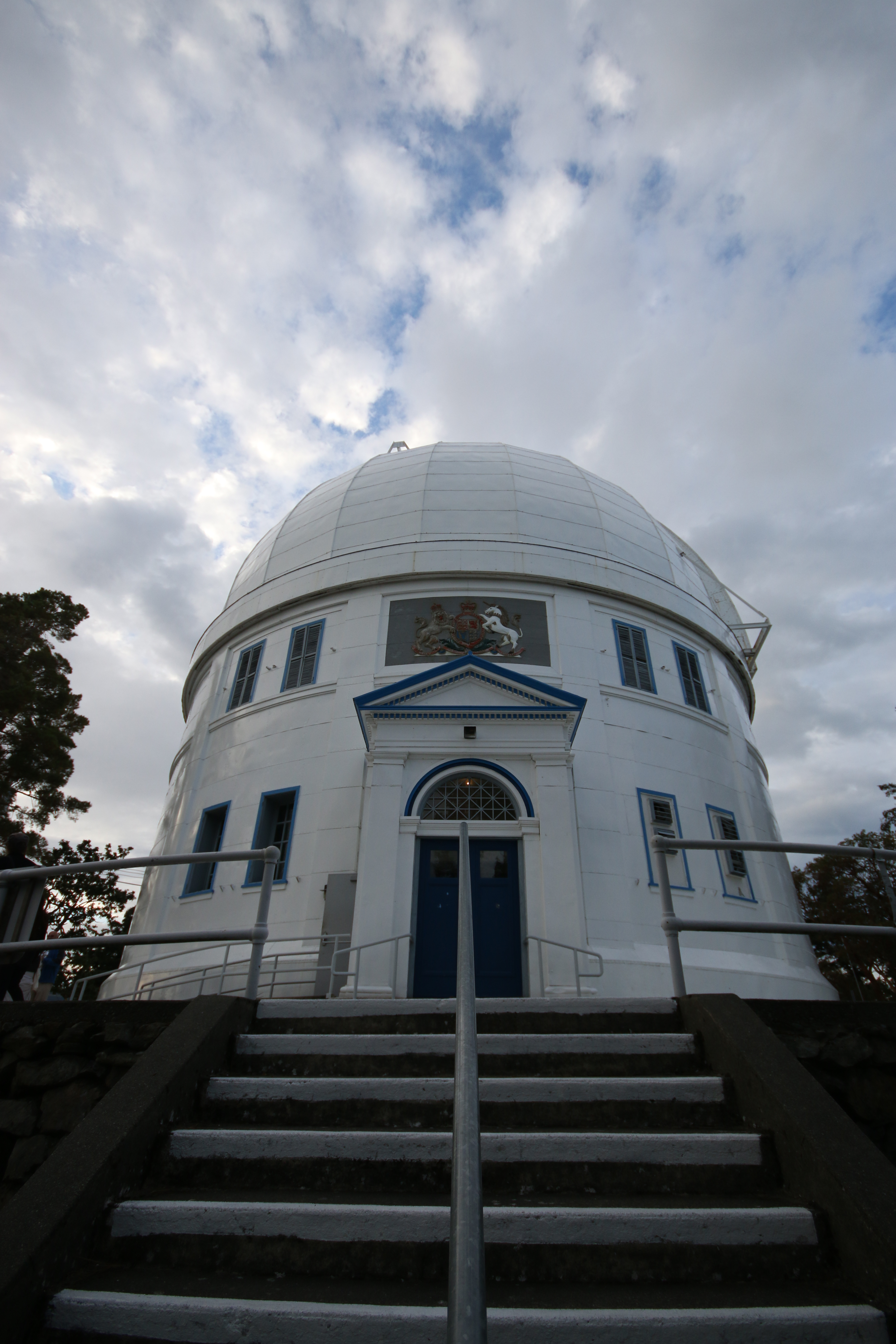
- Interactive map of the Dominion Astrophysical Observatory area
- Alternative names: Observatoire fédéral d'astrophysique

General information
- Coordinates: 48°31′11″N 123°25′06″W
- Current tenants: National Research Council
- Opened: 1918

Design and construction
- Architect: Edgar Lewis Horwood
- Architecture firm: Dominion Architect of Canada

Website
- NRC-DAO Website

National Historic Site of Canada
- Official name: Dominion Astrophysical Observatory National Historic Site of Canada
- Designated: 2010

The Dominion Astrophysical Observatory, located on Observatory Hill, in Saanich, British Columbia, was completed in 1918 by the Canadian government. The Dominion architect responsible for the building was Edgar Lewis Horwood. The main instrument is the 72-inch-aperture (1.83 m) Plaskett telescope, proposed and designed by John S. Plaskett in 1910 with the support of the International Union for Cooperation in Solar Research. Following completion, Plaskett remained the head of the observatory until 1935.

The observatory has been designated a national historic site of Canada, as it is a world-renowned facility where many discoveries about the nature of the Milky Way were made, and it was one of the world's main astrophysical research centres until the 1960s.

== Centre of the Universe ==
The Centre of the Universe is the public interpretive centre for the observatory, located across the parking lot from the Dominion Astrophysical Observatory telescope. The centre opens for free public star parties about 20 times a year on Saturday nights, for schools, and for community and private tours. The star parties, supported also by the Royal Astronomical Society of Canada, Victoria Centre (RASC). include solar and nighttime viewing with RASC and DAO telescopes, presentations, lectures, and displays. These events as well as the RASC itself date back to the observatory's foundation, interrupted only twice in that period, by World War II and by the COVID Pandemic.

The centre itself features interactive exhibits about astronomy, the work of the observatory and its parent organization, the NRC Herzberg Institute of Astrophysics. It houses the original mirror of the telescope, cast in 1914, and the 1:10 scale original model of the telescope dome, built in 1915, as well as a number of other artefacts dating from the era of the observatory's foundation. Tours of the telescope start from the Centre. The centre also contains a 25-seat planetarium painted to look like the sun. It is 4.47 metres across, and has a recent version of the Digitalis Education System's Nightshade Generation 3 software, able to project the sky, the motion of the stars, planetary orbits, and full dome movies.

The centre was opened in 2002 but closed by the federal government in August 2013, which stated financial issues as the reason. The Centre of the Universe was reopened in 2014 through an arrangement with the a working group consisting of members of the public who came together in response to the closure, along with the Royal Astronomical Society of Canada's Victoria Centre, and Science Venture at the University of Victoria. It was reopened by the Friends of the Dominion Astrophysical Observatory Society (FDAO), which was incorporated in June 2015 with a goal of re-establishing public science outreach at the university and resuming the Centre of the Universe as a resource for the City of Victoria and an attraction also for domestic and international visitors. In May 2016, the FDAO signed a licence to occupy for the Centre of the Universe with the National Research Council.

The Friends of the Dominion Astrophysical Observatory now runs the education programmes on-site and online. The organization continues to increase the number of star parties, tours, and events at the centre. Financial support for the activities at the centre, as well as from the local population, includes the Victoria Foundation, the British Columbia Community Gaming Grant program, and Pacific Economic Development Canada.

== Telescope construction ==
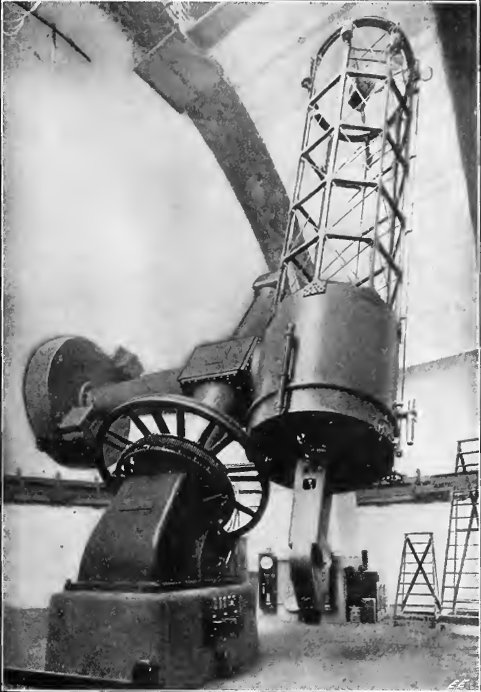
The Plaskett telescope in 1920

The building that houses the telescope was built by McAlpine-Robertson Company of Vancouver for a price of $75,000. Both the building and dome, made by Warner & Swasey Company, are double walled. The one-tenth scale model of the dome and telescope were featured at the Panama–Pacific International Exposition in 1915. The model survives to this day, and is featured in the interpretive centre.

The glass mirror, 73 inches (1.85 m) in diameter and 12 inches (0.30 m) thick, weighs approximately 4,340 pounds (1.97 t) and was made by the Saint-Gobain company in their Charleroi glass works in Antwerp, Belgium, and shipped only a week before the start of World War I. It was then ground in the United States at the John A. Brashear Co. (founded by astronomer and telescope pioneer John A. Brashear) in Pittsburgh. The mirror had to be reground twice, once due to a mysterious scratch and the second time due to a flaw in the grinding. This added two years to the completion time of the telescope, pushing the date back to 1918. The mirror was sent to Victoria by train, which arrived in Victoria six days later. The completed mirror was hauled up Little Saanich Mountain by horse and wagon.

Images of the construction are available.

== Use ==
A spectrograph is fitted to the Cassegrain focus and an imaging charge-coupled device (CCD) is attached to the Newtonian focus.

In 1962, a 48-inch (1.22 m) optical telescope was added to the observatory. The telescope, ordered in 1957, was made by Grubb Parsons of Newcastle-upon-Tyne, England. Its Coude focus is used with a room-sized spectrograph.

In 1995, the observatory was made the headquarters of the NRC Herzberg Institute of Astrophysics, which operates several Canadian telescopes, both optical and radio. The NRC collaborates with international partners such as the Canada-France-Hawaii Telescope, the Gemini Telescopes in Hawaii and Chile, and the ALMA Observatory, also in Chile. The telescopes are in constant use and are open for visitors year round.

As of October 2022, the Dominion Astrophysical Observatory Director was Dr James Di Francesco.

== World-record status ==
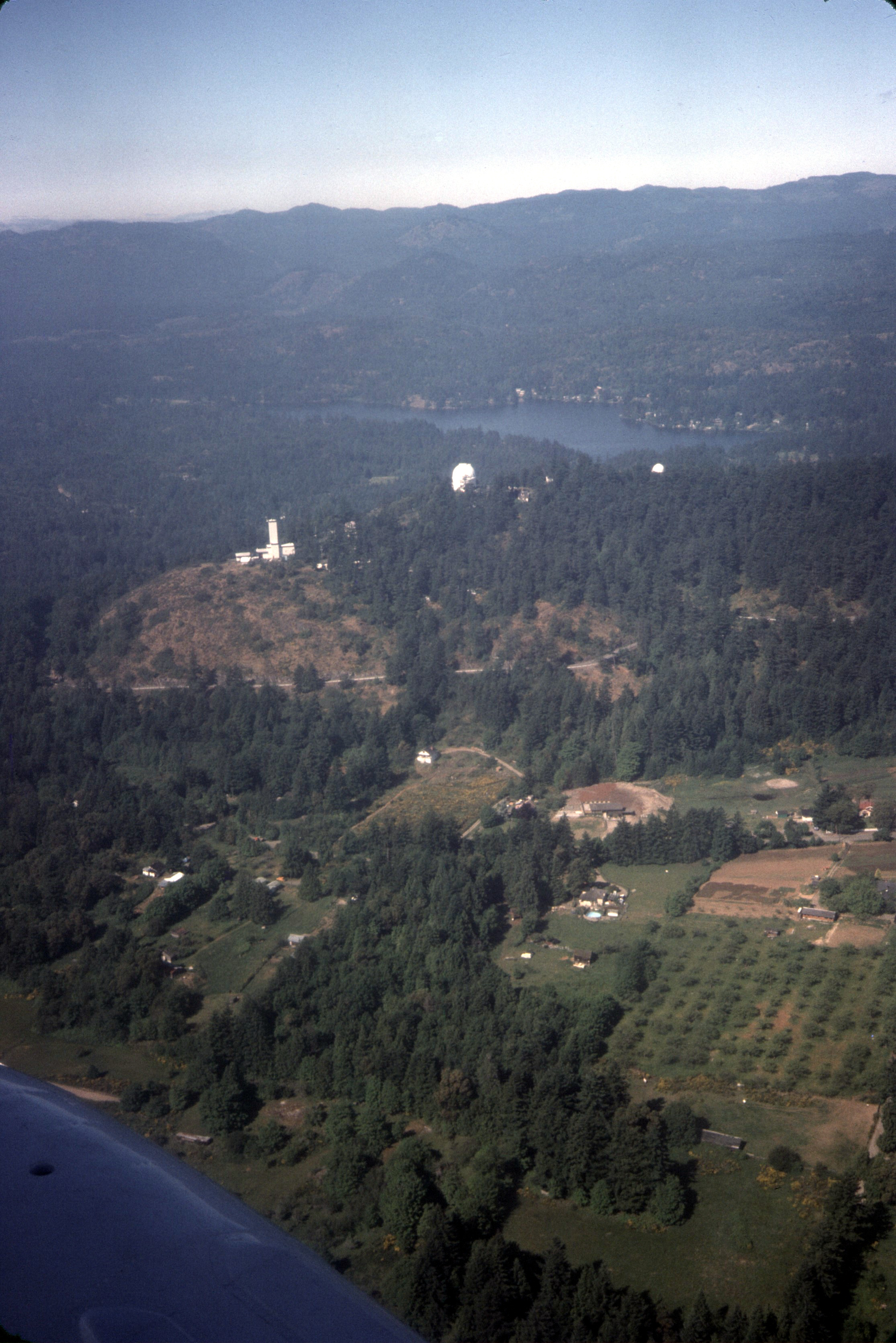
The Dominion Astrophysical Observatory as seen from the air in 1974

The Plaskett telescope was possibly planned to be the largest telescope in the world but delays meant it was completed and saw "first light" on May 6, 1918, six months after the 100-inch Hooker telescope (2.54 m) at Mount Wilson Observatory. However, although the Hooker telescope achieved a first light on November 1, 1917, it was not really opened until 1918, which was also affected by delays especially from World War I. At this point most observatories still had 19th-century-era refractors of at most 1 to 2 feet (0.30 to 0.61 m) in aperture, as a shift to reflectors was still growing.

It also surpassed the 72-inch (1.83 m) metal mirror Leviathan of Parsonstown, built in 1845 but dismantled by the 1910s.

The Plaskett telescope remained the second largest until the 74-inch (1.88 m) reflector at the David Dunlap Observatory debuted at the University of Toronto, Canada in 1935.

Top 2 in 1918:

Number	Name / Observatory	Image	Aperture	Altitude	First Light	Special advocate
1	Hooker telescope Mount Wilson Obs.		100 in 2.54 m	1,742 m 5,715 ft	1917	George Ellery Hale; Andrew Carnegie
2	Plaskett telescope Dominion Astrophysical Obs.		72 in 1.83 m	230 m 750 ft	1918	John S. Plaskett

The next largest were the Harvard College Observatory 60-inch (1.52 m) and the Mount Wilson 60-inch Hale.

== See also ==
- NRC Herzberg Institute of Astrophysics
- Dominion Radio Astrophysical Observatory
- List of largest optical reflecting telescopes
- List of largest optical telescopes in the 20th century
