= Functionalism (international relations) =

Theory of international relations

Functionalism is a theory of international relations that arose during the interwar period principally from the strong concern about the obsolescence of the state as a form of social organization. Rather than the self-interest of nation states that realists see as a motivating factor, functionalists focus on common interests and needs shared by states (but also by non-state actors) in a process of global integration triggered by the erosion of state sovereignty and the increasing weight of knowledge and hence of scientists and experts in the process of policy-making. Its roots can be traced back to the liberal and idealist traditions that started with Immanuel Kant and goes as far as Woodrow Wilson's "Fourteen Points" speech.

Functionalism is a pioneer in globalization theory and strategy. States had built authority structures upon a principle of territorialism. State theories were built upon assumptions that identified the scope of authority with territory, aided by methodological territorialism. Functionalism proposed to build a form of authority based in functions and needs, which linked authority with needs, scientific knowledge, expertise and technology: it provided a supraterritorial concept of authority. The functionalist approach excludes and refutes the idea of state power and political influence (realist approach) in interpreting the cause for such proliferation of international organizations during the interwar period (which was characterized by nation state conflict) and the subsequent years.

According to functionalism, international integration—the collective governance and material interdependence between states—develops its own internal dynamic as states integrate in limited functional, technical and economic areas. International agencies would meet human needs, aided by knowledge and expertise. The benefits rendered by the functional agencies would attract the loyalty of the populations and stimulate their participation and expand the area of integration. There are strong assumptions underpinning functionalism: that the process of integration takes place within a framework of human freedom; that knowledge and expertise are currently available to meet the needs for which the functional agencies are built; that states will not sabotage the process.

== Neofunctionalism ==
Neofunctionalism reintroduced territorialism in the functional theory and downplayed its global dimension. Neofunctionalism is simultaneously a theory and a strategy of regional integration, building on the work of David Mitrany. Neofunctionalists focused their attention solely on the immediate process of integration among states (regional integration). Initially, states integrate in limited functional or economic areas. Thereafter, partially integrated states experience increasing momentum for further rounds of integration in related areas. This "invisible hand" of integration phenomenon was termed "spill-over." by the neofunctionalist school. This was most apparent in the study of euthanasia. Although integration can be resisted, it becomes harder to stop integration's reach as it progresses.

According to neofunctionalists, there are two kinds of spillover: functional and political. Functional spillover is the interconnection of various economic sectors or issue-areas, and the integration in one policy-area spilling over into others. Political spillover is the creation of supranational governance models, as far-reaching as the European Union, or as voluntary as the United Nations.

One of its protagonists was Ernst B. Haas, an American political scientist. Jean Monnet's approach to European integration, which aimed at integrating individual sectors in hopes of achieving spill-over effects to further the process of integration, is said to have followed the neofunctional school's tack. Unlike previous theories of integration, neofunctionalism declared to be non-normative and tried to describe and explain the process of regional integration based on empirical data. Integration was regarded as an inevitable process, rather than a desirable state of affairs that could be introduced by the political or technocratic elites of the involved states' societies. Its strength however was also its weakness: While it understood that regional integration is only feasible as an incremental process, its conception of integration as a linear process made the explanation of setbacks impossible.

== Comparing functionalism to realism ==
John McCormick compares functionalism's fundamental principles with those of realism (comments added to emphasise key distinctions):

	Realism	Functionalism	Comments
Dominant goals of actors	Military security	Peace and prosperity	Security through: power versus collaboration
Instruments of state policy	Military force and economic instruments	Economic instruments and political acts of will	State policy of assertion versus negotiation
Forces behind agenda formation	Potential shifts in the balance of power and security threats	Initial emphasis on low politics, such as economic and social issues	Agenda sought: maintenance of position versus reaching consensus
Role of international organizations	Minor; limited by state power and the importance of military force	Substantial; new, functional international organizations will formulate policy and become increasingly responsible for implementation	International involvement: minimal versus substantial

== Functional cooperation and functional international organization ==
The objective of functionalism towards global peace is achieved through functional cooperation by the work of international organizations (including intergovernmental and non-governmental organizations). The activities of functional international organizations involve taking actions on practical and technical problems rather than those of military and political nature. They are also non-controversial politically and involve a common interest to solve international problems that could best be tackled in a transnational manner. According to Mitrany, dealing with functional matters provides the actors in the international community the opportunity to successfully cooperate in a non-political context, which might otherwise be harder to achieve in a political context. Further development would lead to a process called “autonomous development” towards multiplication, expansion, and deepening of functional international organizations. Ideally, this would ultimately result in an international government. Functionalists in this manner assume that cooperation in a non-political context would bring international peace. Eradication of existent non-political, non-military global problems, which Functionalists consider to be the very origin of conflict within the global community, is what they aim to pursue. However, critics point out some limitations of functionalist assumption: in practice, dealing with functional matters does not necessarily and always facilitate cooperation; its simplified assumption overlooks different causes of state conflict.

The proliferation of functional international organizations has occurred without adequate reorganization and coordination efforts due to a lack of central global governance to ensure accountability of such organizations. As a result, a pattern of decentralization could be observed among functional international organizations to the present day. Notably, the League of Nations' effort to coordinate functional international organizations in the field of social and economic cooperation through establishment of UN Economic and Social Council has been futile. As a result, the idea of decentralization prevails to the present day except in cases of special cooperative relationships between Economic and Social Council and some functional organizations. Subsequently, summits such as the World Summit for Social Development in 1995, the Millennium Summit in 2000 and Earth Summit 2002 were held to address and coordinate functional cooperation, especially regarding the social and economic aspects.

Substantive functions of functional international organizations include human rights, international communication, health, the law of the sea, the environment, education and information, international relief programs, refugee support, as well as economic development.

== See also ==
- Chapter IX of the United Nations Charter
- Commission for Social Development
- David Mitrany
- Earth Summit 2002
- Ernst B. Haas
- European Union
- Functional organization
- Human rights
- Intergovernmentalism
- International organization
- International relations theory
- Kofi Annan
- List of specialized agencies of the United Nations
- Millennium Summit
- Neofunctionalism
- Spillover effect
- United Nations Economic and Social Council
