= List of faculty members at the Institute for Advanced Study =

The Institute for Advanced Study (IAS) is a private institution in Princeton, New Jersey, designed to foster research by scientists in a variety of fields without the complications of teaching or funding, or the agendas of sponsorship. The IAS uses the word faculty in a special way and denotes a lifetime appointment. Although they do not teach classes (because there are no classes at IAS), faculty hold the title of Professor, and often give lectures and direct research.

This list includes current and former Faculty members, and their dates of tenure at the Institute.

Name	Field	Year joined	Year Left	Notes
Stephen L. Adler	theoretical physicist	1969	2010	Emeritus 2010-
Suzanne Conklin Akbari	medievalist	2019	current	
James W. Alexander	topologist	1933	1951	
Andreas E. Z. Alföldi	historian and archaeologist	1956	1965	Emeritus 1965-1981
Danielle S. Allen	political theorist	2007	2015	
Nima Arkani-Hamed	particle physicist	2008	current	
Michael F. Atiyah	mathematician	1969	1972	
John N. Bahcall	astrophysicist	1971	2005	
Arne K. A. Beurling	mathematician	1954	1973	Emeritus 1973-1986
Yve-Alain Bois	art historian	2005	current	
Enrico Bombieri	mathematician	1977	2011	Emeritus 2011-
Armand Borel	mathematician	1957	1993	Emeritus 1993-2003
Jean Bourgain	mathematician	1994	2018	
Glen W. Bowersock	historian	1980	2006	Emeritus 2006-
Wendy Brown	political theorist	2021	current	
Caroline Walker Bynum	historian	2003	2011	Emerita 2011-
Luis Caffarelli	mathematician	1986	1996	
Angelos Chaniotis	historian	2010	current	
Harold F. Cherniss	historian of philosophy	1948	1974	Emeritus 1974-1987
Marshall Clagett	historian	1964	1986	Emeritus 1986-2005
Susan E. Clark	Astrophysicist	2017	2020	
Giles Constable	historian	1985	2003	Emeritus 2003-
Patricia Crone	historian	1997	2015	
José Cutileiro	historian and diplomat	2001	2004	
Roger Dashen	physicist	1969	1987	
Camillo De Lellis	mathematician	2019	current	
Pierre Deligne	mathematician	1984	2007	Emeritus 2008-
Nicola Di Cosmo	historian	2003	current	
Robbert Dijkgraaf	mathematical physicist	2012	current	Director 2012-2022
Freeman Dyson	physicist and mathematician	1953	1994	Emeritus 1994-2020
Edward M. Earle	politics: military foreign affairs	1934	1954	
Albert Einstein	theoretical physicist	1933	1946	Emeritus 1946-1955
John Huxtable Elliott	historian	1973	1990	
Didier Fassin	anthropologist	2009	current	
Patrick J. Geary	historian	2012	2019	Emeritus 2019-
Clifford Geertz	anthropologist	1970	2000	Emeritus 2000-2006
Felix Gilbert	historian	1962	1975	Emeritus 1975-1991
James F. Gilliam	historian	1965	1985	Emeritus 1985-1990
Peter Goddard	mathematical physicist	2004	2016	Director 2004-2012, Professor 2012-2016, Emeritus 2016-
Kurt Gödel	mathematician	1953	1976	Emeritus 1976-1978
Hetty Goldman	archaeologist	1936	1947	Emeritus 1947-1972
Peter Goldreich	astrophysicist	2004	2009	Emeritus 2009-
Oleg Grabar	historian	1990	1998	Emeritus 1998-2011
Phillip A. Griffiths	mathematician	1991	2009	Director 1991-2003, Professor 2004-2009, Emeritus 2009-
Christian Habicht	historian	1973	1998	Emeritus 1998-2018
Harish-Chandra	mathematician	1968	1983	
Jonathan Haslam	historian	2015	current	George F. Kennan Professor
Ernst Herzfeld	archeologist and Iranologist	1936	1944	
Albert O. Hirschman	political scientist	1974	1985	Emeritus 1985-2012
Helmut Hofer	mathematician	2009	current	
Lars V. Hörmander	mathematician	1964	1968	
Piet Hut	astrophysicist	1985	current	
Jonathan Israel	historian	2001	2016	Emeritus 2016-
Myles W. Jackson	historian of science	2018	current	
Ernst H. Kantorowicz	historian	1951	1963	
George F. Kennan	historian	1953	1974	Emeritus 1974-2005
Robert P. Langlands	mathematician	1972	2007	Emeritus 2007-
Irving Lavin	art historian	1973	2001	Emeritus 2001-2019
Tsung-Dao Lee	physicist	1960	1962	
Stanislas Leibler	physicist and biologist	2009	current	
Arnold J. Levine	biologist	2004	2011	Emeritus 2011-
Elias A. Lowe	paleographer	1936	1945	Emeritus 1945-1969
Jacob Lurie	mathematician	2019	current	
Robert MacPherson	mathematician	1994	2018	Emeritus 2018-
Juan Maldacena	theoretical physicist	2002	current	
Avishai Margalit	philosopher	2006	2011	George F. Kennan Professor
Eric Maskin	economic theorist	2000	2011	
Jack F. Matlock, Jr.	historian	1996	2001	
Millard Meiss	art historian	1958	1974	Emeritus 1974-1975
Benjamin D. Meritt	historian	1935	1969	Emeritus 1969-1989
John W. Milnor	mathematician	1970	1990	
David Mitrany	political scientist	1933	1953	
Deane Montgomery	mathematician	1951	1980	Emeritus 1980-1992
Marston Morse	mathematician	1935	1962	Emeritus 1962-1977
Alondra Nelson	social scientist	2019	current	
J. Robert Oppenheimer	physicist	1947	1966	Director 1947-1966
Abraham Pais	physicist	1950	1963	
Erwin Panofsky	art historian	1935	1962	Emeritus 1962-1968
Peter Paret	historian	1986	1997	Emeritus 1997-
Tullio E. Regge	physicist	1965	1981	
Winfield W. Riefler	economist	1935	1949	
Dani Rodrik	political economist	2013	2015	
Marshall N. Rosenbluth	physicist	1967	1982	
Tim Roughgarden	mathematician	2026	current	
Peter Sarnak	mathematician	2007	current	
Sabine Schmidtke	historian	2014	current	
Joan Wallach Scott	gender historian	1985	2014	Emerita 2014-
Nathan Seiberg	theoretical physicist	1997	current	
Atle Selberg	mathematician	1951	1987	Emeritus 1987-2007
Kenneth M. Setton	medieval historian	1968	1984	Emeritus 1984-1995
Carl L. Siegel	mathematician	1945	1951	
Thomas Spencer	mathematician	1986	current	
Walter W. Stewart	economist	1938	1950	Emeritus 1950-1958
James Stone	computational astrophysicist	2019	current	
Bengt G. D. Strömgren	astronomer and astrophysicist	1957	1967	
Richard Taylor	mathematician	2012	2018	
Homer Thompson	archeologist	1947	1977	Emeritus 1977-2000
Scott Tremaine	astrophysicist	2007	current	
Francesca Trivellato	historian	2018	current	
Misha Tsodyks	theoretical neuroscientist	2019	current	
Kirk Varnedoe	art historian	2002	2003	
Oswald Veblen	mathematician	1932	1950	Emeritus 1950-1960
Akshay Venkatesh	mathematician	2018	current	
Vladimir Voevodsky	mathematician	2002	2017	
John von Neumann	mathematician	1933	1955	
Heinrich von Staden	historian	1998	2010	Emeritus 2010-
Michael Walzer	philosopher of politics and ethics	1980	2007	Emeritus 2007-
Robert B. Warren	economist	1939	1950	
André Weil	mathematician	1958	1976	Emeritus 1976-1998
Hermann Weyl	mathematician	1933	1951	Emeritus 1951-1955
Morton White	philosopher and historian of ideas	1970	1987	Emeritus 1987-2016
Hassler Whitney	mathematician	1952	1977	Emeritus 1977-1989
Avi Wigderson	mathematician	1999	current	
Frank Wilczek	physicist	1989	2000	
Edward Witten	mathematical physicist	1987	2022	Emeritus 2022-
Ernest Llewellyn Woodward	historian	1951	1960	Emeritus 1961-1971
C. N. Yang	physicist	1955	1966	
Shing-Tung Yau	mathematician	1980	1984	
Matias Zaldarriaga	astrophysicist	2009	current	
