= David Mitrany =

Romanian-British historian and political scientist (1888–1975)

David Mitrany (1888–1975) was a Romanian-born, naturalized British scholar, historian and political theorist. The richest source of information concerning Mitrany’s life and intellectual activity are the memoirs he published in 1975 in The Functional Theory of Politics.

== Professional life ==
On 1 September 1933 Mitrany joined the original faculty of the School of Economics and Politics at the Institute for Advanced Study (IAS) in Princeton, New Jersey where he served along with Edward M. Earle, Winfield W. Riefler, Walter W. Stewart, and Robert B. Warren. He left the IAS in 1953.

Mitrany worked on international relations and on issues of the Danube region. He is considered as the creator of the theory of functionalism in international relations, also classified as a part of liberal institutionalism (see Liberalism).

Mitrany pioneered modern integrative theory. This discipline is the third main liberal approach to international relations (along with international liberalism and idealism). Its basic principle maintains that international (not only economical) cooperation is the best means of softening antagonism in the international environment. The idea of this international cooperation was elaborated upon by Leonard Hobhouse, and then by Leonard Woolf and G. D. H. Cole. The main rationale behind it was that “peace is more than the absence of violence”. Cornelia Navari wrote that the British pluralist doctrine had become the lifeblood of Mitrany’s theory.

Following a series of conferences held at Harvard and Yale, he published two of his theoretical studies concerning the international system, The Political Consequences of Economic Planning and The Progress of International Government. The first public presentation of his functionalist approach to international relations occurred during a series of conferences held at Yale University in 1932. Mitrany got famous eventually with his pamphlet A Working Peace System of 1943.

Anti-Federalism: Mitrany controverted illusionary federation projects according to Coudenhove-Kalergi and others, which could hinder a quick and effective re-establishment of peace.

The “European” federalists have been so fascinated by a readily convenient formula that they have neither asked how it works where it exists, nor whether its origins bear any relation to the problem of uniting a group of states in the present social ambience.

Claim for functional agencies: Instead of those federation projects Mitrany recommended lean functional agencies for the execution of international cooperation on all issue-related, mainly technical and economic sectors. But Mitrany’s functionalism also referred to intrastate combinations: to special-purpose associations like the Tennessee Valley Authority or the London Transport Board, in which partly independent union states or co-equal municipal authorities coordinated their interests. And Mitrany listed private cartels, e.g. the former rationalization cartels of the British shipping, cotton and steel industry, among his functional agencies. In his argumentation it can be noticed the presence of elements inspired by his liberal pluralist contemporaries.

The working peace system was built around international agencies. They had functional responsibilities in managing those problems for which there was a consensus to cooperate. These international agencies were to assume some of the attributions of nation-states, within the so-called ramification process which involved a constant transfer of functions and authority from states to agencies. The phenomenon in question made no distinction between protagonists. The consequence of ramification was a domino effect, as cooperation in one field could lead to a new cooperation in another field.

The best known tenet of political functionalism form follows function does actually not originate from Mitrany, but from the functionalism of industrial design. It was just used to popularize Mitrany’s concept.

== See also ==
- Neofunctionalism
- Functionalism in international relations
- Liberalism

== Selected bibliography ==
Works of David Mitrany

- Forbes, Nevill; Toynbee, Arnold J.; Mitrany, D.; Hogarth, D. G. (1915). "Rumania: Her History and Politics". The Balkans: A History of Bulgaria, Serbia, Greece, Rumania, Turkey. Oxford: At the Clarendon Press – via Internet Archive.
- Greater Romania: a Study in National Ideals (1917)
- The Problem of International Sanctions (1925)
- The Land and the Peasant in Romania: the War and Agrarian Reform, 1917-1921 (1930)
- The Progress of International Government (1933)
- The Effect of the War in South Eastern Europe (1936)
- A Working Peace System (1943)
- The Road to Security (1944)
- American Interpretations (1946)
- World Unity and the Nations (1950)
- Marx Against the Peasant: A Study in Social Dogmatism (1951)
- Food and Freedom (1954)
- The Prospect of European Integration: Federal or Functional, Journal of Common Market Studies, 1965
- The Functional Theory of Politics. New York: St. Martin's Press., 1975.

Works on David Mitrany

- Mihai Alexandrescu, David Mitrany during the First World War. Some Ambiguities in His Biography, in: SUBB - Historia, 62 (2017), No. 2, pp. 48-59, (doi: 10.24193/subbhis.2017.2.04).
- Jens Steffek, The cosmopolitanism of David Mitrany: Equality, devolution and functional democracy beyond the state, in: International Relations, 29 (2015), No. 1, pp. 23-44.
- Mihai Alexandrescu, Functionalismul si Sistemul International (David Mitrany)/Functionalism and International System (David Mitrany), Eikon, Cluj-Napoca, 2010
- Mihai Alexandrescu, David Mitrany. From Federalism to Functionalism, in: Transylvanian Review, 16 (2007), No. 1.
- Mihai Alexandrescu, David Mitrany. Viaţa şi opera, în Nicolae Păun (coord.), Actualitatea mesajului fondatorilor Uniunii Europene, EFES, Cluj-Napoca, 2006
- Mihai Alexandrescu, Câteva date de demografie a României de la începutul secolului al XX-lea, prezentate de David Mitrany, în Ioan Bolovan, Cornelia Mureşan, Mihaela Hărănguş, Perspective demografice, istorice şi sociologice. Studii de populaţie, Presa Universitară Clujeană, 2008
- Gerhard Michael Ambrosi, David Mitranys Funktionalismus als analytische Grundlage wirtschaftlicher und politischer Neuordnungen in Europa, in Harald Hageman (Hg.): Die deutschsprachige wirtschaftswisseschaftliche Emigration nach 1933, Metropolis-Verlag, Marburg, 1996.
- Gerhard Michael Ambrosi, Keynes and Mitrany as instigators of European Governance, in Millenium III, No. 12/13, Summer 2005
- Anderson, Dorothy (October 1998). "David Mitrany (1888-1975). An appreciation of his life and work". Review of International Studies. 24 (4): 577–592. doi:10.1017/s0260210598005774. JSTOR 20097553. S2CID 143505977.
- Lucian Ashworth, Creating International Studies. Angell, Mitrany and the Liberal Tradition, Aldershot 1999.
- Per A. Hammarlund, Liberal Internationalism and the Decline of the State. The Thought of Richard Cobden, David Mitrany, and Kenichi Ohmae, New York 2005.
- Cornelia Navari, David Mitrany and International Functionalism, in David Long and Peter Wilson (ed.) Thinkers of the Twenty Years’ Crisis. Inter-War Idealism Reassessed, Clarendon Press, Oxford, 1995

== Sources ==
- Catalogue of the Mitrany papers at the Archives Division of the London School of Economics.
