= Michael N. Barnett =

American international relations professor (born 1960)

- Born: Michael Nathan Barnett; November 10, 1960 (age 66)
- Occupations: Elliott School of International Affairs, The George Washington University professor; Constructivist theorist and author

Michael Nathan Barnett (born November 10, 1960) is a professor of international relations at George Washington University's Elliott School of International Affairs. Known for his Constructivist approach, his scholarship and research has been in the areas of international organizations, international relations theory, and Middle Eastern politics.

In 2010, Barnett was named University Professor of International Affairs and Political Science at George Washington University. He is considered among the most influential IR scholars. His study "Power in International Politics" (co-authored with Raymond Duvall) is among the most assigned work in international relations graduate training at American universities.

== Career ==
He received his B.A. from the University of Illinois and his Ph.D. at the University of Minnesota. As he worked towards his undergraduate degree at the University of Illinois he worked as a storm chaser in Illinois and the greater Midwest area.

He has taught at the University of Minnesota, the University of Wisconsin, Macalester College, Wellesley College, and the Hebrew University of Jerusalem. Additionally, he was a visiting scholar at the New School for Social Research and the Dayan Center at Tel Aviv University, and he was a visiting professor at the Graduate Institute of International Studies in Geneva, Switzerland. Most recently, Barnett held the Harold Stassen Chair of International Affairs in the Hubert H. Humphrey School of Public Affairs and Professor of Political Science at the University of Minnesota.

His most recent books are "Paternalism beyond Borders," Cambridge University Press, 2016; Empire of Humanity: A History of Humanitarianism, Cornell University Press, 2011; Humanitarianism Contested: Where Angels Fear to Tread, with Thomas G. Weiss, Routledge, 2011; and Sacred Aid: Faith and Humanitarianism, with Janice Stein (eds.) Oxford University Press, 2012. With Emanuel Adler, he reintroduced the concept of security community to international relations.

In Rules for the World (co-authored with Martha Finnemore), Barnett argue that international organizations derive power and autonomy from their rational-legal authority and control of information. International organizations are therefore purposive social agents that can act inconsistently with the intentions of the founders of the organizations (which are often states). In contrast to some realist and liberal theories of international relations, Barnett and Finnemore show that international organizations are not just a reflection of state interests and that they do not necessarily act efficiently. International organizations can develop bureaucratic cultures that result in adverse outcomes (what they call "pathologies"). They list five mechanisms that breed organizational pathologies:

1. Irrationality of rationalization: when an organization sticks to existing rules and procedures regardless of circumstances rather than act in ways most appropriate for the circumstances
2. Universalism: the application of universal rules and categories may not reflect specific contexts
3. Normalization of deviance: deviations from existing rules can become normalized and lead to aberrational behaviors
4. Organizational insulation: when organizations do not get feedback from the environment about their performance and are unable to update their behavior
5. Cultural contestation: different cultures within an organization may lead to clashes that produce adverse outcomes

He is known for his study "Power in International Politics" (co-authored with Raymond Duvall), which is among the most assigned work in international relations graduate training at American universities. The study presents four forms of power:

1. Compulsory Power: direct control by one actor over another actor
2. Institutional Power: control exercised by actors indirectly over other actors through diffuse relations of interaction
3. Structural Power: the constitution of subjects' capacities in direct structural relation to one another
4. Productive Power: the socially diffuse production of subjectivity (through discursive practices) in systems of meaning and signification

Barnett consistently ranks as one of the top-20 scholars "who has done the most interesting work in international relations in recent years" according to the yearly TRIP surveys.

== Bibliography ==
Books

- 2023 Israel and the One State Reality: What is Israel/ Palestine? Cornell University Press. Co-Edited with Nathan Brown, Marc Lynch, and Shibley Telhami. Cornell UniversityPress.
- 2022 Global Governance in a World of Change. Cambridge University Press. Edited with Jon Pevehouse and Kal Raustiala
- 2020 Human Rights and Humanitarianism: A World of Differences? Edited. Cambridge University Press.
- 2017 Paternalism Beyond Borders. Edited. Cambridge University Press.
- 2016 The Star and Stripes: A History of the Foreign Policies of American Jews. Princeton University Press.
- 2016 New “Afterword” to Eyewitness to a Genocide: The United Nations and Rwanda. Cornell University Press.
- 2012 Sacred Aid: Faith and Humanitarianism. Co-edited with Janice Stein. Oxford University Press.
- 2011 The Empire of Humanity: A History of Humanitarianism. Cornell University Press.
- 2011 Humanitarianism Contested: Where Angels Fear to Tread. With Tom Weiss. Routledge Press.
- 2010 The International Humanitarian Order. Routledge Press.
- 2008 Humanitarianism in Question: Politics, Power, and Ethics. Co-edited with Tom Weiss. Cornell University Press.
- 2005 Power and Global Governance. Co-edited with Raymond Duvall. Cambridge University Press.
- 2004 Rules for the World: International Organizations in World Politics. With Martha Finnemore. Cornell University Press.
- 2002 Eyewitness to a Genocide: The United Nations and Rwanda. Cornell University Press.
- 2002 National Identity and Foreign Policy in the Middle East. Cornell University Press. Co-edited with Shibley Telhami.
- 1998 Dialogues in Arab Politics: Negotiations in Regional Order. Columbia University Press.
- 1998 Security Communities. Cambridge University Press. Co-edited with Emanuel Adler.
- 1996 Israel in Comparative Politics: Challenging the Conventional Wisdom. Edited. State University of New York Press.
- 1992 Confronting the Costs of War: Military Power, State, and Society in Egypt and Israel. Princeton University Press.

Articles

- 2023 Israel and the One State Reality: What is Israel/ Palestine? Cornell University Press. Co-Edited with Nathan Brown, Marc Lynch, and Shibley Telhami. Cornell University Press.
- 2022 Global Governance in a World of Change. Cambridge University Press. Edited with Jon Pevehouse and Kal Raustiala
- 2020 Human Rights and Humanitarianism: A World of Differences? Edited. Cambridge University Press.
- 2017 Paternalism Beyond Borders. Edited. Cambridge University Press.
- 2016 The Star and Stripes: A History of the Foreign Policies of American Jews. Princeton University Press.
- 2012 Sacred Aid: Faith and Humanitarianism. Co-edited with Janice Stein. Oxford University Press.
- 2011 The Empire of Humanity: A History of Humanitarianism. Cornell University Press.
- 2011 Humanitarianism Contested: Where Angels Fear to Tread. With Tom Weiss. Routledge Press.
- 2010 The International Humanitarian Order. Routledge Press.
- 2008 Humanitarianism in Question: Politics, Power, and Ethics. Co-edited with Tom Weiss. Cornell University Press.
- 2005 Power and Global Governance. Co-edited with Raymond Duvall. Cambridge University Press.
- 2004 Rules for the World: International Organizations in World Politics. With Martha Finnemore. Cornell University Press.
- 2002 Eyewitness to a Genocide: The United Nations and Rwanda. Cornell University Press. Choice Magazine Outstanding Academic Title (New “Afterword” added to 2016 edition).
- 2002 National Identity and Foreign Policy in the Middle East. Cornell University Press. Co-edited with Shibley Telhami.
- 1998 Dialogues in Arab Politics: Negotiations in Regional Order. Columbia University Press.
- 1998 Security Communities. Cambridge University Press. Co-edited with Emanuel Adler.
- 1996 Israel in Comparative Politics: Challenging the Conventional Wisdom. Edited. State University of New York Press.
- 1992 Confronting the Costs of War: Military Power, State, and Society in Egypt and Israel. Princeton University Press.
