= Alec Stone Sweet =

American political scientist and jurist

- Education: Western Washington University (BA); Paul H. Nitze School of Advanced International Studies (MA); University of Washington (PhD)
- Scientific career
- Fields: Political science and law
- Workplaces: Yale Law School; National University of Singapore; The University of Hong Kong

Alec Stone Sweet is an American political scientist and jurist. He is Professor and Chair of Comparative and International Law at The University of Hong Kong.

== Scholarship ==
Stone Sweet graduated from Western Washington University (BA, Political Science), the Johns Hopkins SAIS (MA, International Relations), and the University of Washington (Ph.D., Political Science).

In January 2016, Stone Sweet became the first Saw Swee Hock Centennial Professor in Law, a tenured full-time position at National University of Singapore Law, leaving his tenured position at Yale in order to focus on Asian law and institutions and to be close to the Singapore International Mediation Institute (SIMI) and the new Singapore International Commercial Court. From 2004 to 2014, he was Leitner Professor of Law, Politics, and International Studies at the Yale Law School. Prior to Yale, he was Official Fellow and Chair of Comparative Government at Nuffield College (1998–2005), and Professor of Political Science at the University of California, Irvine (1991–1998). He has also taught in universities in France, India, Italy, the Netherlands, Spain, and Sweden.

Stone Sweet works in the fields of comparative and international politics, comparative and international law, and European integration. He has published eleven books and edited volumes, and more than 70 papers, including in the American Journal of Sociology, the American Political Science Review, Comparative Political Studies, West European Politics, the International Journal of Constitutional Law, the Journal of European Public Policy, and the Revue Française de Science Politique. Many of the most important papers are freely available on his Selected Works site.

Stone Sweet's research has had broad influence in both law and the social sciences. The 1996 paper, "Judicialization and the Construction of Governance" (published in 1999) developed a theory of "judicialization," explaining how judicial power emerges, institutionalizes, and impacts on markets and politics. The paper also made an important contribution to new institutional thinking in the social sciences, showing how rationalist and more sociological or constructivist approaches could (or must) be blended to explain macro-institutional change. Stone Sweet is also credited (through the books, The Birth of Judicial Politics in France, and Governing with Judges) with reviving the study of comparative constitutional law, which is now a thriving area of research. Indeed, he has been called the "Contemporary Godfather of Comparative Constitutional Law." In his research on the evolution of the European Union, he partnered with Wayne Sandholtz and Neil Fligstein to update Ernst Haas' theory of integration, called neofunctionalism. and to test it against rival theories. This work (especially the books, European Integration and Supranational Governance, The Institutionalization of Europe, and The Judicial Construction of Europe) demonstrated that integration proceeded as the activities of market actors, lobbyists, legislators, and judges became connected to one another. "These linkages, in turn, produced a self-reinforcing, causal system that has driven integration and given the EU its fundamentally expansionary character." The research also showed that intergovernmentalist theories of European integration – which emphasized the centrality of State officials and their preferences, and downplayed transnational and supranational actors – were seriously flawed, failing to explain many of the most important market and political developments. His most recent work concerns human rights, and the constitutionalization of international regimes.

== Music and sports ==
Stone Sweet has recorded three CDs, including Memory and Praise: Acoustic Guitar Solos (Appleseed and Solid Air), and Tumblin' Gap: Clawhammer Guitar Solos (Solid Air).

Memory and Praise contains Irish harp, bagpipe, and dance tunes, as well as the first solos ever recorded in clawhammer guitar style [needs citation], two medleys of Appalachian fiddle tunes played in clawhammer style. In 2001, it was one of five recordings nominated for a 2001 Indie Award – the Best Acoustic Instrumental category. Eric Schoenberg called it "as beautiful a solo guitar recording as I have ever heard." Jody Stecher praised the "extraordinary guitar playing, resembling no one else in touch, technique, or feel." Stone Sweet was featured in an article on Celtic Guitar by Acoustic Guitar, where he discusses dance tunes, guitar tunings, and influences on his playing.

In Tumblin' Gap, Stone Sweet plays Appalachian and Celtic music using the Clawhammer style that he developed from old time banjo playing. The album was named one of the top ten recordings of 2005 by several critics and radio stations. In its review, Acoustic Guitar described the CD as follows: "Entrancing, the rhythmic sense and phrasing are spot on. Compulsory listening for guitar fans, Tumblin' Gap is the kind of surprising recording that inspires new movements." Bill Hicks, in his review for the Old Time Herald, wrote that: "Alec Stone Sweet is a guitar virtuoso ... [his new] record would serve to explain to the uninitiated just why we care so much about these old melodies, about just what a tune is really about." Stone Sweet explains how he developed and uses Clawhammer techniques on his guitar page.

Stone Sweet plays competitive Pétanque.

== Selected books ==
- Stone Sweet, Alec (1992). The birth of judicial politics in France: the Constitutional Council in comparative perspective. New York: Oxford University Press. ISBN 9780195070347. Details.
- Stone Sweet, Alec; Sandholtz, Wayne, eds. (1998). European integration and supranational governance. Oxford New York: Oxford University Press. ISBN 9780198294641. Details.
- Stone Sweet, Alec (2000). Governing with judges constitutional politics in Europe. Oxford New York: Oxford University Press. ISBN 9780198297307. Details.
- Stone Sweet, Alec; Sandholtz, Wayne; Fligstein, Neil, eds. (2001). The institutionalization of Europe. Oxford New York: Oxford University Press. ISBN 9780199247950. Details.
- Stone Sweet, Alec; Thatcher, Mark, eds. (2003). The politics of delegation. London Portland, Oregon: Frank Cass. ISBN 9780714684437.
- Stone Sweet, Alec; Shapiro, Martin (2002). On law, politics, and judicialization. Oxford New York: Oxford University Press. ISBN 9780199256471. Details.
- Stone Sweet, Alec (2004). The judicial construction of Europe. Oxford New York: Oxford University Press. ISBN 9780199275526. Details.
- Stone Sweet, Alec; Keller, Helen, eds. (2008). A Europe of rights: the impact of the ECHR on national legal systems. Oxford New York: Oxford University Press. ISBN 9780199535262. Details.
