= Ernst B. Haas =

American political scientist

Ernst Bernard Haas
- Born: 1924; Frankfurt, Germany
- Died: March 6, 2003 (aged 78–79)
- Education: Columbia University
- Occupation: Political scientist
- Known for: Neofunctionalism
- Spouse: Hildegarde Vogel Haas
- Children: Peter M. Haas
- Scientific career
- Doctoral students: David D. Laitin Emanuel Adler

Ernst Bernard Haas (March 31, 1924 – March 6, 2003) was an American political scientist who was known for his contributions to international relations theory. He was the Robson Professor of Government at the political science department of the University of California, Berkeley.

He was a leading authority on international relations theory, and was the founder of neofunctionalism.

Haas was a fellow of the American Academy of Arts and Sciences, and acted as a consultant to many national and international organizations.

== Early life ==
Haas was born in Frankfurt, Germany, in 1924 to a secular Jewish family. He emigrated to the United States in 1938 due to the rise of antisemitism in Germany.

He attended the University of Chicago and then worked in the U.S. Army Military Intelligence Service from 1943 to 1946 where he studied Japanese and Japanese weapons.

Following the war he studied at Columbia University, where he received his BS, followed by an MA. It was there, too, that he gained his PhD in public law and government in 1952.

== Academic career ==
Haas: ...the one theme that sort of underlies everything I've done... is the conditions under which the state as we understand it disappears, disintegrates, weakens, changes... why the interest in the state? Because I grew up under a system of an extraordinarily powerful state that victimized me, So my idea was; how in the future do we get rid of states of that kind?

— From Conversations with History, February 2002

Haas began his academic career in 1951 at UC Berkeley, where he remained until his death.

He was director of the UC Berkeley Institute for International Studies from 1969 to 1973.

He was Robson Professor of Government in the University of California, Berkeley, political science department. After he retired in June 1999, he continued as a researcher and teacher at Berkeley.

He supervised many graduate students who also went on to successful careers. He influenced John Ruggie.

=== Main interests ===
Haas was mainly interested in international integration. Haas realized that traditional European politics could be dramatically changed by liberalizing movement of goods capital, and persons, but his analysis differed significantly from classical liberalism. Haas was influenced by contemporary sociologists, as well as the works of Max Weber.

He is the founder of neofunctionalism as an approach to the study of integration. Neofunctionalism recognizes the importance of national states but also stresses the roles of regional interest groups and the bureaucracy of regional organizations. Though the member states create the initial conditions, regional interest groups and international bureaucrats push the process forward, and national governments increasingly solve conflicts of interest by conferring more authority on the regional organizations, and citizens increasingly look to the regional organization for solutions to their problems.

Haas was a critic of realist international relations theory.

== Private life ==
Haas was married to the late Hildegarde Vogel Haas for 57 years. He had a son, Peter M. Haas, who is a professor of political science at the University of Massachusetts-Amherst.

== Works ==
Haas published numerous books, monographs and articles.

In 1997, The Uniting of Europe was chosen as one of the 50 most significant books in international relations in the twentieth century by the journal Foreign Affairs.

His works include:

- Haas, Ernst B. 1952. The reconciliation of conflicting colonial policy aims: acceptance of the League of Nations mandate system. Int. Organ. 6(4):521–36
- Haas, Ernst B. 1953. The balance of power as a guide to policy-making. J. Polit. 15(3):370–98
- Haas, Ernst B. 1958. The Uniting of Europe. Stanford: Stanford Univ. Press
- Haas, Ernst B. 1961. International integration: the European and the universal process. Int. Organ. 15(3):366–92
- Haas, Ernst B. 1964. Beyond the Nation State. Stanford: Stanford Univ. Press
- Haas, Ernst B. 1970. Human Rights and International Action. Stanford: Stanford Univ. Press
- Haas, Ernst B. 1978. Global Evangelism Rides Again: How to Protect Human Rights Without Really Trying. Univ. Calif. Policy Pap. No. 5, Berkeley, CA
- Haas, Ernst B. 1990. When Knowledge is Power: Three Models of Change in International Organizations. Berkeley: Univ. Calif. Press
- Haas, Ernst B. 1993. Beware the Slippery Slope: Notes Toward the Definition of Justifiable Intervention. Univ. Calif., Inst. Int. Stud. Policy Pap. No. 42, Berkeley, CA
- Haas, Ernst B. 1997. Nationalism, Liberalism and Progress. Vol. 1. The Rise and Decline of Nationalism. Ithaca, NY: Cornell Univ. Press
- Haas, Ernst B. 2000. Nationalism, Liberalism and Progress. Vol. 2. The Dismal Fate of New Nations. Ithaca, NY: Cornell Univ. Press
- Haas, Ernst B. 2004. The Uniting of Europe. University of Notre Dame Press, new edition of the 1958 book with a new introduction of E.B. Haas (= pdf-download of text in der edition "100 books" of the European Parliament)
