= Neofunctionalism =

Political theory

Neofunctionalism is a theory of regional integration which downplays globalisation and reintroduces territory into its governance. Neofunctionalism is often regarded as the first European integration theory developed by Ernst B. Haas in 1958 as part of his PhD research on the European Coal and Steel Community. Neofunctionalism seeks to explain the European integration process and why states accept to become a part of supranational organization. Jean Monnet's approach to European integration, which aimed at integrating individual sectors in hopes of achieving spillover effects to further the process of integration, is said to have followed the neofunctional school's tack.

Ernst B. Haas, later declared the theory of neofunctionalism obsolete, a statement he revoked in his final book, after the process of European integration started stalling in the 1960s, when Charles de Gaulle's "Empty Chair" politics paralyzed the institutions of the European Coal and Steel Community, European Economic Community, and European Atomic Energy Community. The theory was updated and further specified namely by Wayne Sandholtz, Alec Stone Sweet, and their collaborators in the 1990s and in the 2000s (references below). The main contributions of these authors was an employment of empiricism.

After the Maastricht Treaty, neo-functionalism evolved to include new perspectives: ‘legal integration theories,’ ‘institutionalist approaches,’ the ‘constructivist sociohistorical approach,’ and ‘neo-neo-functionalism.’ While not all of these approaches explicitly identify as neo-functionalist, they have refined the original theory to better explain the decision-making processes and the expansion of supranational governance within European integration. This reflects the continued relevance and adaptation of neo-functionalism in understanding how states engage with and support supranational organizations, particularly within the context of European integration.

Today, neofunctionalism is one of the best-known theories of European integration. In the last decades Haas' theory has been revived by several authors, who describe the neofunctionalist theoretical legacy left by him as able to speak directly to current EU studies and comparative regionalism, if it is seen as a dynamic theory that corresponds to established social scientific norms with disciplinary openness. Moreover, it frequently draws upon interdisciplinary perspectives, integrating insights from economics, psychology, and cultural studies to enrich the analysis of political phenomena, often using European integration as a primary laboratory for examining the social integration of political entities.

== Key theoretical arguments ==
Neofunctionalism describes and explains the process of regional integration with reference to how three causal factors interact:

- Growing economic interdependence between nations
- Organizational capacity to resolve disputes and build international legal regimes
- Supranational market rules that replace national regulatory regimes

Early neofunctionalist theory assumed a decline in importance of nationalism and the nation-state; it predicted that, gradually, elected officials, interest groups, and large commercial interests within states would see it in their interests to pursue welfarist objectives best satisfied by the political and market integration at a higher, supranational level. Haas theorized three mechanisms that he thought would drive the integration forward: positive spillover, the transfer of domestic allegiances and technocratic automaticity.

- Positive spillover effect is the notion that integration between states in one economic sector will create strong incentives for integration in further sectors, in order to fully capture the perks of integration in the sector in which it started.
- Increased number of transactions and intensity of negotiations then takes place hand in hand with increasing regional integration. This leads to a creation of institutions that work without reference to "local" governments.
- The mechanism of a transfer in domestic allegiances can be best understood by first noting that an important assumption within neofunctionalist thinking is of a pluralistic society within the relevant nation states. Neofunctionalists claim that as the process of integration gathers pace, interest groups and associations will transfer their allegiances away from national institutions towards the supranational European institutions. They will do this because they will, in theory, come to realise that these newly formed institutions are a better conduit through which to pursue their material interests.
- Greater regulatory complexity is then needed and other institutions on regional level are usually called for. This causes integration to be transferred to higher levels of decision-making processes.
- Technocratic automaticity described the way in which, as integration proceeds, the supranational institutions set up to oversee that integration process will themselves take the lead in sponsoring further integration as they become more powerful and more autonomous of the member states. In the Haas-Schmitter model, size of unit, rate of transactions, pluralism, and elite complementarity are the background conditions on which the process of integration depends.
- Just as Rosamond put it, political integration will then become an "inevitable" side effect of integration in economic sectors.

Neofunctionalism was modified and updated in two important books that helped to revive the study of European integration: European Integration and Supranational Governance (1998) by Wayne Sandholtz and Alec Stone Sweet, and The Institutionalization of Europe (2001) by Sandholtz, Stone Sweet, and Neil Fligstein. Sandholtz and Stone Sweet describe and assess the evolution of Neofunctionalist theory and empirical research in their 2009 paper, Neo-functionalism and Supranational Governance.

== Critiques of Neofunctionalism ==
=== Empirical level ===
Despite its profound insights in regional integration, neofunctionalism is widely criticized at an empirical level for failing to account the reality of the European Communities. Neofunctionalism predicts a progressive political integration, but such a development did not occur in the 1970s. The absence or the slow pace of regional integration in Western Europe throughout the 1970s and early 1980s has been the focus of the critique. The French boycott of the European institutions in the mid-1960s, led by then French President Charles de Gaulle's "Empty Chair" policy, had led to recognize the importance of political leaders as constraints on the integration process. The neofunctionalists have acknowledged that "de Gaulle has proved us wrong".

Haas also talked about "spillback", a disintegrative equivalent to spillover. Brexit can be regarded as an example of spillback process in the EU. Neofunctionalist framework does not predict that a major country chooses to leave the EU. However, neofunctionalism scholars may argue that spillback processes are often followed by spillovers, that crises are opportunities to further integrate in the long run. As Jean Monnet famously puts in his memoirs, "Europe will be forged in crises and will be the sum of the solutions adopted for those crises".

=== Theoretical level ===
On theoretical grounds, Intergovernmentalism is a theory on European integration which rejects the neofunctionalist mechanisms of integration. Intergovernmentalism is an alternative theory of political integration that also aims to explain the integration process, where power in international organizations is possessed by the member-states and decisions are made unanimously. Independent appointees of the governments or elected representatives have solely advisory or implementational functions. Intergovernmentalism is used by most international organizations today. An alternative method of decision-making in international organizations is supranationalism.

The theory, initially proposed by Stanley Hoffmann (classical intergovernmentalism) and refined by Andrew Moravcsik (liberal intergovernmentalism) suggests that governments control the level and speed of European integration. Any increase in power at supranational level, Moravcsik argues, results from a direct decision by governments who make decisions based on a domestic agenda. The theory rejects the spillover-effect argument and the idea that supranational organisations wield political influence on par with that of national governments.

Neofunctionalists have criticized intergovernmentalism on theoretical grounds as well as on the basis of empirical evidence, which they claim demonstrates that intergovernmentalism is incapable of explaining the dynamics and trajectory of European integration.

== Sources ==
- Haas, Ernst B., ed. (2004) [1958]. The uniting of Europe: political, social, and economic forces, 1950–1957 (3rd ed.). Notre Dame, Indiana: University of Notre Dame Press. ISBN 978-0-268-04347-6.
- Rosamond, Ben (2000). Theories of European integration. New York: St. Martin's Press. ISBN 978-0-333-64717-2.
- Sandholtz, Wayne; Stone Sweet, Alec, eds. (1998). European integration and supranational governance. Oxford New York: Oxford University Press. doi:10.1093/0198294646.001.0001. ISBN 978-0-19-829464-1.
- Sandholtz, Wayne; Stone Sweet, Alec; Fligstein, Neil, eds. (2001). The institutionalization of Europe. Oxford New York: Oxford University Press. doi:10.1093/019924796X.001.0001. ISBN 978-0-19-924795-0.
- Stone Sweet, Alec (2004). The judicial construction of Europe. Oxford New York: Oxford University Press. doi:10.1093/019927553X.001.0001. ISBN 978-0-19-927552-6.
