= Peter M. Haas =

American political scientist

- Born: January 23, 1955 (age 71)

Education
- Education: Massachusetts Institute of Technology; University of Michigan

Philosophical work
- Institutions: University of Massachusetts Amherst
- Main interests: International relations

Peter M. Haas (born January 23, 1955) is a professor of Political Science at the University of Massachusetts Amherst and the Karl Deutsch Visiting Professor at the Wissenschaftszentrum Berlin.

His research concerns epistemic communities, global environmental politics, multilevel governance, and the role of science in global politics.

Haas received his undergraduate education from the University of Michigan and his Ph.D. in 1986 from the Massachusetts Institute of Technology. He has been at Amherst since 1987, and has held visiting positions at Yale University, Brown University, and Oxford University. His father, Ernst B. Haas, was also a notable political scientist.

Haas was a co-founder of the Earth System Governance Project in 2009.

== Books ==
=== Monographs ===
- Haas, Peter M. (1990), Saving the Mediterranean: The Politics of International Environmental Cooperation, Political Economy of International Change, Columbia University Press, ISBN 0-231-07012-8.
- Speth, James Gustave; Haas, Peter M. (2006), Global Environmental Governance, Foundations of Contemporary Environmental Studies, Island Press, ISBN 978-1-59726-080-0.

=== Edited volumes ===
- Haas, Peter M.; Keohane, Robert Owen; Levy, Marc A., eds. (1993), Institutions for the Earth: Sources of Effective International Environmental Protection, Global Environmental Accord: Strategies for Sustainability and Institutional Innovation (2nd ed.), MIT Press, ISBN 978-0-262-08218-1.
- Haas, Peter M., ed. (1997), Knowledge, Power, and International Policy Coordination, Studies in International Relations, University of South Carolina Press, ISBN 978-1-57003-089-5.
- Kanie, Norichika; Haas, Peter M., eds. (2004), Emerging Forces in Environmental Governance, United Nations University Press, ISBN 92-808-1095-2.
- Haas, Peter M., ed. (2008), International Environmental Governance, The Library of Essays in International Relations, 978-0754625612.
- Haas, Peter M.; Hird, John A.; McBratney, Beth, eds. (2009), Controversies in Globalization: Contending Approaches to International Relations, CQ Press, ISBN 978-0-87289-505-8.
