= Security community =

Region with rare violence

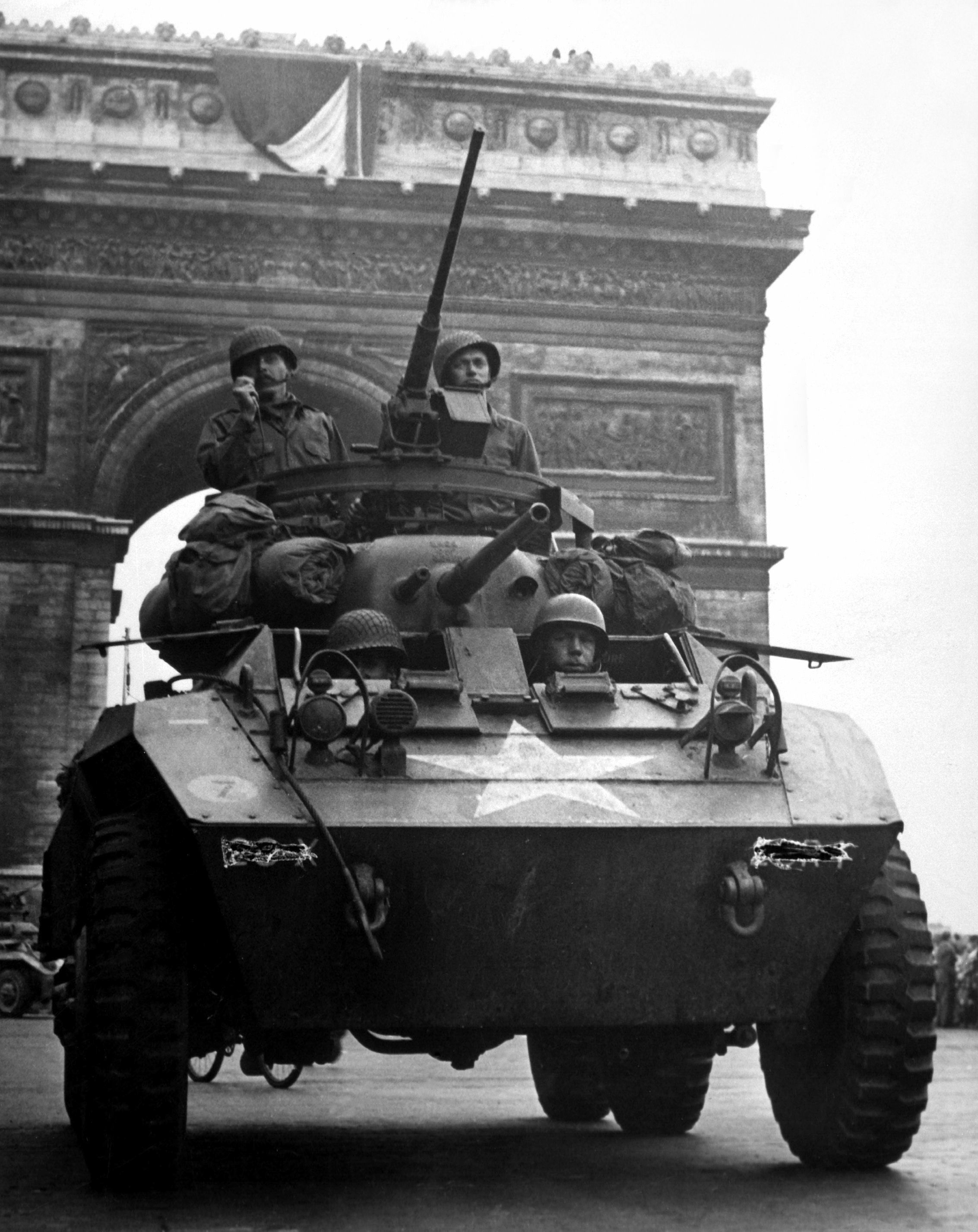
Despite a long record of armed conflicts between Germany and France, the European security community has made war between these two less likely.

A security community is a region in which a large-scale use of violence (such as war) has become very unlikely or even unthinkable. The concept of a security community is related to a group of states that enjoy relations of dependable expectations of a peace. The term was coined by the prominent political scientist Karl Deutsch in 1957. In their seminal work Political Community and the North Atlantic Area: International Organization in the Light of Historical Experience, Deutsch and his collaborators defined a security community as "a group of people" believing "that they have come to agreement on at least this one point: that common social problems must and can be resolved by processes of 'peaceful change'". Peaceful change was defined as "the resolution of social problems, normally by institutionalized procedures, without resort to large-scale physical force". People in a security community are also bound by the "sense of community", the mutual sympathy, trust, and common interests.

The concept has not become a mainstream term in the field of international security despite its long history. After the end of the Cold War, the concept of a security community was adapted by constructivist scholars. A major impetus was the book Security Communities (1998), edited by Emanuel Adler and Michael Barnett. They redefined the security community by shared identities, values, and meanings; many-sided direct interactions; and reciprocal long-term interest. Several regions of the world have been studied in the security community framework since then, most notably the European Union, the Canada–United States and Mexico–United States dyads, Mercosur, and Association of South East Asian Nations (ASEAN). Michael Haas compared the Asian and Pacific Council, Asian-Pacific Parliamentarians Union, ASEAN, Indochinese Foreign Ministers Conference, South Asian Association for Regional Cooperation, Southeast Asia Treaty Organization, and the South Pacific Forum (later renamed the Pacific Islands Forum).

== Types of security communities ==
Deutsch divided security communities into two types: the amalgamated and pluralistic ones. Amalgamated security communities are quite rare in history. They are created when two or more previously independent states form a common government. An example is the United States after the original Thirteen Colonies ceded much of their governing powers to the federal government. Amalgamation is not always successful and can be overturned, as the failed Union between Sweden and Norway exemplifies. An alternative and less ambitious process is called integration. Integration leads to a pluralistic security community, in which states retain their sovereignty. The United States with Canada is an example of a pluralistic security community. Both countries are politically independent, but they do not expect to have future military confrontations, in spite of having had some in the past. Deutsch argued that the pluralistic security communities are easier to establish and maintain than their amalgamated counterparts.

Adler and Barnett described the typical evolution of a security community from nascent to ascendant to mature. A nascent security community meets the basic expectations of peaceful change, while a mature security community is also characterized by some collective security mechanisms and supranational or transnational elements. Adler and Barnett further divided the mature security communities into "tightly" and "loosely coupled", depending on the level of their integration.

Raimo Väyrynen and Andrej Tusicisny differentiated between interstate security communities (where war between states is unlikely) and comprehensive security communities (where both interstate conflicts and civil wars are seen as unthinkable). Western Europe is a classic example of a comprehensive security community, while South East Asia is usually seen as an interstate security community.

== Conditions leading to a security community ==
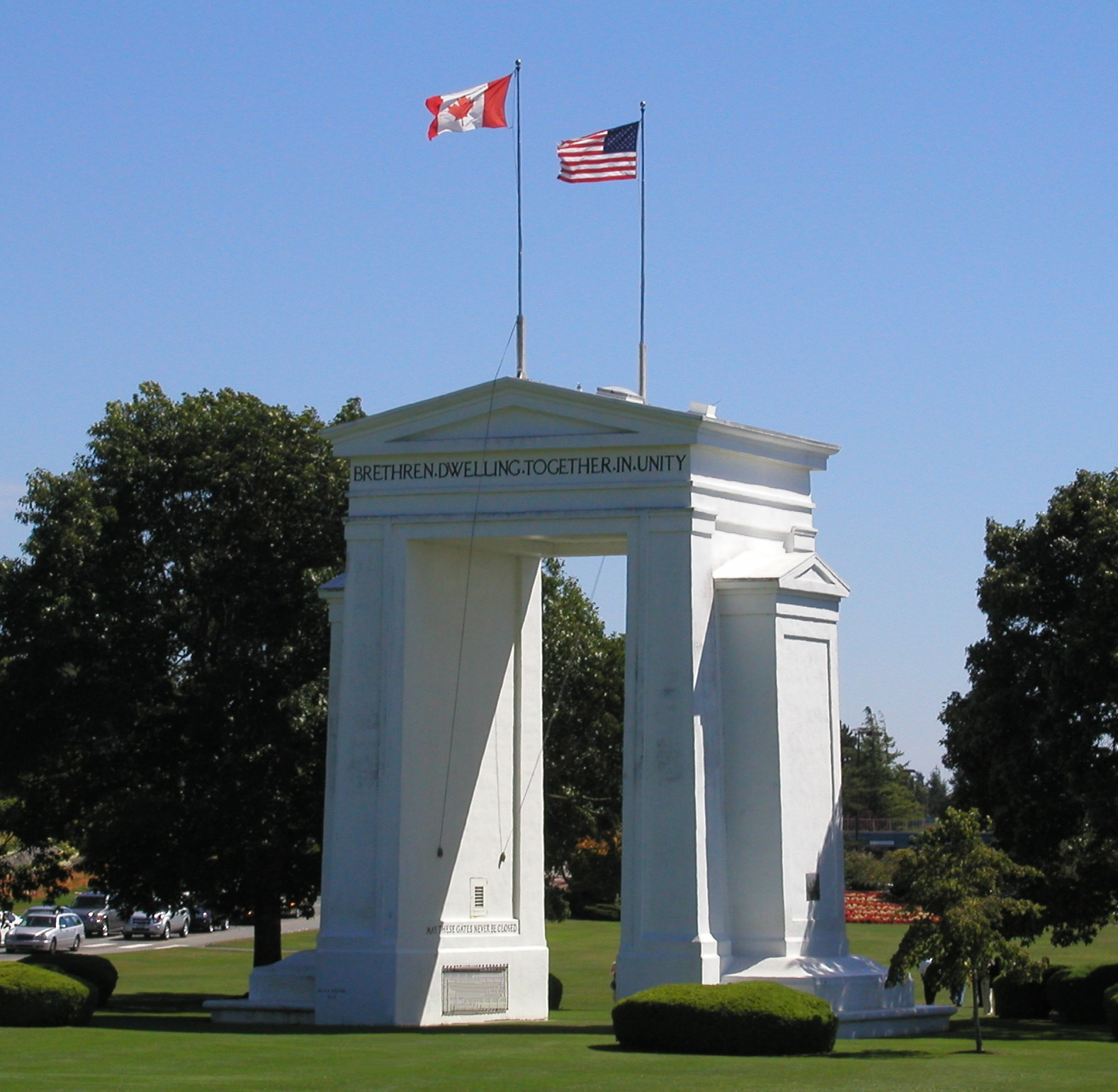
The demilitarized border between Canada and the United States, two members of the North American security community.

According to Deutsch, states may form a security community if the current state of the international system increases "unattractiveness and improbability of war among the political units concerned". For instance, security concerns led the United States and Mexico to form a pluralistic security community in anticipation of World War II. Deutsch identified two conditions that should facilitate formation of a pluralistic security community. The first one is "the capacity of the participating political units or governments to respond to each other's needs, messages, and actions quickly, adequately, and without resort to violence". One way states build this capacity is by common membership in international organizations. The second condition is the "compatibility of major values relevant to political decision-making". An example of a major politically relevant value given by Deutsch is political ideology. However, more recent empirical research showed that the often hypothesized role of liberal values and general trust in the development of security communities is overestimated. Another test, by Michael Haas, compared successful with unsuccessful security-community-oriented organizations, finding that the principal variable with a statistically significant relationship out of Deutsch's 12 variables was mutual compatibility of main values.

Since amalgamation is more demanding than integration, Deutsch identified eight conditions that should be satisfied if amalgamation is to succeed: the mutual compatibility of main values, a distinctive way of life, capabilities and processes of cross-cutting communication, high geographic and social mobility, multiplicity and balance of transactions, a significant frequency of some interchange in group roles, a broadening of the political elite, and high political and administrative capabilities. In addition, the politically relevant strata of the population should be willing to accept and support common governmental institutions, remain loyal to them, and operate these common institutions with mutual attention to the messages and needs of all participating units.

Carol Weaver has posited that, in order to arise and endure, security communities need to be based on balanced multipolarity.

== Other uses ==
The term security community may also refer to a policy community working on issues of security. It can be a hierarchical or networked group of professionals consisting, for instance, of politicians, military and civilian bureaucrats, and researchers. An example is the computer security community working on computer security.
