= Clawhammer =

Banjo playing style

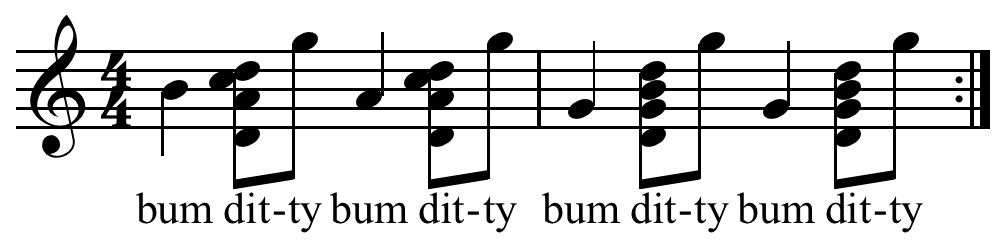
Clawhammer bum-ditty

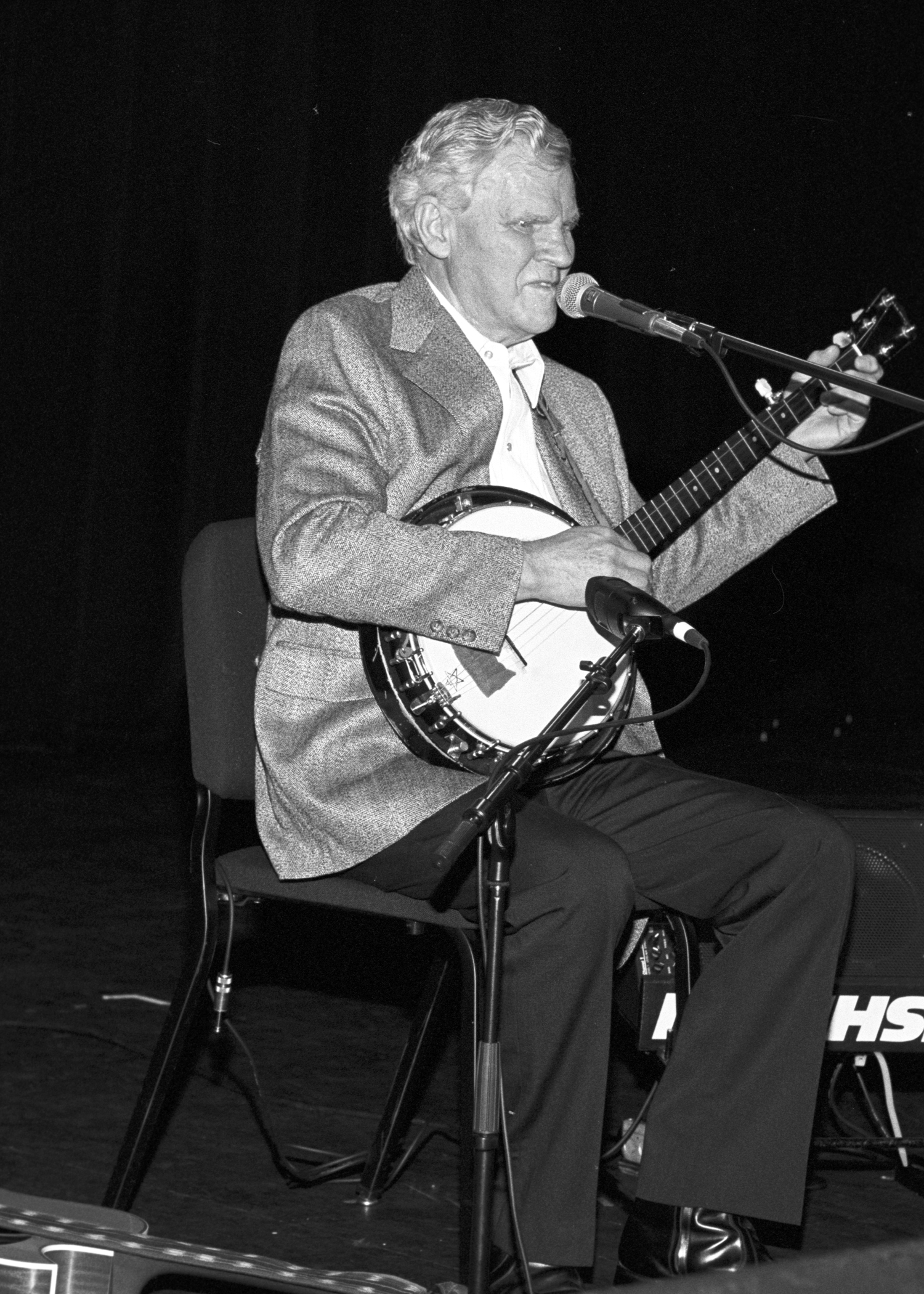
Doc Watson in performance.

Clawhammer, sometimes called down-picking, overhand, or most commonly known as frailing, is a distinctive banjo playing style and a common component of American old-time music.

The principal difference between clawhammer style and other styles is the picking direction. Traditional picking styles (classic banjo), including those for folk, bluegrass, and classical guitar, consist of an up-picking motion by the fingers and a down-picking motion by the thumb; this is also the technique used in the Scruggs style for the banjo. Clawhammer picking, by contrast, is primarily a down-picking style. The hand assumes a claw-like shape and the strumming finger is kept fairly stiff, striking the strings by the motion of the hand at the wrist or elbow, rather than a flicking motion by the finger. In its most common form on the banjo, only the thumb and middle or index finger are used and the finger always downpicks, hitting the string with the back of the fingernail. By contrast, the thumb rests on the fifth string with the downpick motion, and is often released in a lighter up-pick to create the distinctive clawhammer sound.

Although much traditional clawhammer banjo playing is highly rhythmic, it typically includes elements of melody, harmony, rhythm and percussion. The varied playing styles emphasize these elements to different degrees, sometimes changing the emphasis during the performance of a single tune. The possibilities include sounding individual melodic notes, strumming harmonic chords, strumming and picking to produce rhythmic and percussive effects on the strings, as well as making percussive effects by brushing or thumping the thumb or fingers upon the banjo head or skin. This diverse range of musical sounds and effects gives clawhammer banjo its artistic solo potential in addition to its traditional role as a rhythmic accompaniment to other musicians. In particular, the duo of a fiddler playing melody alongside a driving clawhammer accompanist once served as a basic Appalachian dance band, as recalled by Ralph Stanley in his autobiography, Man of Constant Sorrow.

== Technique ==
"Big Eyed Rabbit"
Matokie Slaughter, "Big Eyed Rabbit" from Clawhammer Banjo, Volume Two (County Records) (c. 1960s)

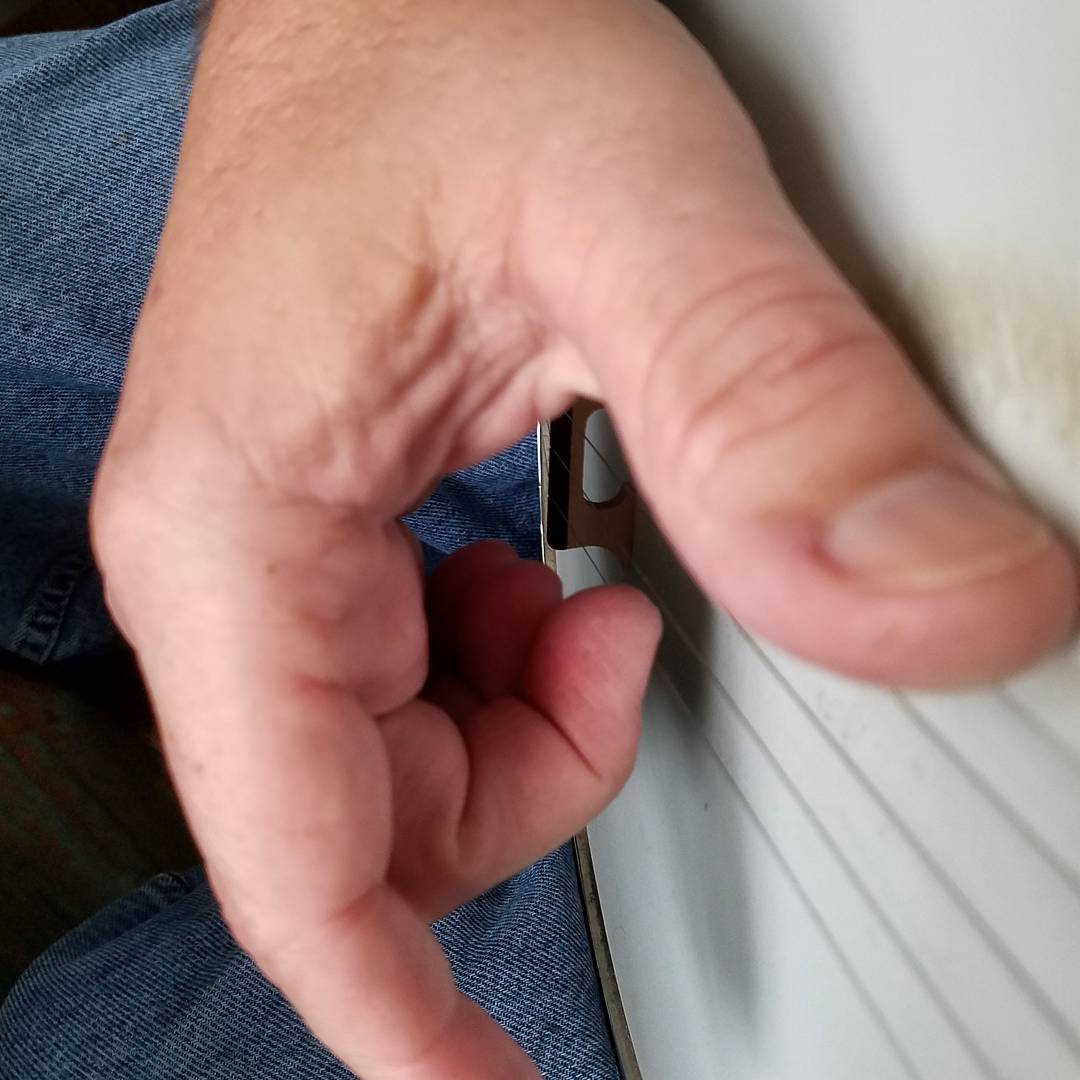
Frailing technique

A common characteristic of clawhammer patterns is the thumb does not pick on the downbeat, as one might in typical fingerpicking patterns for guitar. For example, this is a common, basic 2/4 pattern:

1. A fingerpicked melody quarter note on the downbeat,
2. Other strings strummed with the fingers, for a total of roughly an eighth note starting on the upbeat,
3. A thumbpicked eighth note, usually on the shorter fifth string, to complete the bar.

Here, the thumb plays the high drone on the second "and" of "one and two and". This combined with the middle finger strumming provides a characteristic "bum-ditty bum-ditty" banjo sound, whether actually played on a banjo or on a guitar.

The fretting hand also comes into play in this approach to playing banjo. The fretting hand can hammer, pull off, slide and bend individual and groups of strings. This can create the illusion that the picking hand is doing something more than down-picking.

== Clawhammer vs. frailing ==
While the terms "clawhammer" and "frailing" can be used interchangeably, some old-time players draw a distinction between the two. Some players further distinguish between "drop-thumb" and "clawhammer." The term "double-thumbing" is sometimes used interchangeably with "drop-thumbing," though double thumbing refers specifically to striking the fifth string after every beat rather than every other beat, while drop thumbing refers to dropping the thumb from the 5th drone string down to strike a melody note.

Confusing the nomenclature further are the many older traditional terms which include "overhand," "knockdown", "hoedown," "down-picking," "rapping," "beating," "stroke style," and "clubbing." This is reflective of the informality of old-time music in general, as each player develops an idiomatic style.

== On guitar ==
Although both "clawhammer" and "frailing" are primarily used to refer to banjo styles, the terms do appear with reference to guitar. Jody Stecher was the first guitarist to record in the style, as accompaniment for the song "Red Rocking Chair" on his recording, A Song that Will Linger, with Kate Brislin.

Fingerstyle guitarist Steve Baughman distinguishes between frailing and clawhammer as follows. In frailing, the index fingertip is used for up-picking melody, and the middle fingernail is used for rhythmic downward brushing. In clawhammer, only downstrokes are used, and they are typically played with one fingernail as is the usual technique on the banjo.

Alec Stone Sweet describes the clawhammer technique in the liner notes to "Tumblin' Gap: Clawhammer Guitar Solos": "There are five characteristics of the way I play clawhammer. First, every specific note played by the right hand is produced either by the index finger or the thumb. Second, no note is ever plucked; each is played either with the thumb, or by striking down on a string with the nail of the index finger. Third, the index finger never plays off the beat, and the thumb never plays on the beat. This feature of clawhammer technique gives the music a heavier – and, to my ear, more natural – drive than it would have if it were played, say, as melody over an alternating bass. There is one exception to this rule: variations on a common clawhammer banjo lick (that you can hear on the climactic high notes of the second part of Polly Put the Kettle On, and the third part of Joke on the Puppy) when the thumb plays on beat. Fourth, for any piece, most of the notes are produced by the left hand, in combinations of slides, hammers, and pull-offs; slurs can occur on or off the beat. Fifth, I play in multiple tunings, and sometimes replace the sixth string bass with a high sixth string treble (of the same gauge employed for the first string). The banjo player will realize that I use my thumb on the bass strings to obtain drones, much as a clawhammer player uses the banjo’s high fifth string; indeed, when I string the guitar with a high treble in place of the sixth-string bass, it is partly to imitate the fifth string of the banjo. In many of the tunes, I keep multiple drones going, on different strings. To sum up, in my version of clawhammer guitar, the thumb plays off the beat, even when it plays harmony bass notes or bass lines; no strings are ever plucked; with respect to the right hand, only the index finger and the thumb sound notes, but never at the same time. What is incredible is how much full textured sound one finger, one thumb, and left hand slurs can generate."

Players in this down-picking style include Jody Stecher, Barbecue Bob, Ola Belle Reed, Alec Stone Sweet, Steve Baughman, and Michael Stadler.

Another usage of "clawhammer" in guitar circles refers to a style in which the pinky finger or the pinky and ring fingers are used to brace the hand and the index finger, middle finger, and thumb are used to pluck the strings. The index and middle fingers are held in a claw shape and they do resemble the two prongs of a claw hammer, but this is an uncommon and arguably incorrect usage of the term "clawhammer". See fingerpicking.

== On ukulele ==
The clawhammer banjo technique works quite well on a ukulele in the standard GCEA tuning, especially playing in the key of C or the key of G. Since, like the 5-string banjo, there is a string that is higher pitched on the opposite side, the same technique results in the same sound.

== See also ==
- Carter Family picking
- Walt Koken (born 1946) - claw-hammer banjo player, fiddler, and singer
- Dan Levenson (musician)
