= Robert B. Warren =

American economist and banking expert

- Died: 1950

Academic background
- Education: Harvard University

Academic work
- Discipline: Economist
- Institutions: Institute for Advanced Study

Robert B. Warren was an American economist and banking expert. He was a member of the faculty of the Institute for Advanced Study from 1939 until his death in 1950.

== Education and career ==
Warren got an A.M. at Harvard University in 1916. In 1919 he went to work for the Federal Reserve in Washington.

In 1935 Abraham Flexner was struggling to establish a School of Economics and Politics at the recently founded Institute for Advanced Study in Princeton, New Jersey. The school initially consisted of Edward M. Earle, David Mitrany, and Winfield W. Riefler. In 1939 Warren joined the school on the recommendation of then trustee Walter W. Stewart who had worked with him at the Federal Reserve. But Flexner had established the economics school without the approval of the other faculty and this led to his resignation as Director of the Institute in 1939.

Nevertheless, during World War II members of the IAS School of Economics and Politics did important war work. In 1941, Warren delivered a paper entitled "Function and Scope of War Finance," which was published in 1942 as the lead essay in the Tax Institute's volume, Financing the War, and in 1944 Warren, along with IAS colleague Walter W. Stewart, advised the Treasury Department in Washington on the relation between fiscal operations and the banking system.

Warren was elected to the American Philosophical Society in 1949.
