= Emanuel Adler =

Uruguayan academic

Emanuel Adler, FRSC (Hebrew: עמנואל אדלר; born 1947) is a Uruguayan professor of political science and international relations and the Andrea and Charles Bronfman Chair in Israel Studies at the University of Toronto. He was also the editor of International Organization and has an honorary professor in the Department of Political Science at the University of Copenhagen.

Adler moved to Israel in 1970, where he studied at the Hebrew University of Jerusalem, where he got a BA in History and International Relations (IR) and an MA in International Relations. In 1976 he moved to the United States, and became doctor in Political Science at University of California at Berkeley in 1982.

Adler is associated with constructivism in international relations theory, and has made contributions to IR theory through his work on epistemic communities, security communities, and "practice theory." One of his most cited articles, "Seizing the middle ground: Constructivism in world politics" argues that constructivism occupies the middle ground between rationalist approaches (such as realism and liberalism) and interpretive approaches (such as postmodernist, poststructuralist and critical approaches).

In 2013, he was made a Fellow of the Royal Society of Canada. In 2017, he opened the Latin American Political Science Congress.
