= Epistemic community =

Network of professionals with knowledge and skill in a particular area

An epistemic community is a network of professionals with recognized knowledge and skill in a particular issue-area. They share a set of beliefs, which provide a value-based foundation for the actions of members. Members of an epistemic community also share causal beliefs, which result from their analysis of practices that contribute to set of problems in their issue-area that then allow them to see the multiple links between policy and outcomes. Third, they share notions of validity, or internationally defined criteria for validating knowledge in their area of know-how. However, the members are from all different professions. Epistemic communities also have a common set of practices associated with a set of problems towards which their professional knowledge is directed, because of the belief that human welfare will benefit as a result. Communities evolve independently and without influence of authority or government. They do not have to be large; some are made up of only a few members. Even non-members can have an influence on epistemic communities. However, if the community loses consensus, then its authority decreases.

== Definition ==
The definitive conceptual framework of an epistemic community is widely accepted as that of Peter M. Haas. He describes them as

"...a network of professionals with recognised expertise and competence in a particular domain and an authoritative claim to policy relevant knowledge within that domain or issue-area."

As discussed Haas's definitive text, an epistemic community is made up of a diverse range of academic and professional experts, who are allied on the basis of four unifying characteristics:

1. a shared set of normative and principled beliefs which provide a value-based rationale for the social action of community members;
2. shared causal beliefs which are derived from their analysis of practices leading or contributing to a central set of problems in their domain and which then serve as the basis for elucidating the multiple linkages between possible policy actions and desired outcomes;
3. shared notions of validity, i.e. intersubjective, internally defined criteria for weighing and validating knowledge in the domain of their expertise; and
4. a common policy enterprise, or a set of common practices associated with a set of problems to which their professional competence is directed, presumably out of the conviction that human welfare will be enhanced as a consequence.

Thus, when viewed as an epistemic community, the overall enterprise of the expert members emerges as the product of a combination of shared beliefs and more subtle conformity pressures, rather than a direct drive for concurrence (Michael J. Mazarr). Epistemic communities also have a "normative component" meaning the end goal is always for the betterment of society, rather than self gain of the community itself (Peter M. Haas).

Most researchers carefully distinguish between epistemic forms of community and "real" or "bodily" community which consists of people sharing risk, especially bodily risk. It is also problematic to draw the line between modern ideas and more ancient ones, for example, Joseph Campbell's concept of myth from cultural anthropology, and Carl Jung's concept of archetype in psychology. Some consider forming an epistemic community a deep human need, and ultimately a mythical or even religious obligation. Among these very notably are E. O. Wilson, as well as Ellen Dissanayake, an American historian of aesthetics who famously argued that almost all of our broadly shared conceptual metaphors centre on one basic idea of safety: that of "home".

From this view, an epistemic community may be seen as a group of people who do not have any specific history together, but search for a common idea of home as if forming an intentional community. For example, an epistemic community can be found in a network of professionals from a wide variety of disciplines and backgrounds.

Although the members of an epistemic community may originate from a variety of academic or professional backgrounds, they are linked by a set of unifying characteristics for the promotion of collective amelioration and not collective gain. This is termed their "normative component". In the big picture, epistemic communities are socio-psychological entities that create and justify knowledge. Such communities can constitute of only two persons and yet gain an important role in building knowledge on any specific subject. Miika Vähämaa has recently suggested that epistemic communities consist of persons being able to understand, discuss and gain self-esteem concerning the matters being discussed.

Some theorists argue that an epistemic community may consist of those who accept one version of a story, or one version of validating a story. Michel Foucault referred more elaborately to mathesis as a rigorous episteme suitable for enabling cohesion of a discourse and thus uniting a community of its followers. In philosophy of science and systems science the process of forming a self-maintaining epistemic community is sometimes called a mindset. In politics, a tendency or faction is usually described in very similar terms.

== Emergence ==
Epistemic communities came to be because of the rapid professionalization of government agencies. The Columbia Basin Inter-Agency Committee was created by U.S. President Franklin D. Roosevelt to coordinate the planning process. However, it did not actually participate in the planning process, but rather was the venue that the Army Corps of Engineers and the Bureau of Reclamation used to divide construction projects. The failure of the Columbia Basin Inter-Agency Committee to be part of the planning process shows that "committees imposed from the top may be less likely to promote coordination than to provide agency officials with a means to enhance their autonomy" (Thomas 1997, 225). Another reason why epistemic communities came to be is that decision makers began turning to experts to help them understand issues because there were more issues and all were more complicated. This caused greater interest in planning, and future-oriented research, which caused the establishment of environmental and natural resource agencies in 118 countries from 1972 to 1982. Growing professionalization of bureaucracies caused more respect towards experts, especially scientists. The first achievement by epistemic communities was the Anti-Ballistic Missile Treaty between the United States and Russia.

== Role in international relations ==
Epistemic communities influence policy by providing knowledge to policy makers. Uncertainty plays a large role in an epistemic community's influence, because they hold the knowledge that policy makers need to create the wanted outcomes in policy. According to Robert Keohane they fill the absence of “a research program” [that shows] in particular studies that it can illuminate important issues in world politics,” (Adler/Haas 1992, 367). They can influence the setting of standards and the development of regulations as well as help coordinate structure of IR. The communities influence through communicative action; diffusing ideas nationally, transnationally, and internationally. An epistemic community's scope of cooperation is directly linked to the comprehensiveness of their beliefs. The strength of cooperative agreements depends on the power that the epistemic community has gathered within agencies and governments. The duration of cooperation is determined by the epistemic community's continued power. The most important contributions of epistemic communities are; that they direct attention towards the conditions which will likely cause a coalition to form and the possibilities of expansion, they insists on the importance of awareness and knowledge in negotiation, and they deepen the knowledge of how various actors define their interests.

== Role in international policy coordination ==
Epistemic communities usually aid in issues concerning a technical nature. Normally, they guide decision makers towards the appropriate norms and institutions by framing and institutionalizing the issue-area. Epistemic communities are also a source of policy innovation. Communities have indirect and direct roles in policy coordination by diffusing ideas and influencing the positions adopted. Policy evolution occurs in four steps: policy innovation, diffusion, selection, and persistence. Through framing the range of political controversy surrounding an issue, defining state interests, and setting standards epistemic communities can define the best solution to a problem. The definition of interest is specially important because there are many different definitions of what is a priority for a government. Intellectual innovations (produced by epistemic communities) are carried by domestic or international organizations (epistemic communities are a part of these organizations) then are selected by political process. Peter M. Haas argued “that epistemic communities help to explain the emergence and character of cooperation at the international level,” (Thomas 1997, 223). The shared interests they represent last more than the disagreements about a specific issue. Epistemic communities create a reality that is hindered by political factors and related considerations. If an epistemic community only acquires power in one country or international body, then its power is a direct effect of that country or body's power.

== Impact ==
Epistemic communities became institutionalized in the short term because of change into the policy-making process and to persuade others that their approach is the right approach. Long-term effects occur through socialization. There are a myriad of examples of the impact that epistemic communities have had on public policy. Arms control ideas are reflected in the ABM Treaty and agreements following it during Cold War. Epistemic communities brought attention to chlorofluorocarbons and their polluting consequences. This realization led to the creation of environmental international agencies in a majority of the world's governments. This caused environmental decisions to go through the United Nations Environment Programme rather than through General Agreement on Tariffs and Trade (GATT) who would normally dispute these issues. Such was the case when the 1989 Basel Convention on the Control of Trans-boundary Movements of Hazardous Wastes and Their Disposal.

An epistemic community helped identify issues and direct the parameters that provided outline for GATT and some free trade agreements. They have also helped in telecommunications agreements and economy issues around the world. In telecommunications, “without the influence of an epistemic community of engineers concerned about design and international coordination of telecommunications equipment and standards, the regime would not have moved in the direction of multilateral agreements,” (Adler/Haas 1992, 377).

Epistemic communities were directly involved in the creation of the Board of Plant Genetic Resources. As well as the creation of food aid and the way that food aid functions. Epistemic communities also have brought attention to the habitat fragmentation and decline of biodiversity on the planet. This has led to reform throughout the world creating conservation agencies and policies. In California, an ecological epistemic community succeeded in creating the Memorandum of Understanding Biological Diversity (MOU on Biodiversity). The agreement covered all habitats and species in California for protection. The MOU on Biodiversity was followed by the Endangered Species Act which applied to all of the United States. Epistemic communities have a direct effect on agenda setting in intergovernmental organizations and indirect effect on the behavior of small countries. The ideas and policies of an epistemic community can become orthodoxy through the work of that community and through socialization. However, their effect is limited because there is a need for a shock to cause policy makers to seek epistemic community.

== Role in environmental governance ==
The global environmental agenda is increasing in complexity and interconnectedness. Often environmental policymakers do not understand the technical aspects of the issues they are regulating. This affects their ability to define state interests and develop suitable solutions within cross-boundary environmental regulation.

As a result, conditions of uncertainty are produced which stimulate a demand for new information. Environmental crises play a significant role in exacerbating conditions of uncertainty for decision-makers. Political elites seek expert knowledge and advice to reduce this technical uncertainty, on issues including:

- the scale of environmental problems,
- cause-and-effect interrelations of ecological processes, and
- how (science-based) policy options will play out.

Therefore, epistemic communities can frame environmental problems as they see fit, and environmental decision-makers begin to make policy-shaping decisions based on these specific depictions.

The initial identification and bounding of environmental issues by epistemic community members is very influential. They can limit what would be preferable in terms of national interests, frame what issues are available for collective debate, and delimit the policy alternatives deemed possible. The political effects are not easily reversible. The epistemic community vision is institutionalised as a collective set of understandings reflected in any subsequent policy choices.

This represents an indirect form of influence. Policy actors may adopt ideas developed within an epistemic community when those ideas are regarded as credible and supported by shared knowledge. Members of successful epistemic communities may subsequently gain influence at the national or international level when decision-makers draw on their expertise and recommendations.

As a result, epistemic communities have a direct input on how international cooperation may develop in the long term. Transboundary environmental problems require a unified response rather than patchwork policy efforts, but this is problematic due to enduring differences of state interest and concerns over reciprocity. The transnational nature of epistemic communities means numerous states may absorb new patterns of logic and behaviour, leading to the adoption of concordant state policies. Therefore, the likelihood of convergent state behaviour and associated international coordination is increased.

International cooperation is further facilitated if powerful states are involved, as a quasi-structure is created containing the reasons, expectations and arguments for coordination. Also, if epistemic community members have developed authoritative bureaucratic reputations in various countries, they are likely to participate in the creation and running of national and international institutions that directly pursue international policy coordination, for example, a regulatory agency, think tank or governmental research body. Actively building such authoritative bureaucratic reputations has also been argued as an active strategy for regulatory agencies, think tanks, and research bodies, to gain more legitimacy among (epistemic) community members for their professional activities, such as policy coordination. This strategic role of authoritative bureaucratic reputations is a core premise of Bureaucratic Reputation Theory.

As a result, epistemic community members in a number of different countries can become connected through intergovernmental channels, as well as existing community channels, producing a transnational governance network, and facilitating the promotion of international policy coordination. An example of a scientific epistemic community in action is the 1975 collectively negotiated Mediterranean Action Plan (MAP), a marine pollution control regime for the Mediterranean Sea developed by the United Nations Environment Programme.

== Limitations ==
Some refutations have been formulated about epistemic communities, in the study of the circulation of international expertise. Firstly, one should be cautious about the risk of retrospective thinking when conceptualizing epistemic communities. Indeed, the solutions proposed by expert groups which are eventually adopted by policy makers are one but many that have been formulated by the scientific community. The epistemic community proposition is confirmed by the fact that the solution adopted are necessarily "tolerable" by policy makers, who choose between all those which have been proposed by the scientific community. Secondly, it is difficult to assess the limits of the term "experts". For instance, the G7 "experts" would in fact be civil servants from the member-states of the organization, who therefore cannot claim the scientific legitimacy of researchers. Finally, this hypothesis does not take into consideration the influence of national contexts in the agenda-setting of epistemic communities. The experts are restricted to the limit of the tolerable in their own national context, which is also crucial in the adoption of the solutions they propose at the local level.

== See also ==
- Epistemic community (international relations)
- Global governance
- Governmentality
- Internationalism
- International community
- Knowledge falsification
- Network governance
- Social network
- Transnationalism
- Statism
