= Knowledge spillover =

Phenomenon of knowledge spilling over to other people

Knowledge spillover is an exchange of ideas among individuals. Knowledge spillover is usually replaced by terminations of technology spillover, R&D spillover and/or spillover (economics) when the concept is specific to technology management and innovation economics. In knowledge management economics, knowledge spillovers are non-rival knowledge market costs incurred by a party not agreeing to assume the costs that has a spillover effect of stimulating technological improvements in a neighbor through one's own innovation. Such innovations often come from specialization within an industry.

There are two kinds of knowledge spillovers: internal and external. Internal knowledge spillover occurs if there is a positive impact of knowledge between individuals within an organization that produces goods and/or services. An external knowledge spillover occurs when the positive impact of knowledge is between individuals outside of a production organization. Marshall–Arrow–Romer (MAR) spillovers, Porter spillovers and Jacobs spillovers are three types of spillovers.

== Conceptualizations ==
=== Marshall–Arrow–Romer ===
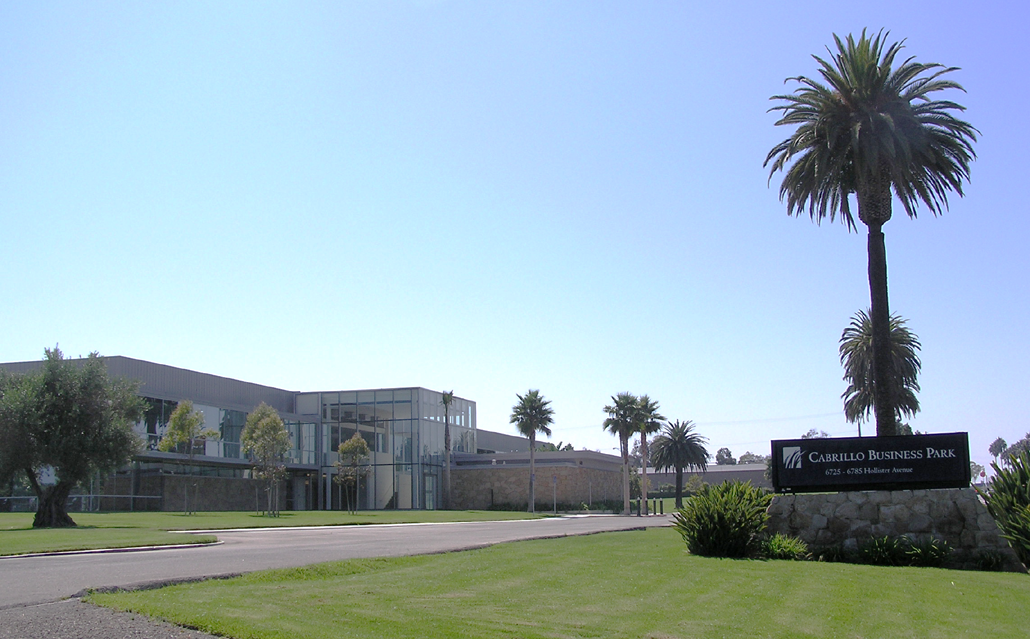
A business park in Santa Barbara County, California that may generate MAR spillover

Marshall–Arrow–Romer (MAR) spillover has its origins in 1890, where the English economist Alfred Marshall developed a theory of knowledge spillovers. Knowledge spillovers later were extended by economists Kenneth Arrow (1962) and Paul Romer (1986). In 1992, Edward Glaeser, Hedi Kallal, José Scheinkman, and Andrei Shleifer pulled together the Marshall–Arrow–Romer views on knowledge spillovers and accordingly named the view MAR spillover in 1992.

Under the Marshall–Arrow–Romer (MAR) spillover view, the proximity of firms within a common industry often affects how well knowledge travels among firms to facilitate innovation and growth. The closer the firms are to one another, the greater the MAR spillover. The exchange of ideas is largely from employee to employee, in that employees from different firms in an industry exchange ideas about new products and new ways to produce goods. The opportunity to exchange ideas that lead to innovations key to new products and improved production methods.

Research on the Cambridge IT Cluster (UK) suggests that technological knowledge spillovers might only happen rarely and are less important than other cluster benefits such as labour market pooling.

=== Porter ===
Porter (1990), like MAR, argues that knowledge spillovers in specialized, geographically concentrated industries stimulate growth. He insists, however, that local competition, as opposed to local monopoly, fosters the pursuit and rapid adoption of innovation. He gives examples of Italian ceramics and gold jewellery industries, in which hundreds of firms are located together and fiercely compete to innovate since the alternative to innovation is demise. Porter's externalities are maximized in cities with geographically specialized, competitive industries.

=== Jacobs ===
Under the Jacobs spillover view, the proximity of firms from different industries affect how well knowledge travels among firms to facilitate innovation and growth. This is in contrast to MAR spillovers, which focus on firms in a common industry. The diverse proximity of a Jacobs spillover brings together ideas among individuals with different perspectives to encourage an exchange of ideas and foster innovation in an industrially diverse environment.

Developed in 1969 by urbanist Jane Jacobs and John Jackson the concept that Detroit’s shipbuilding industry from the 1830s was the critical antecedent leading to the 1890s development of the auto industry in Detroit since the gasoline engine firms easily transitioned from building gasoline engines for ships to building them for automobiles.

== Incoming and outgoing spillovers ==
Knowledge spillover has asymmetric directions. The focal entity and receives or outflows know-how to others, creating incoming and outgoing spillovers. Cassiman and Veugelers (2002) use survey data and estimate incoming and outgoing spillover and study the economic impacts. Incoming spillover increases growth opportunity and productivity improvements of receivers, while outgoing spillover leads to free rider problem in the technology competition. Chen et al. (2013) use econometric method to gauge incoming spillover, a way that applies for all companies without survey. They find that incoming spillover explains R&D profits of industrial firms.

== Policy implications ==
As information is largely non-rival in nature, certain measures must be taken to ensure that, for the originator, the information remains a private asset. As the market cannot do this efficiently, public regulations have been implemented to facilitate a more appropriate equilibrium.

As a result, the concept of intellectual property rights have developed and ensure the ability of entrepreneurs to temporarily hold on to the profitability of their ideas through patents, copyrights, trade secrets, and other governmental safeguards. Conversely, such barriers to entry prevent the exploitation of informational developments by rival firms within an industry. For example, Wang (2023) indicates that technology spillovers are reduced by 27% to 51% when trade secrets laws are implemented by the Uniform Trade Secrets Act in the US.

On the other hand, when the research and development of a private firm results in a social benefit, unaccounted for within the market price, often greater than the private return of the firm's research, then a subsidy to offset the underproduction of that benefit might be offered to the firm in return for its continued output of that benefit. Government subsidies are often controversial, and while they might often result in a more appropriate social equilibrium, they could also lead to undesirable political repercussions as such a subsidy must come from taxpayers, some of whom may not directly benefit from the researching firm's subsidized knowledge spillover. The concept of knowledge spillover is also used to justify subsidies to foreign direct investment, as foreign investors help diffuse technology among local firms.

== Examples ==
Business parks are an example of concentrated businesses that may benefit from MAR spillover. Many semiconductor firms intentionally located their research and development facilities in Silicon Valley to take advantage of MAR spillover. In addition, the film industry in Los Angeles, California, and elsewhere relies on a geographic concentration of specialists, such as directors, producers, scriptwriters, and set designers, to bring together narrow aspects of movie-making into a final product.

A general example of a knowledge spillover could be the collective growth associated with the research and development of online social networking tools like Facebook, YouTube, and Twitter. Such tools have not only created a positive feedback loop, and a host of originally unintended benefits for their users, but have also created an explosion of new software, programming platforms, and conceptual breakthroughs that have perpetuated the development of the industry as a whole. The advent of online marketplaces, the utilization of user profiles, the widespread democratization of information, and the interconnectivity between tools within the industry have all been products of each tool's individual developments. These developments have since spread outside the industry into the mainstream media as news and entertainment firms have developed their own market feedback applications within the tools themselves, and their own versions of online networking tools (e.g. CNN’s iReport).
