= Neil Fligstein =

American sociologist (born 1953)

- Born: May 23, 1951 (age 75); Seattle, Washington, U.S.
- Citizenship: American
- Known for: A Theory of Fields Markets as Politics Political-cultural approach to markets Theory of social fields
- Awards: Class of 1939 Chancellor’s Professor, UC Berkeley (1997) Fellow, Center for Advanced Study in the Behavioral Sciences (1994–95) Guggenheim Fellow (2004–05) Rockefeller Foundation Bellagio Center Fellow (2007) Member, American Academy of Arts and Sciences (2010)

Academic work
- Notable works: The Architecture of Markets Euroclash A Theory of Fields (with Doug McAdam)

Neil Fligstein (born May 23, 1951) is an American sociologist, and professor at the University of California, Berkeley. His research focuses on economic sociology, political sociology, and organizational theory. It has advanced the understanding of how social fields shape economic and political orders, including influential frameworks on the cultural foundations of markets and strategic action fields.

Fligstein has developed a “political-cultural” approach to market analysis, arguing that markets are social and political arenas shaped by actors’ conceptions of control, state regulation, and institutional structures." These concepts have been applied to study the European Union's development of a single market through cooperative political processes. In 2012, he co-authored A Theory of Fields with Doug McAdam, presenting a framework for analyzing social orders in politics, economics, and social movements.

== Early life and education ==
Born in Seattle, Washington, Fligstein received his BA in 1973 from Reed College, an MS in 1976 from the University of Wisconsin, and a PhD in 1979 from the University of Wisconsin.

In 1984, Fligstein was promoted to associate professor at the University of Arizona, and to full professor in 1990. In 1991, he joined the University of California, Berkeley as a professor of sociology, serving as department chair from 1992 to 1995. He is the director of the Center for Culture, Organization, and Politics at Berkeley's Institute for Research on Labor and Employment. In 2001, Fligstein published The Architecture of Markets,, a work that reconceptualizes markets as social structures shaped by political processes and corporate strategies.

== Academic work ==
Fligstein's work examines the formation, stabilization, and transformation of social institutions. He proposes that social action occurs within "meso-level social orders" or "fields," where individuals and groups compete for shared objectives. In A Theory of Fields, Fligstein and McAdam suggest that early-stage social orders resemble social movements, characterized by fluid definitions of goals, participants, and governing norms.

Fligstein emphasizes "social skill"—defined as the ability to foster cooperation through empathy—as important for establishing and maintaining social fields. He argues that skilled actors facilitate social order by creating collective identities.

=== Theory of markets ===
According to Fligstein's market theory, markets emerge as meso-level orders where established players and challengers compete for dominance. Fligstein suggests that incumbents often shape market logic through "conceptions of control." He also highlights the state's role in stabilizing markets through regulation and intervention. He proposes a socio-economic framework of understanding "markets as politics".

=== History of the large American corporation ===
Fligstein's study of U.S. corporations from 1870 to 1980 traces the evolution of corporate strategies in response to competition, and how this redefined ownership and management dynamics.

=== Construction of a European legal and political system ===
Fligstein's analysis of the European Single Market project focuses on its role in facilitating cross-border trade for businesses. In Euroclash, Fligstein analyzes European integration as a political and social process, investigating how legal frameworks, market structures, and collective identities interact across the EU.

In Euroclash, Fligstein explores how EU integration has influenced industries, identities, and politics. He notes that approximately 13% of Europeans primarily identify as European, often educated professionals with liberal views, while about half do so occasionally. He posits that integration progresses with majority national support but remains subordinate to national political concerns.

== Selected publications ==
=== Books ===
Fligstein, Neil and Doug McAdam. A Theory of Fields. Oxford University Press, 2012.

Fligstein, Neil. Euroclash: The EU, European Identity, and the Future of Europe. Oxford University Press, 2008.

Fligstein, Neil. The Transformation of Corporate Control. Harvard University Press, 1990.

Fligstein, Neil. The Architecture of Markets: An Economic Sociology of Twenty-First-Century Capitalist Societies. Princeton University Press, 2001.

Sweet, Alec Stone, Wayne Sandholtz, and Neil Fligstein, eds. The Institutionalization of Europe. Oxford University Press, 2001.

=== Articles ===
Fligstein, Neil (1985). "The spread of the multidivisional form among large firms, 1919-1979". American Sociological Review. 1985 (3): 377–391. doi:10.2307/2095547. JSTOR 2095547.

Fligstein, Neil (1996). "Markets as politics: A political-cultural approach to market institutions" (PDF). American Sociological Review. 1996 (4): 656–673. CiteSeerX 10.1.1.695.455. doi:10.2307/2096398. JSTOR 2096398. Archived from the original (PDF) on 2014-04-11.

Fligstein, Neil (1997). "Social skill and institutional theory". American Behavioral Scientist. 40 (4): 397–405. doi:10.1177/0002764297040004003. S2CID 144547075.

Fligstein, Neil (2001). "Social skill and the theory of fields" (PDF). Sociological Theory. 19 (2): 105–125. doi:10.1111/0735-2751.00132. S2CID 15605148.
