= Winfield W. Riefler =

American economist (1897–1974)

- Born: 1897
- Died: 1974 (aged 76–77)

Academic work
- Institutions: Institute for Advanced Study

Winfield W. Riefler (1897–1974) was an American economist and statistician who helped create the Federal Housing Administration and was instrumental in the 1951 Treasury-Fed Accord

Riefler is credited with inventing the modern amortized home mortgage. This new mortgage type was designed to be more stable than the balloon mortgages common during the 1920s, which had led to the National Mortgage Crisis of the 1930s.

His Riefler-Burgess framework stood in opposition to the real bills doctrine as a guiding philosophy of U.S. monetary policy in the early 1930s.

During World War II he was an active participant in the activities of the League of Nations and served as a minister for economic warfare in London.

In 1935 he was elected as a Fellow of the American Statistical Association. He served as president of the American Statistical Association in 1942 and was a faculty member of the Institute for Advanced Study from 1935 to 1949. Riefler served as assistant to the chairman of the Board of Governors of the Federal Reserve System from 1948 to 1959.

In a 1947 article in Foreign Affairs, "Our Economic Contribution to War", Riefler described the intersection between civilian and military components of an industrial economy. Thus, using the phrase "military-industrial complex" before it was used by (and ascribed to) President Eisenhower in 1961.
