= Walter W. Stewart =

American economist (1885 - 1985)

- Born: 1885; Manhattan, Kansas
- Died: March 6, 1958 (aged 72–73)

Academic background
- Education: University of Missouri

Academic work
- Discipline: Economics
- Institutions: Institute for Advanced Study

Walter W. Stewart (1885 — 1958) was an American economist and banking expert. He was an economics advisor to four presidents, Coolidge, Hoover, Roosevelt and Eisenhower.

== Education and career ==
Stewart graduated Phi Beta Kappa from the University of Missouri in 1909. He was a professor of economics at the University of Missouri, the University of Michigan and Amherst College. He joined the faculty of the School of Economics and Politics at the Institute for Advanced Study (IAS) on September 1, 1938, and remained there until his death in 1958.

During World War I, Stewart was a staff member in the planning and statistics division of the War Industries Board. In 1922, he joined the Federal Reserve Board as Director of Research where he served as a mentor to Emanuel Goldenweiser and built a bridge between the statistics division and central bank policy.

He was an economic advisor to the Bank of England from 1928 to 1930, the first American to serve in that capacity.

During World War II members of the IAS School of Economics and Politics did important war work. In 1944 Stewart along with IAS colleague Robert B. Warren worked for the Treasury Department in Washington, advising them on the relation between fiscal operations and the banking system. He served on President Dwight D. Eisenhower's Council of Economic Advisers from 1953 to 1955.

In 1927 he was elected as a Fellow of the American Statistical Association. He was elected to the American Philosophical Society in 1943.

Non-profit organization positions
Preceded by John D. Rockefeller Jr.	Chairman of the Rockefeller Foundation; 1940 – 1950	Succeeded by John Foster Dulles
