= Spillover (economics) =

Economic effect

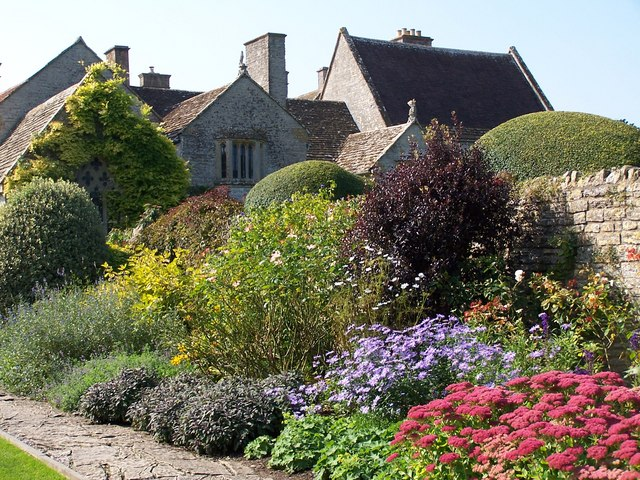
The neighbors who live beside this house and garden get a positive externality, as they get to enjoy the view and scent of the flowers at no cost.

In economics, a spillover is a positive or a negative, but more often negative, impact experienced in one region or across the world due to an independent event occurring from an unrelated environment.

For example, externalities of economic activity are non-monetary spillover effects upon non-participants. Odors from a rendering plant are negative spillover effects upon its neighbors; the beauty and pleasing scent of a homeowner's flower garden is a positive spillover effect upon neighbors. The concept of spillover in economics could be replaced by terminations of technology spillover, R&D spillover and/or knowledge spillover when the concept is specific to technology management and innovation economics. Moreover, positive or negative impact often creates a social crisis or a shock in the market like booms or crashes.

In the same way, the economic benefits of increased trade are the spillover effects anticipated in the formation of multilateral alliances of many of the regional nation states: e.g. SAARC (South Asian Association for Regional Cooperation), ASEAN (Association of South East Asian Nations).

In an economy in which some markets fail to clear, such failure can influence the demand or supply behavior of affected participants in other markets, causing their effective demand or effective supply to differ from their notional (unconstrained) demand or supply.

Another kind of spillover is generated by information. For example, when more information about someone generates more information about people related to her, and that information helps to eliminate asymmetries in information, then the spillover effects are positive (this issue has been found constantly in the economics and finance literature, see for instance the case of local banking markets).

== History of the concept ==
19th century economists John Stuart Mill and Henry Sidgwick are credited with founding the early concepts related to spillover effects. These ideas extend upon Adam Smith's famous ‘Invisible Hand’ theory which is a price that suggests prices can be naturally determined by the forces of supply and demand to form a market price and market quantity where buyers and sellers are willing to make a transaction. Spillover effects, also known as externalities in market theory are the costs associated with a transaction borne upon a party/parties that are non participants in the transaction (i.e., Production costs do not consider the cost of pollution on society at large). Furthermore, Mill argues that Government intervention in the market can be a useful tool when necessary to prevent or mitigate spillover effects when necessary as opposed to Adam Smith who believed a competitive market with little to no intervention provides the most adequate outcome.

These ideas on spillover effects later became extended upon further by other economists, notably Arthur Pigou. Pigou developed the concept of externalities in 1920 through ‘The Economics of Welfare’. Essentially, Pigou argued negative externalities (spillover) of an activity should incur an extra cost or tax while activities that produce a positive externalities (spillover) should be subsidized to further encourage this activity. Taxes on these activities that create negative externalities are commonly used in the 21st century through taxes including excise tax on purchasing alcohol and cigarettes which can cause damages to the health and wellbeing of citizens.

== Types of spillover effects ==
There are different types of spillover effects which can take place. According to the Corporate Finance Institute, spillover effects can be categorised in the following ways: 1. Social Interaction Spillover Effect 2. Context Equilibrium Effect 3.General Equilibrium Effect 4. Externalities Spillover Effect

=== Social interaction spillover effect ===
Social interaction spillover effect occurs when community programs and initiatives have the effect of benefiting the welfare of people and in turn the community at large. For example, free education, social welfare payments and other public goods are designed to improve the social behaviour, education and employability of citizens which in turn could lower crime rates and poverty in the community in theory.

Context equilibrium effect

Context equilibrium effect emerges from interventions that influence social norms or behaviors within a specific context, such as a local area where the interactions take place.

=== General equilibrium effects ===
General equilibrium effects can happen when there is an impact in the market either positively or negatively creating a spillover effect through interdependence of firms and households in the economy. This occurs as entities do not operate in a bubble, hence when there is a financial shock or boon to a business or industry, this impacts factors including pricing, costs and wages for other entities. Rather, entities experience shocks or boons in relation to other entities. For example, if there were to be a global shortage of oil production, global supply and demand would interact to put upward pressure on oil and in turn fuel prices. This occurs as consumers are effectively bidding for the remaining oil which is more scarce than before, forming a new equilibrium price in the market. Hence fuel stations and consumers are impacted by the spillover effect of oil shortages.

=== Externalities spillover effect ===
External spillover effects are similar to general equilibrium effects in that they impact third parties which are not directly participating in the transaction. However, the key difference is that externalities are represented by social costs that are not reflected in a price change without government intervention. An example of an externality may be pollution resulting from production of goods and services. This cost does not appear in the cost of production, rather it exists outside of the market supply and demand schedule.

Positive and Negative Spillover Effects

Positive Spillover

Positive spillover occurs when changes in one behavior influence favorably changes in subsequent behaviors. An example can be free public education offered by the government. Students become smarter, gain knowledge and experience. This leads to more educated population, which can move out to the other countries.

Negative Spillover

Negative spillover is the opposite of positive spillover, meaning unwanted social, political, and economic impacts. An example is pollution caused by industrial plants, releasing smoke, carbon dioxide gas, oil wastewater, and other harmful waste materials into the atmosphere. As we know, pollution leads to global warming, which affects all of us. Global warming causes the melting of ice, which leads to raising sea levels. Another example could be demand for commodities (such as palm oil or osy) in one country that cause deforestation in other countries. Negative spillovers impact both the participants and non-participants.

== Graphical representation ==
Externalities in the supply and demand curve: Note the graph representing a negative externality below. To illustrate this concept the ‘marginal social cost’ (MSC) is used in comparison to the ‘marginal private cost’ (MPC). Marginal social cost is the line which includes all externalities including the social cost of pollution in addition to regular production costs. Alternatively, marginal private cost also considers the regular production costs used in a transaction.

Thus, in the diagram below, if the market was functioning properly by accounting for negative externalities, society would produce at quantity 2 (Q2) and a higher price (P2). Without considering negative externalities, society would produce at Quantity 1 (Q1) and at a lower price (P1). Hence, due to negative externalities (social costs) being excluded from transactions, society overproduces products with negative externalities and underprices them.

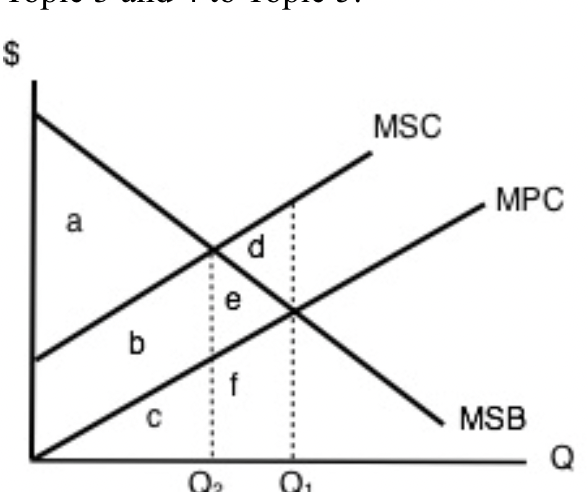
Negative Externalities in supply and demand schedule

For positive externalities, see the diagram below. Note there are no social costs (negative externalities) that have been excluded from the private cost as there is a single cost line. In this case, social benefit (MSB) exceeds private benefit (MPB). In effect, this means the private benefit of a transaction (i.e., profit for a newly established business) is only part of the benefit accrued as an additional social cost (i.e., Surrounding cafes and restaurants gain more customers as employees from the newly established business buy lunch). Hence if the market was functioning properly to include social benefits, the market would produce at quantity 2 (Q2) and at price 2 (P2) which represents the true equilibrium quantity and prices.

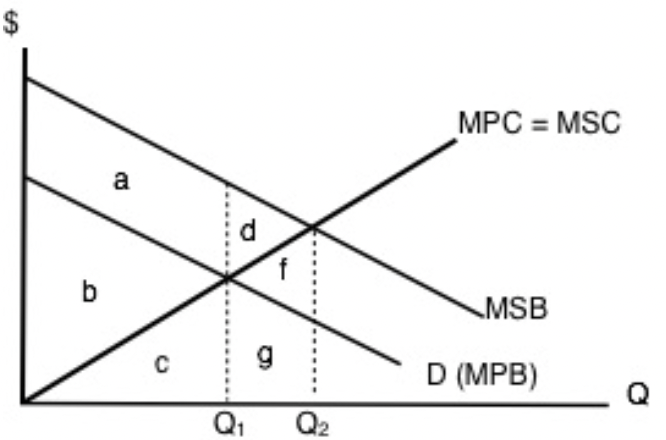
Positive Externalities in supply and demand schedule

== Difficulties in quantifying spillover effects ==
Quantifying spillover effects presents a number of challenges. Firstly, it is important to identify and measure the presence of these externalities: for instance, the spillover effects which result from the process of production often necessitate robust data collection and analysis. In order to assign a monetary value to the spillover effects of production it might be necessary to estimate such variables as healthcare costs from pollution or the value of clean water access. This presents a challenge because some of these variables lack direct market valuation. Moreover, subjectivity and uncertainty can intervene with the process since a conflict may arise among varying stakeholder perspectives. Lastly, ethical dilemmas are likely to arise in the process of quantifying spillover effects since this process involves placing a value to inherently invaluable aspects like biodiversity. It can therefore be argued that the process diminishes the intrinsic worth of these aspects.

== Methods of measuring spillovers ==
There are three main categories which contains methods for assessing international trade-related spillovers.

=== Multi-Regional Input-Output (MRIO) ===
MRIO is one of the categories of analysis which combines internationally harmonized input-output tables and trade statistics for sectors or groups of products or services of environmental use (e.g. land, water, timber), pollution (e.g. reactive nitrogen), or socioeconomis impacts (e.g. child labor, labor accidents, gender pay gap). The biggest advantage is the relative ease with which analyses can be performed for different countries. The disadvantage could be the fact that MRIO does not consider context-specific technologies, efficiencies or resource- or pollution- intensities but instead use average impacts. So, MRIO methods are best suited to assessing spillover effects of aggregate sectors or product groups at country level.

=== Life-Cycle Assessments (LCA) ===
These assessments are used to evaluate the environmental impact of individual products and their production processes across geographic and temporal scales. Moreover, they can also measure socieconomic impacts. These assessments are provided with a bottom-up method, which is an opposite to the top-down method in MRIO. The LCA are less suitable to assess spillover effects. They have to face the "truncation problem" and also requires vast volumes of data, which can be hard to get.

=== Material-Flow Analyses (MFA) ===
These analyses track specific material flows along supply chains and across countries. The tracking is primarily done for raw or less processed commodities. It cannot be as globally comprehensive as MRIO, because it also suffers from the truncation problem like LCA.

MFA is based on the quantification and measuring of matter and substances in relation to the processes in a system such as a city or country. It is confined to a specific period of time. Flows are expressed in kg/year or, alternatively, in kg/capita/year. MFA is based on the principle of matter conservation.

The aim is to identify problems and quantifying the exact impact of potential spillovers. However, it needs a large amount of data to accurately function and many countries do not have the data available to do such an analysis. On the other hand, MFA is commonly used especially in matters of Sanitation and can be used to determine the best sanitation technology. It is especially well suited to planning and decision making. It has been proven to be a suitable tool for detection of environmental problems and adequate solutions.

== Types of indexes ==
=== Spillover index ===
The index assesses the positive and negative spillover effects of each UN Member State, based on indicators tracking environmental and social spillovers embodied into trade, economic and financial spillovers, and spillover effects related to security.

=== Global Commons Stewardship Index ===
Using the MRIO trade data, environmental research, and industrial ecology, the Global Commons Stewardship Index features a global ranking and detailed features for ten countries and regions (the US, the EU, China, India, Japan, South Korea, Indonesia, the Philippines, Brazil and Indonesia) alongside sector-specific analyses of spillovers embodied in trade flows.

== Examples of spillover effects ==
=== Great Depression ===
The Great Depression that began in 1929 is a significant example of how spillover effects can occur. It all started in the United States, but spread to the rest of the world and influenced local economies for many years.

Economists debate the exact cause of the Great Depression however, it is mostly regarded as a confluence of events including the stock market crash of 1929, banking panics and monetary contraction, decreased international lending and tariffs.

A contributing factor which led to the Great Depression and Spillover effects was the stock market crash of 1929. As the stock market boomed during the 1920s it was regarded as a way to earn profit easily. However, as investors began to purchase stock through loans, the stock market began overpriced and highly financed through investor debt. Once prices fell, investors rushed to sell stock in order to limit losses leading to the spillover effects of low consumer confidence and in turn low consumer spending, investment, production and high unemployment.

=== 2008 financial crisis ===
The 2008 financial crisis is an example of how spillover effects occur both in terms of the mechanisms of a system but also geographically. Academics have found a correlation between the impact of a shock to a system and its impacts on other systems which have dependency. Due to the 2008 financial crisis, many spillover effects occurred including a strong correlation between the volatility of the United States stock markets and other global markets. This impact shows how high default rates on home loans in the US did not have isolated impacts. Rather it resulted in spillover effects into equity markets domestically as well as internationally.

=== Fukushima disaster ===
The accident at the Fukushima nuclear power statition in 2011 is another example of spillover effect. There has been a sharp decline in the stock prices of utilities that own nuclear power plants, which were observed on the Tokyo Stock Exchange. Such a catastrophe has always an impact on the other countries. One study shows that alternative energy stocks in French and German exhibit abnormal returns during the event window. This happened because market expected a change in policy towards alternative energies. On the other hand, the effect on the U.S. stocks was not confirmed.

Similar spillover effect was observed during Chernobyl nuclear-power accident. It has been shown that during 20-day period immediately following the accident, shareholders earned, on average, significant negative anbormal returns.

=== COVID-19 pandemic ===
A high-profile example of spillover effects is the COVID-19 pandemic. The global economy has become more interdependent in the 21st century as globalisation has enhanced countries' reliance on other parts of the world for economic growth. Therefore, when the emergence of the pandemic forced countries to close their borders, this had a spillover effect, creating an economic shortfall. Studies from BIS Quarterly on spillover effects in the pandemic showed that confinement measures implemented by countries to limit the number of people contracting the virus showed there is no immunity from economic spillover and spillback effects between regions. The paper notes this is true even for regions that have domestic policy measures in place to reduce the impact of economic slowdown and are not economically immune from other countries without effective measures.

On the other hand, the COVID-19 pandemic caused also some positive spillover effects. Due to the fact that many industrial plants were shut down because of the lockdown measures, pollution fell all over the world significantly.

== Influences on spillover effects ==
=== Globalisation ===
Globalisation has been a prominent influence on the economic spillover effect in the global economy. Due to rising economic interactions including trade and investment between economies, the likelihood has risen that events impact one economy will in turn impact others who have economic ties and dependencies. Recent research suggests that even a small change in US monetary policy can have significant ripple effects on economies worldwide, particularly those that are financially open or trade open. This is due to the US' dominant role in the global economic system, impacting all other countries simultaneously and leading to cross-country effects which amplify the global impact. The extent of spillover effects can vary depending on the country from which the shock originates and the recipient country. For instance, China's spillovers impact mostly through trade, while the US impacts the rest of the world mostly through financial channels, and other major economies like the Euro area, UK, and Japan have more regional impacts.

There are opposing views on the aggregate impact of globalisation as having either positive or negative spillover effects for the global economy. For instance, studies by Applied Economics journal indicates that globalisation has been impactful in promoting economic growth across nations in part due to the spillover. However studies by find that despite there being evidence that there is a positive correlation between trade openness and carbon dioxide emissions (negative externality), there could also exist benefits from globalisation impacting the environment through factors including spread of technology and knowledge beyond borders.

=== Systems built on dependency ===
Systems in society are built on relationships and interactions that create mutual value for a wide range of stakeholders. This has created circumstances where impacts to one or more of these entities can spillover to the other entities that depend on the system. This can be examined in the 2008 financial crisis. As banks granted loans to borrowers with a high chance of default, banks suffered from liquidity risk which led to significant macroeconomic impacts including losses for shareholders across all markets, significantly increased unemployment, bailouts from the Government and low investor and consumer confidence. Hence, entities like large banks can not operate in isolation, they are depended upon by many other entities in the financial system.

=== Trade policy ===
In the same way that financial crises and recessions can cause negative spillover effects through increased dependency between nations, trade policy can create positive spillover effects. It has been observed that one of the main positive spillover effects occurs as developing economies trade more with advanced economies leading to technology, information and investment flows (Dixon & O’Mahony, 2019). Data shows that China trading with more advanced economies has increased its access to new technology and information leading to improved competitiveness in global markets. It has been shown that there is a correlation between China's trade activity with OECD nations and improved domestic productivity.

=== Foreign direct investment ===
Firms who seek to minimise costs in supply chains by using resources from overseas have been shown to invest in local infrastructure. This is classified as foreign direct investment. This dynamic is common as firms from advanced economies expand their production base overseas to take advantage of cheaper labor and capital costs. Studies have shown that foreign direct investment creates productivity gains as local infrastructure of a developing nation is invested into. Examples of how this may occur are a US corporation establishes a production site in Vietnam. Around this production site is the positive spillover of increased investment in local transport infrastructure as well as a food district for the workers.

== Special considerations ==
=== Unconnected economies ===
The unconnected economies are these which are not influenced or just a little bit by spillover effects from the global market. These economies are though rarer and rarer. Even North Korea as a closed-off economy has begun to feel the spillover effects from intermittent Chinese slowdowns.

=== Safe-haven economies ===
Certain developed economies are sensitive to some economic phenomena that can overwhelm spillover effects, regardless of their strength. For example, Japan, the United States, and the Eurozone, all influenced by spillover effects from China, this influence is partly offset by investors seeking safety in their respective markets during global market uncertainties. So, if one of the economies has some difficulties, investments shift to the remaining safe-havens.

This effect was seen with the U.S. investment inflows during the EU's struggles with the Greek debt crisis in 2015. As funds flowed into U.S. Treasuries, yields decreased, reducing borrowing costs for American consumers, borrowers, and businesses. This serves as an illustration of a positive spillover effect from the perspective of U.S. consumers.

== See also ==
- Carbon leakage, in climate policy
- Indirect land use change impacts of biofuels, in climate policy
- Knowledge spillover
