= List of University of Leicester people =

This list of University of Leicester people is a selected list of notable past staff and students of the University of Leicester.

== Chancellors ==
- Edgar Adrian, 1st Baron Adrian (1957–1971)
- Alan Lloyd Hodgkin (1971–1984)
- Sir George Porter (1984–1995)
- Sir Michael Atiyah (1995–2005)
- Sir Peter Williams (2005–2010)
- Bruce Grocott, Baron Grocott (2013–2018)
- David Willetts, Baron Willetts (2018–2023)
- Dame Maggie Aderin-Pocock (2023–)

== Vice-Chancellors ==
- Charles Wilson (1957–1961)
- Fraser Noble (1962–1976)
- Mauri nboce Shock (1977–1987)
- Kenneth Edwards (1987–1999)
- Robert Burgess (1999–2014)
- Paul Boyle (2014–2019)
- Nishan Canagarajah (from November 2019)

== Notable academics ==
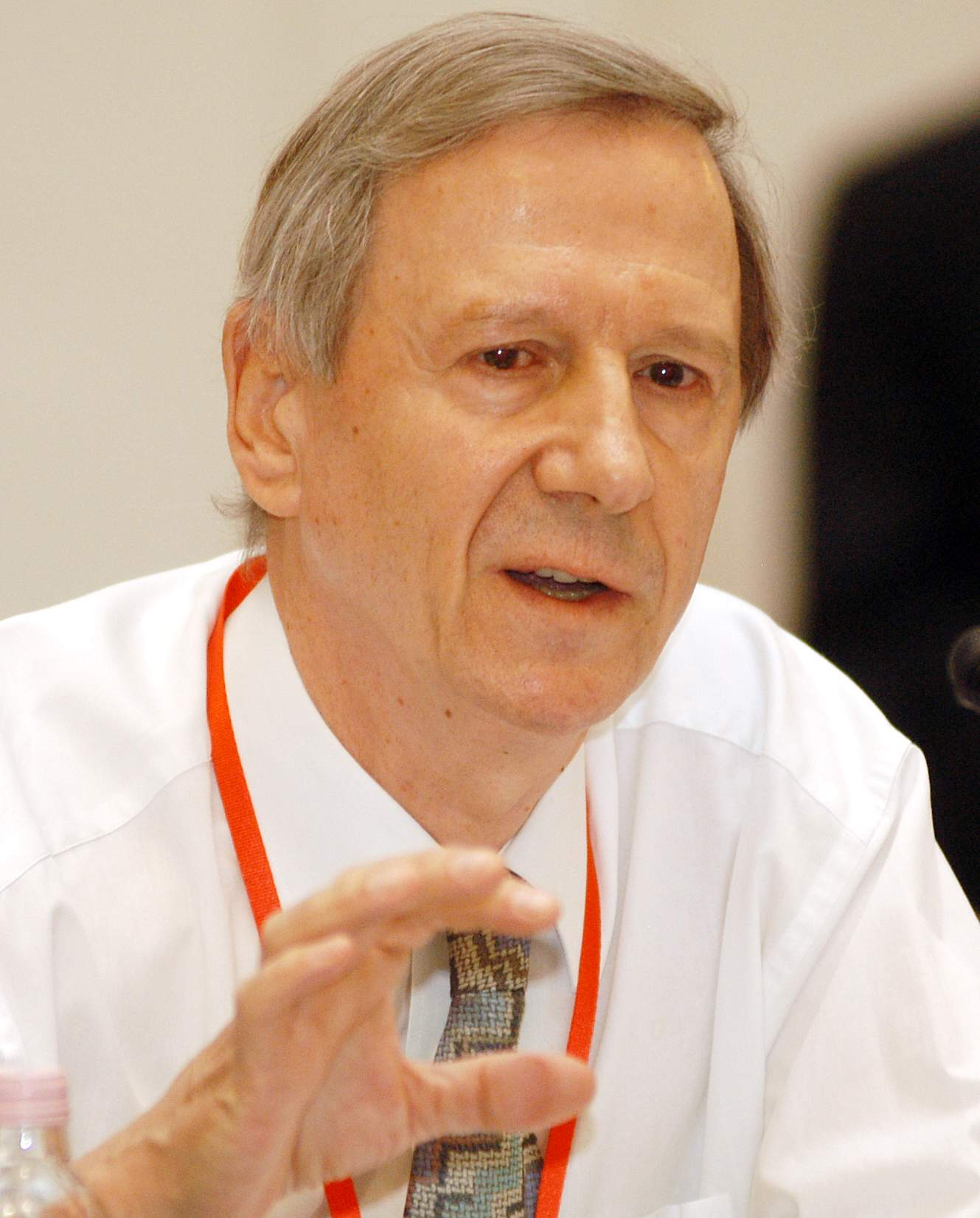
Anthony Giddens, sociologist

- Khurshid Ahmad, Islamic scholar
- Chris Allen, British sociologist and associate professor at the Centre for Hate Studies at the University of Leicester
- Penelope Allison, Professor of Archaeology
- Lyman Andrews, American Studies
- Isobel Armstrong, scholar of nineteenth-century poetry and women's writing
- Graeme Barker, Disney Professor of Archaeology, University of Cambridge
- Martin Barstow, astronomer and former President of the Royal Astronomical Society
- Andrew Blain, astronomer
- Richard Bonney, historian
- Alan Bryman, social scientist
- Emma Bunce, space physicist and former President of the Royal Astronomical Society
- Grace Burrows, violinist and orchestra conductor
- Neil Christie, Reader in Archaeology
- Nicholas T. Clerk, Ghanaian academic, public administrator and Presbyterian minister
- John Coffey, Professor of Early Modern history
- Heather Couper, astronomer and television presenter
- Rosemary Crompton, sociologist
- Nicholas J. Cull, US historian
- Panicos Demetriades, economist and Governor of the Central Bank of Cyprus
- Gabriel Dover, geneticist
- Eric Dunning, sports sociologist
- Christopher Dyer, medieval historian
- Colin Eaborn, chemist
- Norbert Elias, German sociologist
- Brian J. Ford, scientist, visiting professor
- G. S. Fraser, Scottish poet
- Ali A. F. Al-Furaih, professor of geology
- Yair Galily, behavioural scientist
- Anthony Giddens, prominent sociologist, taught social psychology at Leicester
- Reuben Goodstein, mathematician, proponent of Goodstein's theorem
- Cosmo Graham, public law and competition law specialist, member of the Competition Commission
- Sarah Hainsworth, Professor of Materials and Forensic Engineering, involved in analysing the wounds on the skeleton of Richard III
- Rosalind Hill, historian
- Jeffrey A. Hoffman, NASA astronaut and physicist
- Richard Hoggart, sociologist
- W. G. Hoskins, (1931–1952) (1965–1968), local historian, author of The Making of the English Landscape
- Norman Housley, crusading historian
- Jeremy Howick, director of the Stoneygate Centre for Excellence in Empathic Healthcare and inaugural Professor of Empathic Healthcare
- Arthur Humphreys, inaugural Professor of English and first Dean of the Faculty of Arts
- Leonard Huxley, physicist
- Suzanne Imber, planetary scientist and winner of the 2017 BBC Two television programme Astronauts, Do You Have What It Takes?
- Sir Alec Jeffreys, geneticist, discoverer of genetic fingerprinting
- Hans Kornberg, biochemist
- Philip Larkin, librarian and poet
- Loretta Lees, Urban Geographer
- David Mattingly, Roman archaeologist
- Tara McCormack, academic and author
- John McManners, former Head of History Dept., Regius Professor of History at the University of Oxford until retirement
- Marilyn Palmer, archaeologist and landscape historian, Professor of Industrial Archaeology and Head of the School of Archaeology and Ancient History (2000–2006)
- Ken Pounds, Emeritus Professor of Physics, discovered black holes were common in the universe
- Charles Rees, organic chemist
- Martin Rees, Baron Rees of Ludlow, the Astronomer Royal, visiting professor at Leicester
- Adrian Henry Wardle Robinson, geographer and historian of maritime surveying
- J.B. Schneewind, philosophy professor, Johns Hopkins University
- Malcolm Shaw, The Sir Robert Jennings Professor of International Law, prominent international lawyer and jurist
- Jack Simmons, Professor of History (1947–1975)
- Brian Simon, Professor of Education (1966–1980)
- Nial Tanvir, astronomer
- Abraham Wasserstein, Professor of Classics (1960–1969) and Dean of the Faculty of Arts
- Sami Zubaida, political scientist

== Notable alumni ==
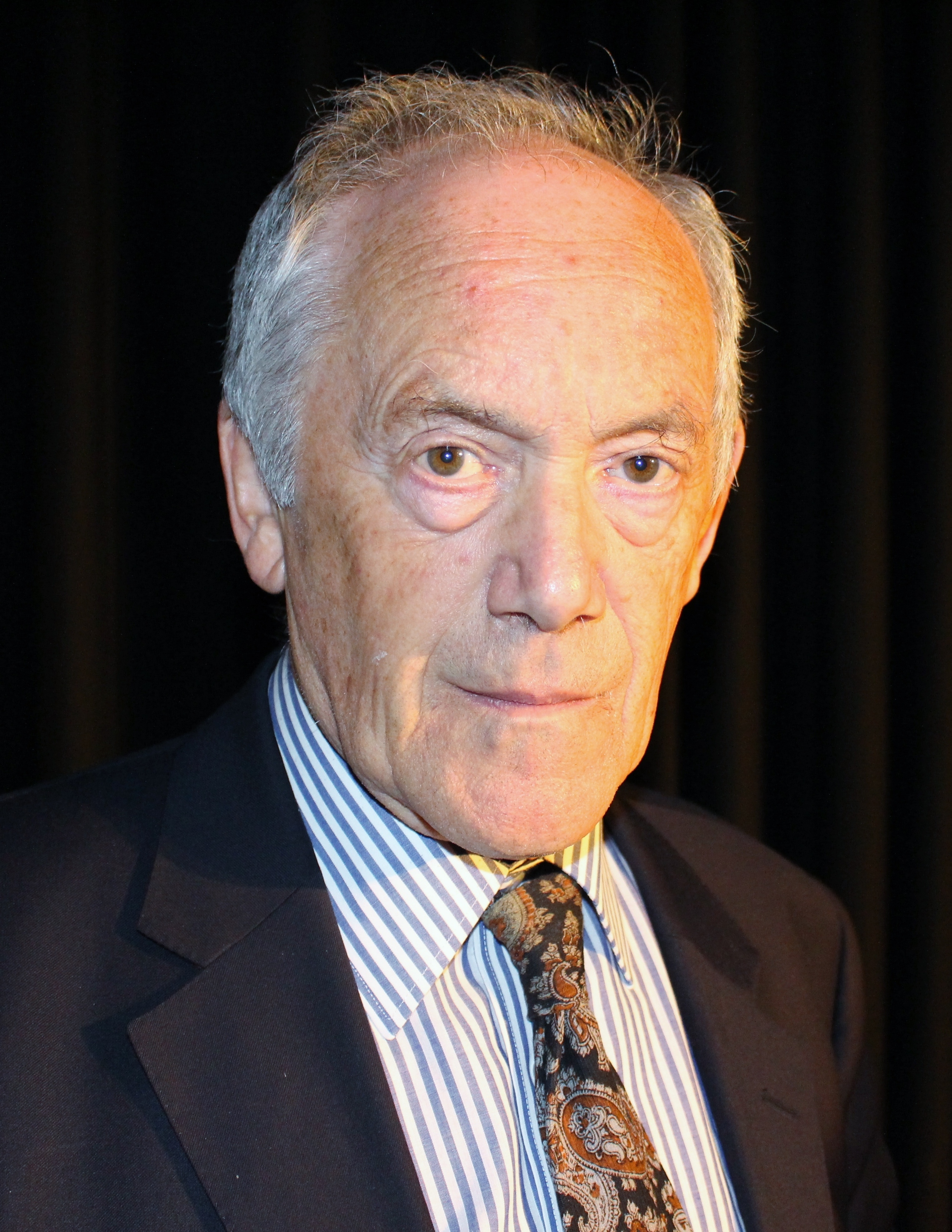
Peter Atkins, chemist

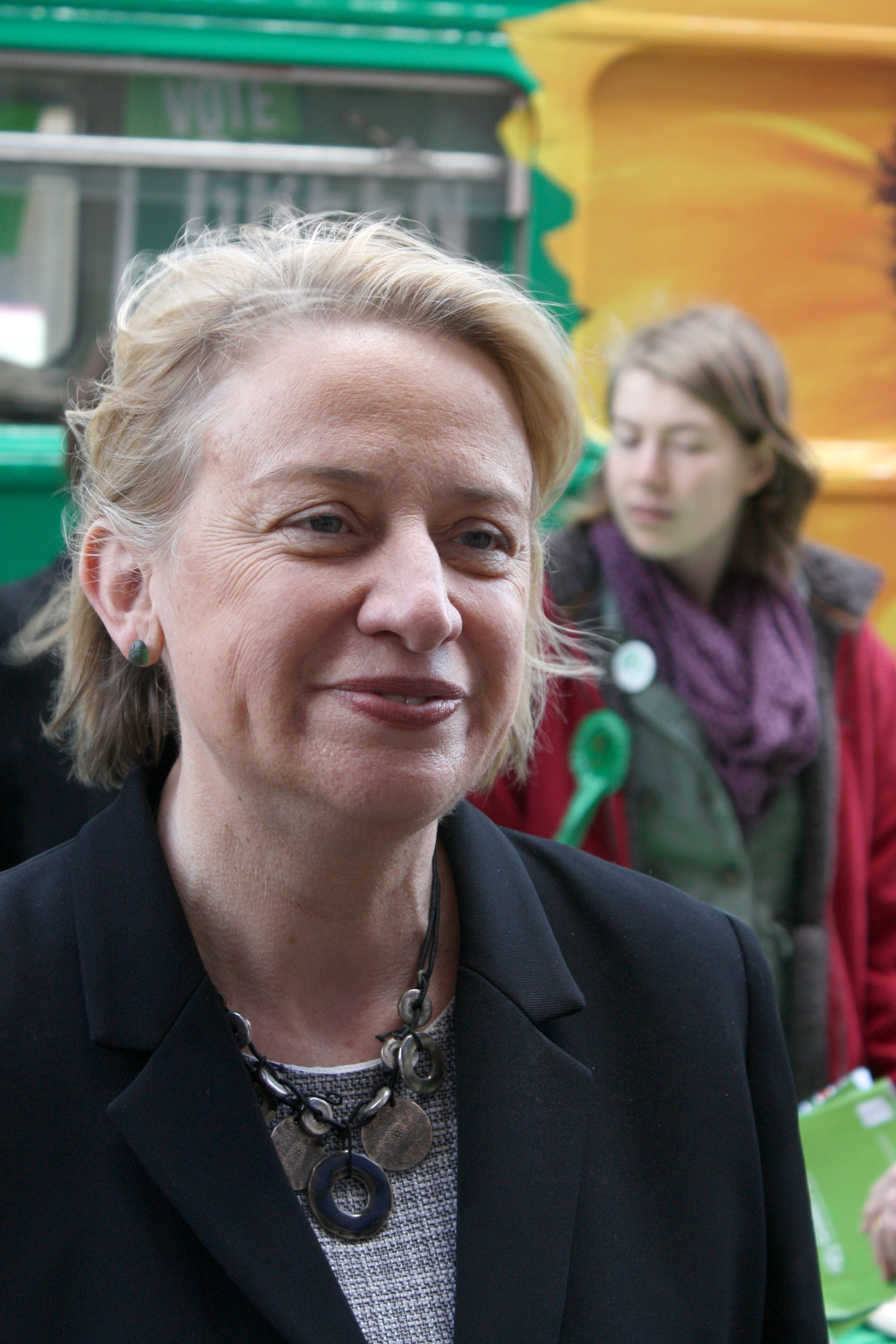
Natalie Bennett, British politician

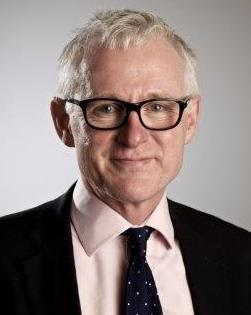
Norman Lamb, MP

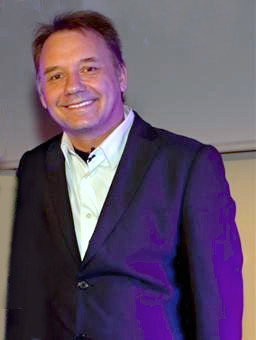
Bob Mortimer, comedian

- Malik Zahoor Ahmad, Pakistan Minister of Information
- Arrmanatha Nasir, Foreign Minister of Indonesia
- Peter Atkins, physical chemist
- Joy Belmonte, Filipino politician, Mayor of Quezon City, former Vice Mayor of Quezon City
- Natalie Bennett, former leader of the Green Party of England and Wales
- David Blanchflower, economist, Dartmouth College professor
- Sir Malcolm Bradbury, author
- Terry Brugha, Irish psychiatrist and epidemiologist
- Justin Chadwick, actor and director
- Philip Campbell, editor-in-chief of Nature
- Andy Carter - Conservative MP for Warrington South.
- Michael Cordy, novelist
- Liam Donaldson, UK Chief Medical Officer
- Bruce Grocott, Baron Grocott, former MP, Captain of the Gentlemen-at-Arms
- Phelan Hill, Team GB coxswain and Olympic bronze medallist
- Baroness Howarth of Breckland, peer, on the board of CAFCASS
- Atifete Jahjaga, President of Kosovo
- Jinnwoo, British folk musician and visual artist
- Graham Joyce, novelist
- Jyrki Katainen, Prime Minister of Finland
- Norman Lamb, MP
- Martin Löb, logician and proposer of Löb's theorem
- Katie King, curator
- Mako Komuro, formerly Princess Mako of Akishino, Japanese art historian
- Pete McCarthy, writer, broadcaster, comedian
- Sunshine Martyn, reality television star
- Bob Mortimer, comedian
- Vipul Mudgal, journalist, researcher and activist
- Massimiliano Neri, fashion model
- Michael Nicholson, journalist
- Inke Maris, senior Indonesian journalist, communications consultant
- Bob Parr, Emmy Award-winning television producer and former Special Air Service soldier
- David Perry, barrister
- J. H. Plumb, historian of 18th-century Britain
- John-Henry Phillips, author and Romani archaeologist.
- Patrick Redmond, novelist
- Derek Schmidt, member of the U.S. House Of Representatives, former Attorney General of Kansas
- Steven M. Smith, Emeritus Professor of Genetics and Biochemistry, University of Tasmania
- C. P. Snow, Physical Chemist, Director of the English Electric Company, Author, Life Peer
- Mary Ann Steggles, Commonwealth Scholar from Canada, international expert on British sculpture exported to the Indian subcontinent and Southeast Asia
- Sir John Stevens, former Metropolitan Police Commissioner and former adviser on international security issues to Gordon Brown
- John Sutherland, Guardian columnist, Emeritus Professor of English Literature, University College London
- Laurie Taylor, broadcaster, actor, sociologist
- Philip Tew, professor of English (Post-1900 Literature), Brunel University, novelist
- Steven Thiru, current president of Malaysian Bar
- Jon Tickle, celebrity
- Bosun Tijani, Nigerian minister of Communications, Innovation and Digital Economy
- Storm Thorgerson, artist
- Tony Underwood, England rugby union international
- Sir Alan Walters, economist and former Chief Economic Adviser to Margaret Thatcher, 1981–83 and 1989.
- Andrew Waterman, poet
- Quentin Willson, motoring journalist/expert and TV presenter
- Bryan R. Wilson, Oxford sociologist
- Ted Wragg, educationalist
