= National Astronomy Meeting =

Scientific conference of astronomers

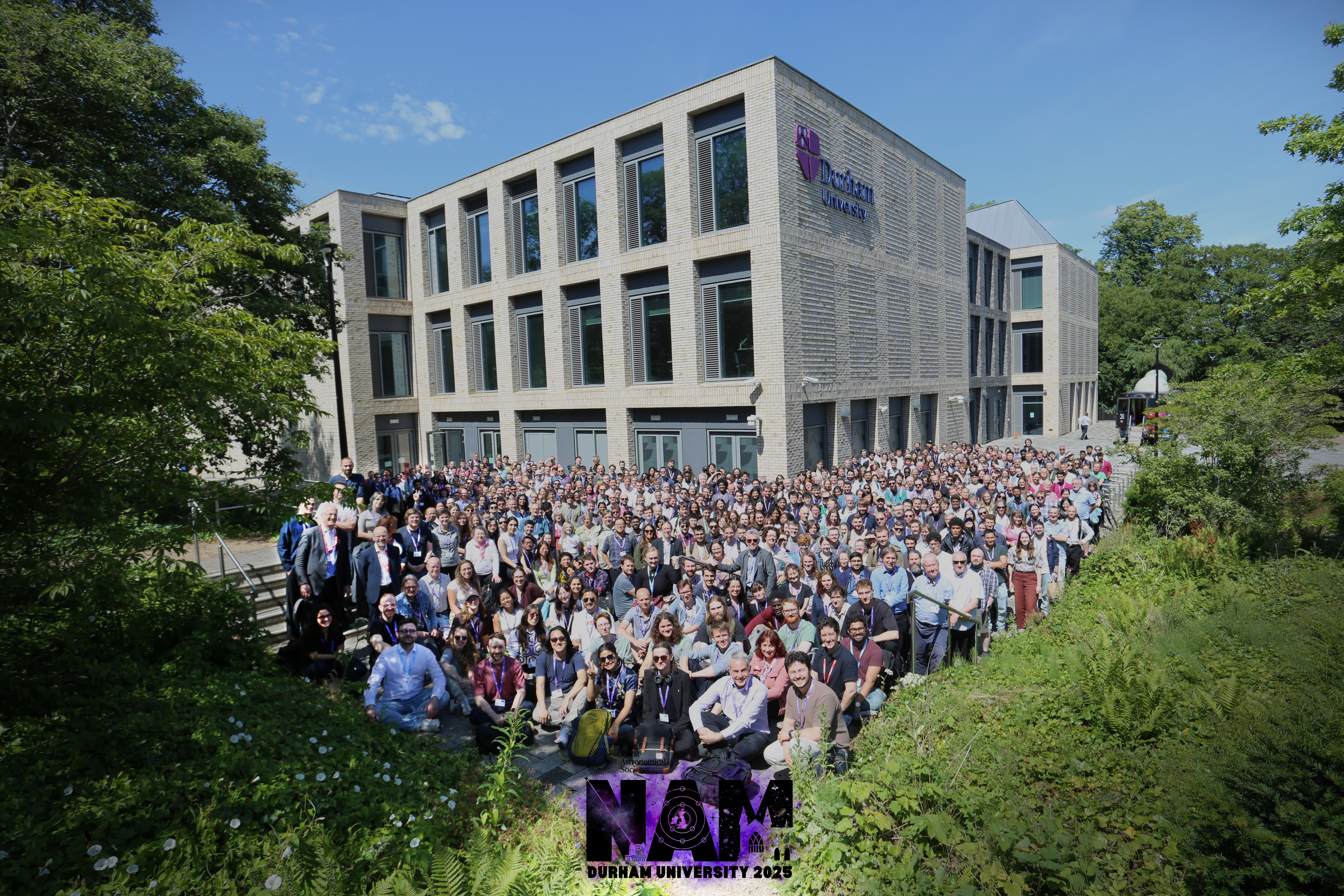
- Conference photo for the 2025 National Astronomy Meeting, hosted at Durham University.
- Genre: Academic conference
- Frequency: Annual
- Venue: Varies, usually within the British Isles
- Years active: 78
- Inaugurated: 1948
- Previous event: July 2026, University of Birmingham
- Next event: July 2027, University of Leeds
- Participants: approx. 600
- Major events: Astronomy, solar physics and related fields
- Organiser: Royal Astronomical Society
- Website: www.ras.org.uk/events-and-meetings/ras-meetings

The National Astronomy Meeting (NAM) is an annual scientific conference of astronomers, usually held in the British Isles. It is sponsored and coordinated by the Royal Astronomical Society (RAS), and functions as the primary annual meeting of the society. NAM is one of the largest professional astronomy conferences in Europe, with typically around 600 delegates attending.

Each NAM includes a variety of plenary and parallel sessions discussing the latest research in astronomy (and related fields), public lectures, community sessions and a press office to promote the results presented at the meeting to journalists and the public.

The meetings began when the RAS decided to hold some of its scientific meetings outside London, where the society is based. Known as the 'out of town' meetings, the first was held in 1948. The meetings ran in most years until 1966, when they were discontinued. (Note: The only 'out of town' meeting during the period 1967-75 was actually held in London, albeit in a different location to usual, in 1969.)

The RAS resumed the series in 1976. An expanded format was adopted from 1992 onwards; to reflect this broader remit the name was changed to the 'National Astronomy Meeting'. Since 1976 the meeting has been held every year, except in 2000 when the General Assembly of the International Astronomical Union was held in the UK instead, and 2020 due to the COVID-19 pandemic in the United Kingdom.

== History ==
The Royal Astronomical Society (RAS) was formed in 1820; one of its major activities was to host scientific meetings. Typically eight meetings each year were held at its headquarters in London (a practice which continues today). The growth of astronomical research throughout the UK and the concurrent increase in the number of RAS Fellows beyond the London area led to increased demand for meetings outside the capital. Although occasional meetings were held in other locations to mark special events, the RAS did not institute a regular programme of meetings outside London until after the major disruption to RAS activities caused by the Second World War.

The solution was to move one of the society's meetings outside London each year, terming them 'out of town' meetings. The first of these was held in Edinburgh in 1948. The society was reluctant to move any of the regular eight meetings, which ran from October to May, so the 'out of town' meeting was held as an additional ninth meeting during the summer break in the academic year. They were held in the summer or early autumn in most years until 1966 when the RAS Council decided to stop asking groups to host them. The subsequent lack of meetings outside London was unpopular with Fellows, so the 'out of town' meetings were reintroduced in 1976, but moved to April. They replaced the usual monthly RAS meeting for that month and were usually held during universities' Easter holidays.

There was no set format to the out of town meetings, which were originally held over a single day, but during the 1960s some lasted three days. They were often limited in topical scope. Ken Pounds, the President of the RAS from 1990 to 1992, proposed expanding their remit into a more general meeting, inspired by the large meetings of the British Association and the American Astronomical Society. The goal was to attract a broad section of the UK astronomy research community and provide a focus for media attention on the discipline. To reflect this newly expanded format, the series was renamed the 'National Astronomy Meeting' (NAM) from 1992 onwards.

The meetings continued to be held around Easter until 2012, except in 1999 when NAM moved to August to coincide with the 1999 solar eclipse, visible from the venue. From 2013 onwards NAM has been held in late June or early July, during universities' summer holidays. Since 1994, each meeting has lasted four or five days. There was no NAM in the year 2000 because the much larger General Assembly of the International Astronomical Union was being held in Manchester and thus was the major UK astronomy meeting of that year.

== Format ==
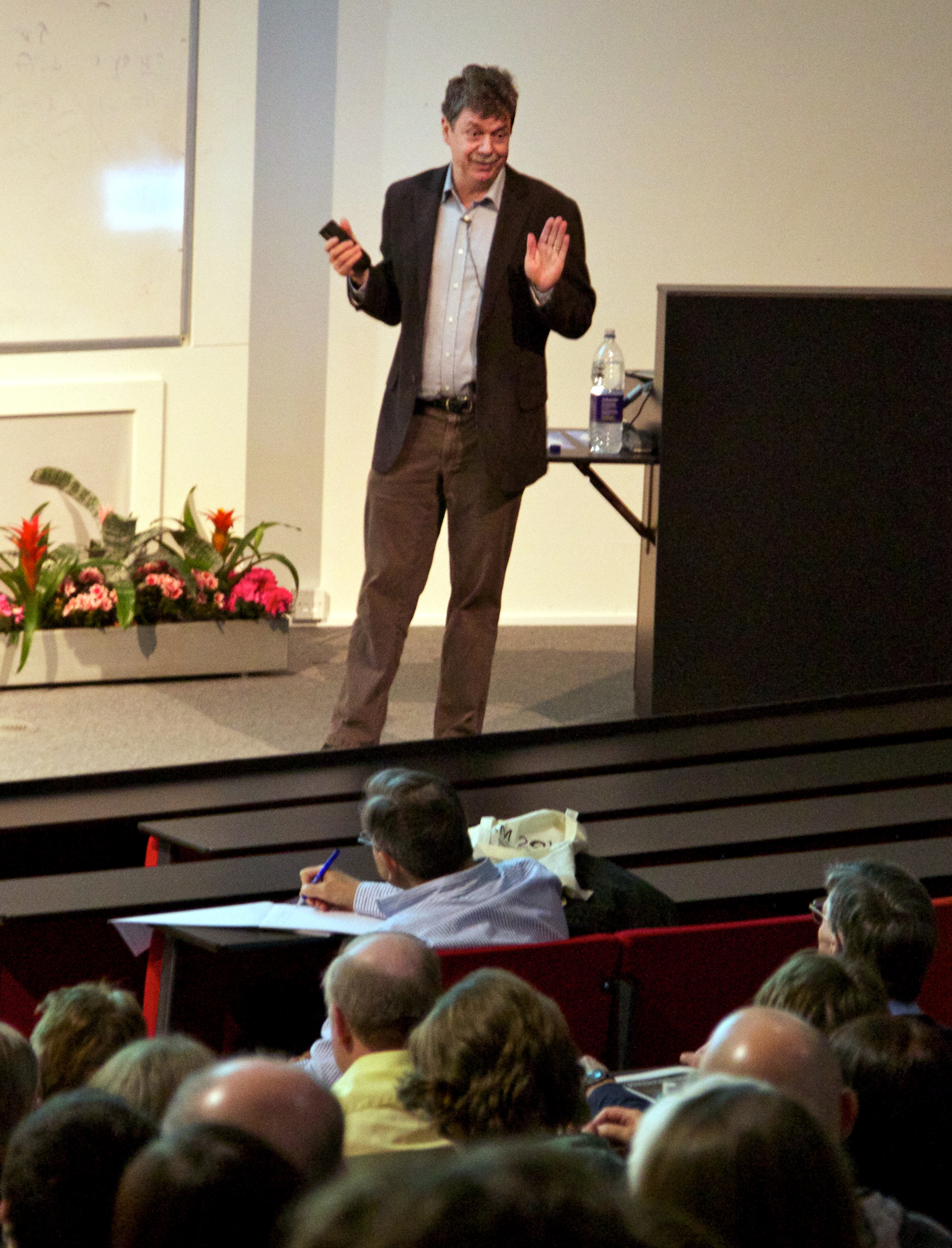
Simon White addressing the 2012 National Astronomy Meeting

Each NAM lasts four or five days and normally includes:

- Plenary talks every day on topics of broad interest to astronomy.
- Parallel sessions on specialised areas of research every day, with several running concurrently. Fellows of the RAS can propose topics for the sessions held at each meeting, in exchange for the proposer organising and chairing the session.
- The annual meetings of the UK Solar Physics (UKSP) and Magnetosphere Ionosphere and Solar-Terrestrial physics group (MIST), usually running as parallel sessions.
- A 'town hall meeting' to discuss science policy and funding issues with the Royal Astronomical Society, Science and Technology Facilities Council and the UK Space Agency.
- Public lectures aimed at local members of the public.
- Presentations of the annual awards of the Royal Astronomical Society.
- A 'teachers day' for school and/or university educators.
- Various community discussion sessions or networking lunches on topics such as careers, diversity etc.
- A social programme for delegates, including a formal conference dinner and a five-a-side football tournament.
- A press office and media relations team for journalists.

Meetings are usually held in a UK university or research institute active in astronomy, who organise and host the meeting. The RAS provides financial sponsorship, advertising, media relations etc. and run some sessions within the meeting. Universities see hosting the meeting as an opportunity to promote their astronomical research and attract undergraduate students in the discipline. However, in some recent years (e.g. 2011, 2015) the RAS has taken on the full organisation of the whole meeting itself, which is then held at a conference centre rather than a university.

The meetings are open to anyone who pays the registration fee; although membership of the RAS is not required, Fellows of the RAS do receive a reduced price. Most attendees are professional research astronomers or postgraduate students, but interested amateur astronomers, undergraduates, school teachers, journalists etc. are also welcome. Typically there are around 500-600 registered attendees, but the 2009 event (which was combined with the annual meeting of the European Astronomical Society) drew a record of 1100 delegates.

== Meetings ==
Start	End	Host	Notes	Reference
1948		Edinburgh		
1950		Royal Irish Academy, Dublin		
1951		University College of the South West, Exeter		
1952		University of Leeds		
1953		University of Durham	Actually held in Newcastle	
1954			Not held, due to an expedition to view the Solar eclipse of June 30, 1954 in Sweden	
1955		University of Glasgow		
1956		University of Bristol		
1957			Not held	
1958		University College of North Staffordshire, Keele		
1959			Not held	
1960		Institution of Civil Engineers, London	Dedicated to the topic of British space research	
1962		Queen's University Belfast		
1963		Royal Society of Edinburgh		
1964		University of Newcastle		
1965		Royal Irish Academy, Dublin	Joint symposium to celebrate the centenary of William Rowan Hamilton's death. Held over three days.	
1966		University of Exeter	Three day meeting	
1967			Not held, due to a joint meeting with the Institute of Physics at Jodrell Bank	
1968			Not held	
1969		Royal Institute of Navigation	Held at the Royal Geographical Society, London	
1970			Not held, instead a set of Celebration Lectures were given at the RAS to mark 150 years since the society was founded	
1971			Not held	
1972			Not held	
1973			Not held	
1974			Not held	
1975			Not held	
9 April 1976		University of Manchester		
6 April 1977		University of Edinburgh		
14 April 1978		University of York		
11 April 1979		University of Durham		
16 April 1980		University College, Cardiff		
16 April 1981		University of Bath		
7 April 1982		Royal Irish Academy, Dublin		
8 April 1983		University of Keele		
12 April 1984		University of Leicester		
11 April 1985		University of Liverpool		
10 April 1986		University of Leeds		
9 April 1987		University of Manchester		
30 March 1988		Lancashire Polytechnic, Preston		
30 March 1989		De Blije Werelt , Lunteren, Netherlands	First meeting outside the British Isles	
5 April 1990		University of Glasgow		
4 April 1991		Armagh Observatory		
8 April 1992	10 April 1992	University of Durham	First to use the 'National Astronomy Meeting' name. Attendance was ~300 over 3 days	
1993		University of Leicester	Attendance was 330 over 3 days	
1994		Heriot-Watt University, Edinburgh	Attendance was 416 over 4 days	
1995		University of Cardiff	Attendance was 200+ over 4 days	
1996		Liverpool John Moores University	Attendance was 480 over 4 days	
1997		University of Southampton	Attendance was 160 over 4 days	
1998		University of St Andrews	Attendance was 480 over 4 days	
1999		Guernsey	Coincided with the Solar eclipse of August 11, 1999, visible from the nearby island of Alderney. Attendance was ~700.	
2000			Not held due to the General Assembly of the International Astronomical Union in Manchester	
2001		University of Cambridge	Attendance was 553 over 4 days	
2002		University of Bristol	Attendance was 361 over 4 days	
2003		Dublin Castle	Organised by a group of five Irish universities, attendance was 550+ over 4 days	
2004		Open University, Milton Keynes	Attendance was 450 over 5 days	
2005		University of Birmingham	Attendance was 434 over 5 days	
2006		University of Leicester	Attendance was 390 over 5 days	
16 April 2007	20 April 2007	University of Central Lancashire, Preston	Attendance was ~500 over 5 days	
31 March 2008	4 April 2008	Queen's University Belfast	Attendance was 658	
20 April 2009	23 April 2009	University of Hertfordshire, Hatfield	As part of the European Week of Astronomy and Space Science (EWASS), combined with the European Astronomical Society's Joint European and National Astronomy Meeting (JENAM). Part of the International Year of Astronomy. Attendance was 1081 over 4 days.	
12 April 2010	16 April 2010	University of Glasgow	Celebrating the 250 year anniversary of the Regius Professor of Astronomy. Attendance was 551 over 5 days	
17 April 2011	21 April 2011	Venue Cymru, Llandudno	Organised by the RAS itself. Attendance was 437 over 4 days.	
27 March 2012	30 March 2012	University of Manchester	Combined with the annual meeting of the German Astronomische Gesellschaft. Attendance was 850 over 4 days.	
1 July 2013	5 July 2013	University of St Andrews	Attendance was 414 over 4 days	
23 June 2014	26 June 2014	University of Portsmouth	Attendance was ~600 over 4 days	
5 July 2015	9 July 2015	Venue Cymru, Llandudno	Organised by the RAS itself. The awards ceremony was presented by comedian Jon Culshaw. Attendance was ~500 over 4 days.	
27 June 2016	1 July 2016	University of Nottingham (Jubilee Campus)	Held a few days after the 2016 United Kingdom European Union membership referendum, which dominated discussion at the meeting. Attendance was 500| over 5 days.	
2 July 2017	6 July 2017	University of Hull		
3 April 2018	6 April 2018	Arena and Convention Centre Liverpool	Combined with European Week of Astronomy and Space Science; local organisation by Liverpool John Moores University. Attendance was over 1300.	
30 June 2019	4 July 2019	Lancaster University		
2020			Not held due to the COVID-19 pandemic. Originally scheduled for 12–17 July at the University of Bath, which hosted the 2021 meeting instead.	
19 July 2021	23 July 2021	University of Bath	Online virtual meeting due to the COVID-19 pandemic	
11 July 2022	15 July 2022	University of Warwick	Hybrid online/in-person meeting	
3 July 2023	7 July 2023	Cardiff University	Hybrid online/in-person meeting	
14 July 2024	19 July 2024	University of Hull	Hybrid online/in-person meeting	
7 July 2025	11 July 2025	University of Durham	Hybrid online/in-person meeting. Registered attendance was almost 1000.	
20 July 2026	24 July 2026	University of Birmingham	Hybrid online/in-person meeting	
11 July 2027	16 July 2027	University of Leeds		

== See also ==
- General Assembly of the International Astronomical Union
