= David Southwood =

British space scientist

David Southwood CBE FRAeS
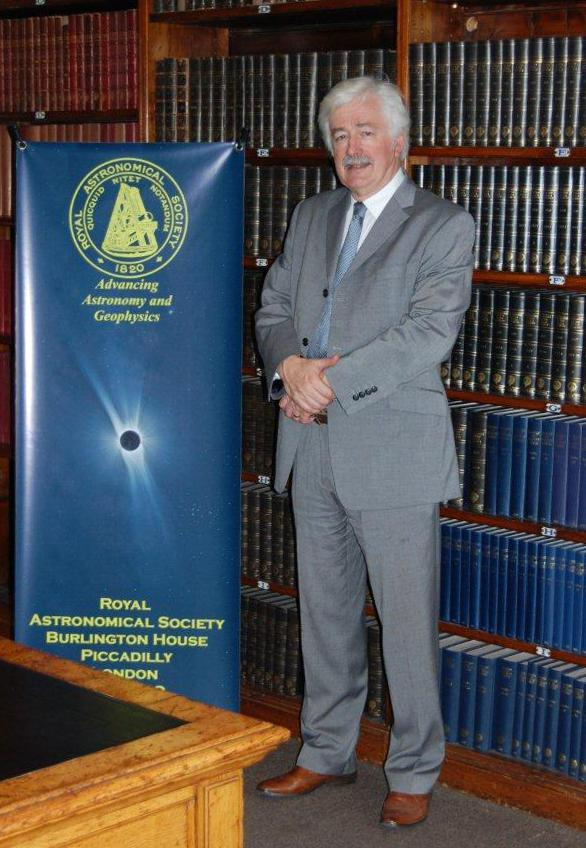
- Southwood as President of the Royal Astronomical Society

88th President of the Royal Astronomical Society
- In office May 2012 – May 2014
- Preceded by: Roger Davies
- Succeeded by: Martin Barstow

Personal details
- Born: 30 June 1945 (age 81) Torquay, Devon, UK
- Website: www3.imperial.ac.uk/people/d.southwood
- Scientific career
- Education: Queen Mary, University of London, Imperial College London
- Known for: Magnetospheres of planets and moons Director of Science at the European Space Agency; President of the Royal Astronomical Society
- Awards: James B. Macelwane Medal (1981); NASA Distinguished Public Service Medal (2011); Sir Arthur Clarke Award (2011)
- Fields: Space science, robotic spacecraft
- Workplaces: University of California, Los Angeles, Imperial College London, European Space Agency, Royal Astronomical Society

David John Southwood CBE (born 30 June 1945) is a British space scientist who holds the post of Senior Research Investigator at Imperial College London. He was the President of the Royal Astronomical Society from 2012–2014, and Director of Science and Robotic Exploration at the European Space Agency from 2001–2011. Southwood's research interests have been in solar–terrestrial physics and planetary science, particularly magnetospheres. He built the magnetic field instrument for the Cassini Saturn orbiter.

== Early life and education ==
Southwood was born in Torquay, Devon, and attended Cockington County Primary School, then Torquay Boys' Grammar School. At school he specialized in languages. However, he studied mathematics for his first degree at Queen Mary College, London, graduating in 1966. He obtained a PhD in physics from Imperial College London with a thesis on the theory and data analysis of low-frequency waves in the Earth's space environment.

His PhD work led to the first direct evidence for Kelvin-Helmholtz instability at the Earth's magnetopause.

== Research career ==
Southwood conducted post-doctoral research at the University of California, Los Angeles, working on magnetometer data from the ATS-1 spacecraft. He then returned to Imperial College in 1971, where he produced a theory of field-line resonances in the Earth's magnetosphere which now underpins most work on geomagnetic pulsations.

In 1982 Southwood founded a space and atmospheric physics research group at Imperial; along with André Balogh he decided to focus the group's experimental work on space magnetometers. Over the following decades Southwood and this research group were involved in missions including Ulysses, Mars 96, Cluster, Cassini, Rosetta, BepiColombo, and Solar Orbiter. The magnetometer on the Cassini Saturn orbiter found the first signatures that led to the discovery of geysers on the moon Enceladus.

Southwood was also a co-investigator on the magnetometer team led by Margaret G. Kivelson for the Galileo mission to Jupiter. The magnetic field measurements made by this magnetometer led to several discoveries concerning the magnetism of the Galilean moons and asteroid Gaspra. From 1994 to 1997 Southwood was head of the Blackett Laboratory at Imperial College.

== European Space Agency ==
In 1997 Southwood retired as Head of Physics at Imperial College and became Head of Earth Observation Strategy at the European Space Agency (ESA). There he developed the Earth Observation Envelope Programme (EOEP), resulting in the Cryosat, GOCE, SMOS, and EarthCARE missions. In parallel he laid the basis for what became the GMES series of spacecraft.

Southwood's move to ESA had been intended as a short-term one, which would be over long before Cassini arrived at Saturn in 2004. But after a brief return to Imperial, in May 2001 he became Director of Science at ESA. The first launch under his directorship was the gamma-ray observatory Integral in October 2002. This was followed by three low-cost planetary missions: Smart-1 to the Moon (2003), Mars Express (2003), and Venus Express (2005). Mars Express and Venus Express each used a large amount of hardware in common with the Rosetta mission to comet Churyumov-Gerasimenko (launched 2004). On 14 January 2005 ESA's Huygens probe, which had detached from the Cassini mission to Saturn, landed successfully on Saturn's largest moon, Titan. Southwood later described the Huygens landing as "the highest point of all" from his ESA career. Southwood had also led the team which developed the magnetometer on the main Cassini spacecraft.

During 2003 ESA launched a largely British lander, Beagle 2, which was carried to Mars by the larger Mars Express spacecraft. All contact with Beagle 2 was lost before it reached the surface of Mars, and the project was considered a failure. ESA was heavily criticised for its management of the mission. Southwood suffered public criticism in the UK for not supporting Beagle 2 enough, and in France for supporting it at all. Following a report criticising the mission, Southwood admitted that "too high a level of risk was taken" but refused to criticise the leader of the project, Colin Pillinger.

During Southwood's tenure, ESA expanded its cooperation with other space agencies. ESA worked with China on the Double Star and Chang’e missions, and with India on Chandrayaan-1. Collaborative missions initiated with the US included the James Webb Space Telescope, where Southwood secured the flight of two predominantly European instruments (MIRI and NirSpec) and arranged a European launch on Ariane 5.

In 2008, Southwood became ESA's first Director of Science and Robotic Exploration. There he took over responsibility for the ExoMars programme. He drew up a new plan in which ExoMars would be split into two missions jointly undertaken with NASA, but the US withdrew support and the ESA missions continue with a new collaboration with Roscosmos. In 2009, two large astronomical spacecraft, Herschel and Planck, were launched.

== Royal Astronomical Society ==
Southwood retired from ESA during 2011 and returned to Imperial College. The same year, he stood for election as President of the Royal Astronomical Society, where he had previously served as vice-president from 1989–1991. He began his two-year tenure as president in May 2012, and served until May 2014 when he was succeeded by Martin Barstow.

== Awards ==
Southwood has received the following awards and prizes:

- Commander of the Order of the British Empire (CBE) in the 2019 Birthday Honours for services to space science and industry.
- Honorary Doctorate of Science from Plymouth University, 2011
- Fellow of the Royal Aeronautical Society, 2011
- Sir Arthur Clarke Award for Exceptional Space Achievement, 2011
- NASA Distinguished Public Service Medal, 2011
- James B. Macelwane Medal, 1981
- 2025: Main belt asteroid 6033 Southwood named after Southwood.
