= Mike Cruise =

British astronomer and astrophysicist (1947–2026)

Mike Cruise OBE FRAS
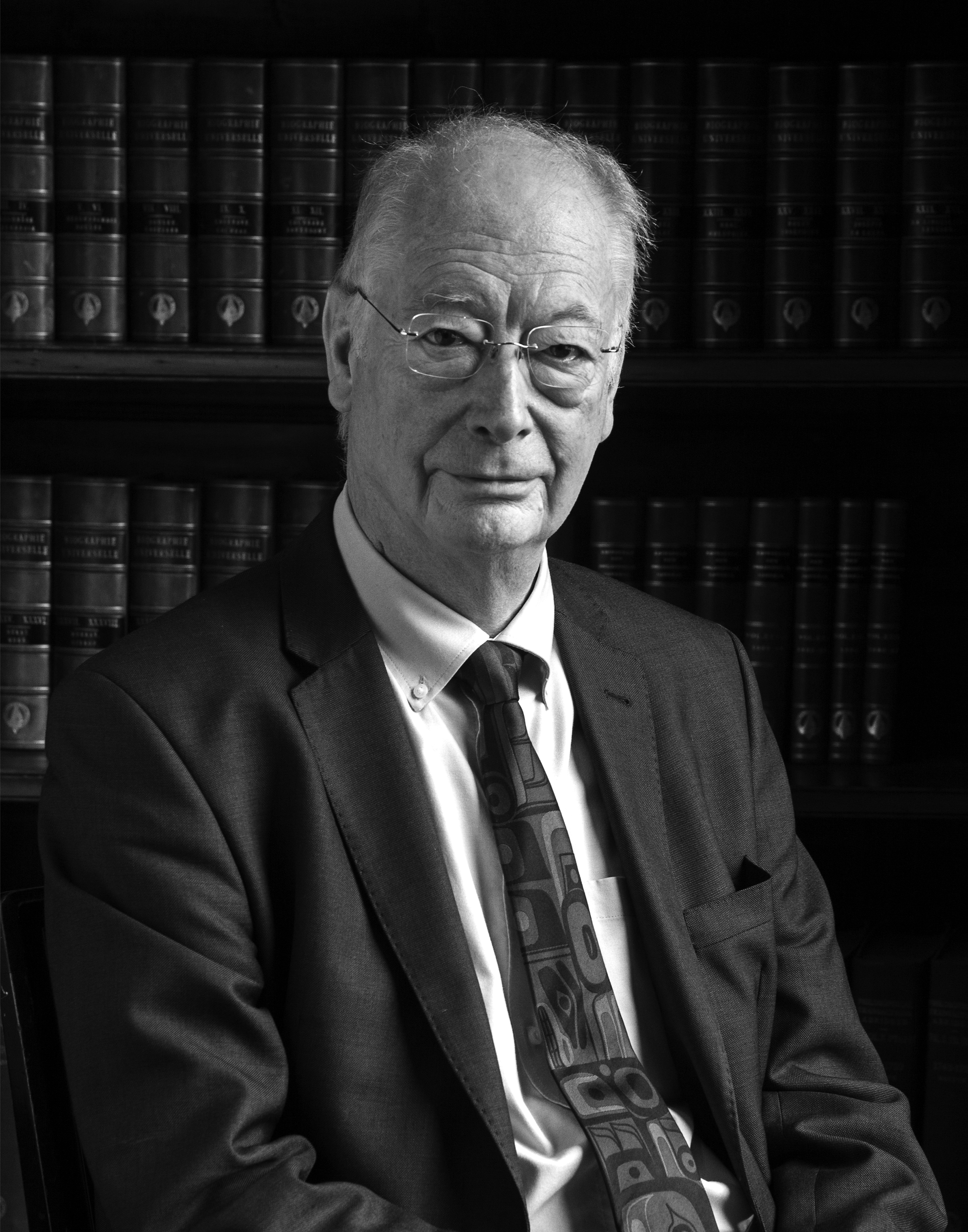
- Cruise in 2019
- Born: Adrian Michael Cruise; 12 May 1947; Wales
- Died: 7 February 2026 (aged 78)
- Education: University College London (BSc, PhD)
- Awards: OBE (2024); Team member, Breakthrough Prize in Fundamental Physics (2016); Team member, Gruber Prize in Cosmology (2016)
- Scientific career
- Fields: X-ray astronomy, spacecraft instrumentation, gravitational-wave detectors
- Workplaces: University of Birmingham; Rutherford Appleton Laboratory; Mullard Space Science Laboratory

Adrian Michael Cruise OBE FRAS (12 May 1947 – 7 February 2026) was a British astronomer and astrophysicist. Initially an X-ray astronomer, he also worked on instrumentation for space missions at other wavelengths. In his later career, he worked on the design and operation of gravitational wave detectors.

Cruise held positions at the Mullard Space Science Laboratory, Rutherford Appleton Laboratory, and University of Birmingham. He was President of the Royal Astronomical Society from 2018 to 2020. In 2024, he received an OBE for services to space science.

== Early life and education ==
Cruise was born in South Wales on 12 May 1947. Raised in Southern England, he showed an early interest in electronics and radio astronomy, attempting to build a radio telescope at home at age 16.

Cruise obtained his BSc from University College London (UCL). His PhD was at UCL's Mullard Space Science Laboratory (MSSL), where he worked on instrumentation for X-ray astronomy under the supervision of Peter Willmore. His PhD thesis analysed X-ray observations collected during three Skylark launches (a sounding rocket); the doctorate was awarded in 1973.

== Career ==
Cruise remained at MSSL as a staff researcher; from 1985–1986 he briefly served as its Deputy Director. He then moved to the Rutherford Appleton Laboratory (RAL), initially as the head of its Astrophysics Group and later as its Associate Director for Space.

In 1995, he was appointed Professor of Astrophysics and Space Research at the University of Birmingham. He was head of department from 1997–2002 and Pro Vice-Chancellor for Research and Knowledge Transfer from 2002–2007. He formally retired from Birmingham in 2012 but remained an honorary professor (emeritus status).

== Research ==
Cruise developed spacecraft instrumentation, initially for X-ray astronomy, contributing to X-ray space telescopes including Ariel V, Ariel VI, ROSAT, XMM-Newton and Spektr-RG. He later worked on instruments for space telescopes at other wavelengths, particularly those of the European Space Agency (ESA), including Hipparcos, SOHO and STEREO. While at RAL, Cruise directed British contributions to the Cluster and JET-X missions. Cruise was one of four authors of the textbook Principles of Space Instrument Design.

In his later career, Cruise became involved in gravitational wave research, particularly gravitational wave detectors that could operate at high frequency. He proposed a new type of detector that would be sensitive to gravitational waves at MHz frequencies, and built several prototypes of such instruments in his laboratory at Birmingham. Cruise was part of the team that set the first experimental upper limits on gravitational waves at THz frequencies.

He was a member of the Laser Interferometer Gravitational-Wave Observatory (LIGO) collaboration, and helped to obtain grant funding for the UK's contribution to the Advanced LIGO instrument. His work led to UK involvement in the Laser Interferometer Space Antenna (LISA) mission and he helped design and build instruments on its precursor LISA Pathfinder.

== Community service ==
Cruise was heavily involved in the Royal Astronomical Society (RAS), serving as a council member, secretary, treasurer, vice president and was President of the RAS from 2018–2020. From 2003–2008, he was on the board of directors for the Thinktank, Birmingham science museum.

In 2011, as part of a collaboration with the Office of Astronomy for Development, Cruise assisted in the production of the first school astronomy textbook in the Pashto language, to support education in Afghanistan.

As of 2015, Cruise was the chair of ESA's Human Exploration Science Advisory Committee (HESAC), a committee providing scientific advice to the ESA on the European experiments carried out on the International Space Station.

Cruise chaired space policy committees in the STFC (such as the Aerospace Growth Partnership), the UK Space Agency and ESA.

Cruise was a member of the Voyage 2050 Senior Committee, a committee of scientists working in ESA member states' institutions appointed by the ESA Director of Science, tasked with delivering the final recommendation to the ESA Director of Science for the Voyage 2050 plan of the European Space Agency Science Programme. He was co-chair of the Science Redefinition Team of NewAthena from 2023–2024.

== Honours and recognition ==
Cruise received awards from NASA, ESA, the German Federal Ministry of Education and Research and the Royal Aeronautical Society.

In 2016, Cruise was one of approximately 1000 authors listed on the paper announcing the first observation of gravitational waves. All members of that team were jointly awarded the Breakthrough Prize in Fundamental Physics and the Gruber Prize in Cosmology later that year.

Cruise was appointed an Officer of the Order of the British Empire (OBE) in the 2024 New Year Honours for services to space sciences.

== Personal life ==
Cruise died on 7 February 2026, at the age of 78, following a long illness.
