= Brian Pilkington =

Brian Pilkington may refer to:

- Brian Pilkington (footballer) (1933–2020), English former football player
- Brian Pilkington (illustrator) (born 1950), English-Icelandic illustrator and artist
