= Robert Parr (disambiguation) =

Robert Parr (1921–2017) was an American theoretical chemist.

Robert Parr or Bob Parr may also refer to:

- Erle Stanley Gardner (1889–1970), author who wrote under this name
- Bob Parr (TV producer) (born 1957), English-born New Zealand producer
- Bob Parr, animated film character (also known as Mr. Incredible) from The Incredibles
- Robert Parr, song contributor to American band The Bottle Rockets
