= Shadow Force =

Shadow Force may refer to:

- Shadow Force (TV series), an American documentary television miniseries
- Shadow Force (1992 film), an American action film
- Shadow Force (2025 film), an American action thriller film
- Shadowforce, a supervillain team from Qward
