= Dark Zone =

Dark Zone may refer to:

- Dark Zone, a universe in the Lexx television series
- Dark Zone, a concept in the Futari wa Pretty Cure anime series
- The Dark Zone, the Quake map (DM6) setting of the 1996 film Diary of a Camper
- Dark Zones, concepts in the video game Tom Clancy's The Division
- "Dark Zone", an episode of the History Channel show Shadow Force
- Dark Zone, a 2011 novel by Yusuke Kishi
- In immunology, the proliferative compartment of the germinal center reaction
