= Fiammetta Wilson =

British astronomer (1864–1920)

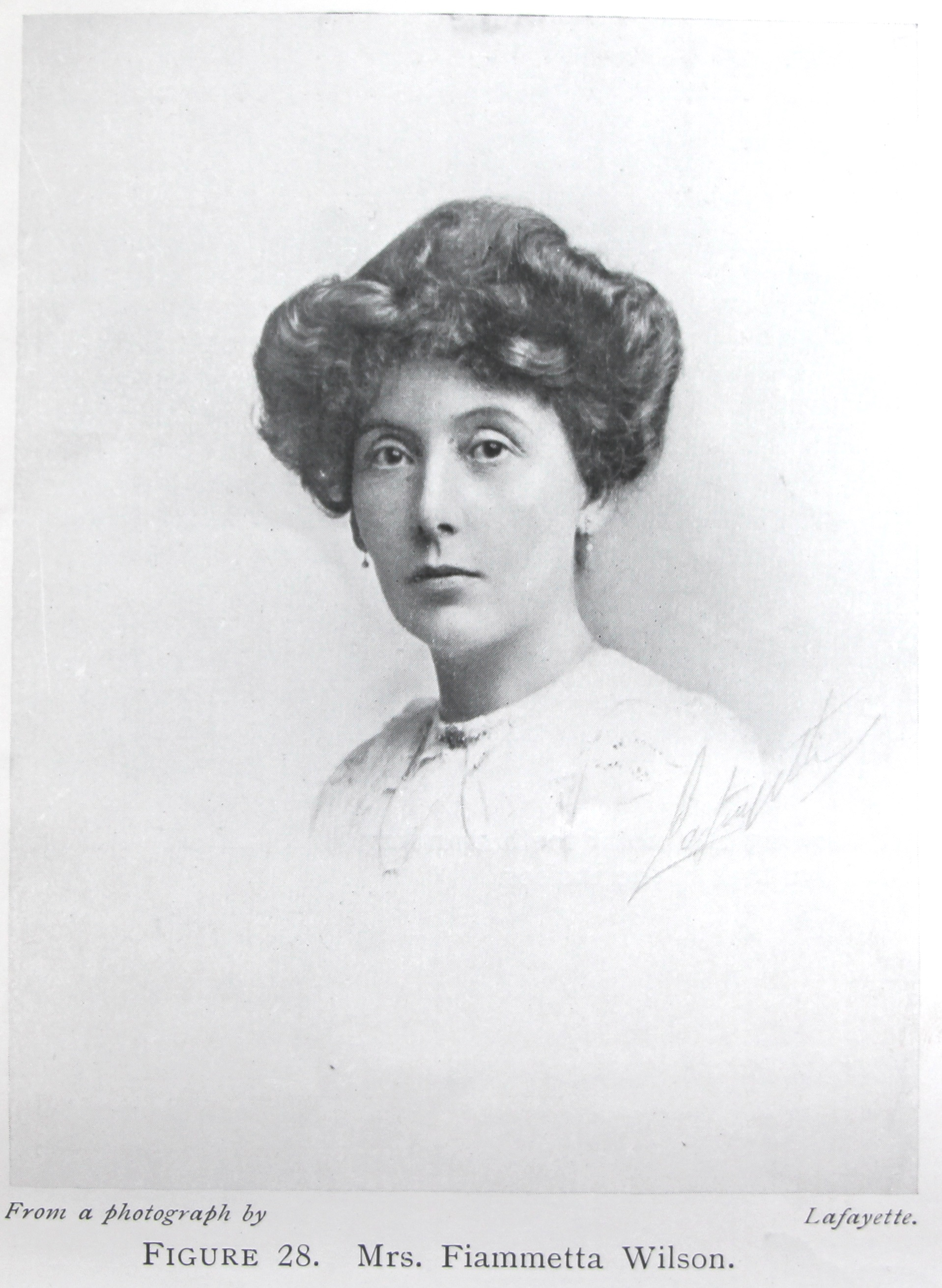
Portrait of Wilson from the Lafayette studio, 1915

Fiammetta Wilson FRAS (born Helen Frances Worthington; 19 July 1864 – 21 July 1920) was a British astronomer elected a fellow of the Royal Astronomical Society in 1916.

== Early life and education ==
Fiammetta Wilson was born Helen Frances Worthington on 19 July 1864 to Helen Felicite Worthington (nee Till; 1839–1922) and Francis Samuel Worthington (1837–1912) of Lowestoft, Suffolk. She had four younger siblings, two brothers and two sisters. Her father was a physician and a surgeon with a strong interest in the natural sciences. After he retired he spent time doing microscopical studies, and encouraged Fiammetta to study her natural surroundings. She was educated by governesses, went to schools in Germany and Switzerland, and was trained as a musician in Italy.

== Marriages and identity ==
On 29 October 1889, Helen Frances Worthington married Herbert William Webster (1864–1922) at St Gabriel's Church, Pimlico, London. Webster was a singer and music teacher in a family of clergymen. The couple separated, possibly around the summer of 1898.

From 1897 to at least 1916, Helen taught mandolin and was an orchestra conductor at the Guildhall School of Music. She excelled in conducting string orchestras and often wrote music as well.

As of 23 September 1901 she changed her name by deed poll to Fiammetta Waldahoff. Fiammetta means "little flame" in Italian, but her reasons for choosing the surname Waldahoff are completely unknown. She was variously described as Italian, Russian, or Polish, and gave a younger age.

On 2 February 1907, Helen initiated divorce proceedings, citing her husband's desertion and adultery as of 1898. A divorce decree final was granted on 21 October 1907, and both parties remarried within 4 months. On 29 February 1908, Helen married Sydney Arthur Wilson (1875–1925) at All Saints Church, St John's Wood, London.

== Career ==
After attending lectures by astrophysicist Alfred Fowler at the Imperial College of Science and Technology, London, she became interested in astronomy. She became so infatuated with astronomy that she gave up most of her music and withdrew from social life. She and her second husband, Sydney Arthur Wilson, were both elected members of the British Astronomical Association (BAA) on 23 February 1910. Between 1916 and 1919 with A. Grace Cook she was an acting director of its Meteor Section. As a member, she observed and published data on auroras, the zodiacal light, comets, and meteors.

Throughout her entire career, Wilson was incredibly hardworking and would even look at a cloudy sky for up to six hours at a time just to catch a glimpse of a meteor. To further her research and to make sure her information was accurate, she built a wooden platform in her garden so she could observe space without the obstruction of trees. Wilson faced copious hardships during her observations; she was threatened with arrest by a constable during World War I because he saw her using a flashlight for her research and thought that she was a German agent. She would also continue her observations even when zeppelins would drop bombs on her neighbourhood.

Between the years 1910 and 1920, Wilson observed about 10,000 meteors and accurately calculated the paths of 650 of them. In 1913, she made an independent recovery of Westphal's Comet while it was passing the Earth. After publishing many papers, she was elected a Fellow of the Royal Astronomical Society on 14 January 1916. She also became a member of both the Société astronomique de France and the Société d'astronomie d'Anvers. In July 1920 she was appointed to the E.C. Pickering Fellowship, a one-year research position at Harvard College, but died the same month without knowing she had been appointed.

== Other interests ==
Wilson enjoyed dancing and studying foreign languages such as Italian, French, and German. She loved animals, always kept a dog by her side, and was a very talented horsewoman. She was also an avid traveler and visited Canada and the United States after spending a year in Italy. Before she became interested in astronomy, she wrote numerous short stories that appeared in magazines.

== Publications ==
- Wilson, Fiammetta; Wilson, Sydney (April 1910). "Occultation of Mars". Journal of the British Astronomical Association. 20 (7): 382–383. Bibcode:1910JBAA...20..379.
- Wilson, Fiammetta (February 1911). "The Zodiacal Light". Journal of the British Astronomical Association. 21 (5): 241.
- Wilson, Fiammetta (May 1913). "Backhouse's Polar Star Map". Journal of the British Astronomical Association. 23 (8): 388–389. Bibcode:1913JBAA...23..380.
- Wilson, Fiammetta (May 1914). "The Zodiacal Light in 1914". Journal of the British Astronomical Association. 24 (8): 408–409. Bibcode:1914JBAA...24..391.
- Wilson, Fiammetta (February 1916). "Report of the Observing Sections: Meteor Section". Journal of the British Astronomical Association. 26 (5): 181–186. Bibcode:1916JBAA...26..181W.
- Wilson, Fiammetta; Cook, A Grace (June 1916). "Report of the Observing Sections: Meteor Section". Journal of the British Astronomical Association. 26 (8): 300–301. Bibcode:1916JBAA...26..300W.
- Wilson, Fiammetta; Cook, A Grace (October 1916). "Report of the Observing Sections: Meteor Section". Journal of the British Astronomical Association. 27 (1): 34. Bibcode:1916JBAA...27...34W.
- Wilson, Fiammetta (November 1916). "Clusters and Nebulae visible with Small Optical Means". Journal of the British Astronomical Association. 27 (2): 72–83. Bibcode:1916JBAA...27...72.
- Wilson, Fiammetta (1916). "Bolide remarquable a trainee lumineuse". L'Astronomie. 30: 70–71. Bibcode:1916LAstr..30...70W.
- Wilson, Fiammetta (1916). "Aurores Boreales et Activite Solaire". L'Astronomie. 30: 260–261. Bibcode:1916LAstr..30..257G.
- Wilson, Fiammetta (1917). "La Nuit Lumineuse du 23 au 24 Décembre 1916". L'Astronomie. 31: 29. Bibcode:1917LAstr..31...26T.
- Wilson, Fiammetta; Cook, A Grace (January 1917). "Reports of the Observing Sections: Meteor Section". Journal of the British Astronomical Association. 27 (3): 108–112. Bibcode:1917JBAA...27..108W.
- Wilson, Fiammetta; Cook, A Grace (April 1917). "Reports of the Observing Sections: Meteor Section". Journal of the British Astronomical Association. 27 (6): 186. Bibcode:1917JBAA...27..186W.
- Wilson, Fiammetta; Cook, A Grace (October 1917). "Reports of the Observing Sections: Meteor Section". Journal of the British Astronomical Association. 28 (1): 19–21. Bibcode:1917JBAA...28...19W.
- Wilson, Fiammetta; Denning, William F (January 1918). "The Meteoric Shower of January". Monthly Notices of the Royal Astronomical Society. 78 (3): 198–199. Bibcode:1918MNRAS..78..198D. doi:10.1093/mnras/78.3.198.
- Wilson, Fiammetta; Cook, A Grace (February 1918). "Reports of the Observing Sections: Interim Report of the Meteoric Section". Journal of the British Astronomical Association. 28 (4): 116–123. Bibcode:1918JBAA...28..116W.
- Wilson, Fiammetta (1918). "Observations Simultanees d'Etoiles Filantes". L'Astronomie. 32: 361–362. Bibcode:1918LAstr..32..361W.
- Wilson, Fiammetta; Cook, A Grace (1918). "Coopération interalliée en astronomie météorique". Journal des Observateurs. 2 (4): 41–42. Bibcode:1918JO......2...41W.
- Wilson, Fiammetta; Cook, A Grace (March 1918). "Meteoric Astronomy". The Observatory. 41: 127–129. Bibcode:1918Obs....41..127W.
- Wilson, Fiammetta; Cook, A Grace (October 1918). "Reports of the Observing Sections: Meteor Section". Journal of the British Astronomical Association. 29 (1): 19–24. Bibcode:1918JBAA...29...19W.
