= President of the Royal Astronomical Society =

- Incumbent; Jim Wild since 2026
- Royal Astronomical Society
- Member of: RAS Council
- Appointer: Elected by the Fellows of the RAS
- Term length: Two years
- Precursor: President of the Astronomical Society of London
- Formation: 1820
- First holder: Sir William Herschel
- Website: www.ras.org.uk/about-the-ras/council

The president of the Royal Astronomical Society (prior to 1831 known as President of the Astronomical Society of London) chairs the Council of the Royal Astronomical Society (RAS) and its formal meetings. They also liaise with government organisations (including the Department for Business, Innovation and Skills and the UK Research Councils), similar societies in other countries, and the International Astronomical Union on behalf of the UK astronomy and geophysics communities. Future presidents serve one year as President Elect before succeeding the previous president.

The first president was William Herschel in 1821, though he never chaired a meeting. Since then the post has been held by many distinguished astronomers. The post has generally had a term of office of two years, but some holders resigned after one year e.g. due to poor health. Francis Baily and George Airy were elected a record of four times each. Airy was additionally appointed by council for a partial term, so served as president a total of five times, more than anyone else. Since 1876 no-one has served for more than two years in total.

== Presidents ==
No.	Image	Name	Start year	End year	Note	Reference
1		William Herschel	1821	1823		
2		Henry Thomas Colebrooke	1823	1825		
3(a)		Francis Baily	1825	1827	First term	
4(a)		John Herschel	1827	1829	First term	
5		James South	1829	1831		
6		John Brinkley	1831	1833		
3(b)		Francis Baily	1833	1835	Second term	
7(a)		George Airy	1835	1837	First term	
3(c)		Francis Baily	1837	1839	Third term	
4(b)		John Herschel	1839	1841	Second term	
8		John Wrottesley	1841	1843		
3(d)		Francis Baily	1843	1844	Fourth term, died in office	
7(b)		George Airy	1844	1845	Second term, appointed by RAS Council to fill the vacancy left by Baily's death	
9		William Henry Smyth	1845	1847		
4(c)		John Herschel	1847	1849	Third term	
7(c)		George Airy	1849	1851	Third term	
10(a)		John Couch Adams	1851	1853	First term	
7(d)		George Airy	1853	1855	Fourth term	
11		Manuel John Johnson	1855	1857		
12		George Bishop	1857	1859		
13		Reverend Robert Main	1859	1861		
14		John Lee	1861	1863		
7(e)		George Airy	1863	1864	Fifth term, resigned after one year	
15		Warren De la Rue	1864	1866		
16		Charles Pritchard	1866	1868		
17		Russell Henry Manners	1868	1870		
18		William Lassell	1870	1872		
19		Arthur Cayley	1872	1874		
10(b)		John Couch Adams	1874	1876	Second term. Last president to serve for more than 2 years in total.	
20		William Huggins	1876	1878		
21		James Ludovic Lindsay	1878	1880		
22		John Russell Hind	1880	1882		
23		Edward Stone	1882	1884		
24		Edwin Dunkin	1884	1886		
25(a)		James Whitbread Lee Glaisher	1886	1888	First term	
26		William Christie	1888	1890		
27		James Francis Tennant	1890	1892		
28(a)		Edward Ball Knobel	1892	1893	First term	
29		William de Wiveleslie Abney	1893	1895		
30		Andrew Ainslie Common	1895	1897		
31		Robert Stawell Ball	1897	1899		
32		George Darwin	1899	1900		
28(b)		Edward Ball Knobel	1900	1901	Second term	
25(b)		James Whitbread Lee Glaisher	1901	1903	Second term	
33		Herbert Hall Turner	1903	1905		
34		William Maw	1905	1907		
35		Hugh Frank Newall	1907	1909		
36		David Gill	1909	1911		
37		Frank Watson Dyson	1911	1913		
38		Edmond Herbert Hills	1913	1915		
39		Ralph Allen Sampson	1915	1917		
40		Percy Alexander MacMahon	1917	1919		
41		Alfred Fowler	1919	1921		
42		Arthur Eddington	1921	1923		
43		John Louis Emil Dreyer	1923	1925		
44		James Jeans	1925	1927		
45		Theodore Evelyn Reece Phillips	1927	1929		
46		Andrew Claude De Lacherois Crommelin	1929	1931		
47		Harold Knox-Shaw	1931	1933		
48		Frederick John Marrian Stratton	1933	1935		
49		John Henry Reynolds	1935	1937		
50		Harold Spencer Jones	1937	1939		
51		Henry Crozier Keating Plummer	1939	1941		
52		Sydney Chapman	1941	1943		
53		Arthur Milne	1943	1945		
54		Harry Hemley Plaskett	1945	1947		
55		William Michael Herbert Greaves	1947	1949		
56		William Marshall Smart	1949	1951		
57		Herbert Dingle	1951	1953		
58		John Jackson	1953	1955		
59		Harold Jeffreys	1955	1957		
60		William Herbert Steavenson	1957	1959		
61		Roderick Oliver Redman	1959	1961		
62		William McCrea	1961	1963		
63		Richard van der Riet Woolley	1963	1965		
64		Thomas George Cowling	1965	1967		
65		Donald Sadler	1967	1969		
66		Bernard Lovell	1969	1971		
67		Fred Hoyle	1971	1973		
68		Donald Blackwell	1973	1975		
69		Francis Graham-Smith	1975	1977		
70		Alan Cook	1977	1979		
71		Michael Seaton	1979	1981		
72		Arnold Wolfendale	1981	1983		
73		Raymond Hide	1983	1985		
74		Donald Lynden-Bell	1985	1987		
75		Rod Davies	1987	1989		
76		Roger John Tayler	1989	1990	Astronomer: stellar evolution, galaxy evolution, plasma physics. Resigned his presidency a year early when he was diagnosed with myeloma.	
77		Kenneth Pounds	1990	1992	Space scientist, X-ray astronomer	
78		Martin Rees	1992	1994	Cosmologist, theoretical astrophysicist	
79		Carole Jordan	1994	1996	First female president Solar physicist, ultraviolet astronomer	
80		Malcolm Longair	1996	1998	High energy astronomer, cosmologist	
81		David A. Williams	1998	2000	Astrochemist	
82		Nigel Weiss	2000	2002	Theoretical astrophysicist	
83		Jocelyn Bell Burnell	2002	2004	Radio astronomer	
84		Kathryn Whaler	2004	2006	Earth geophysicist	
85		Michael Rowan-Robinson	2006	2008	Infrared astronomer	
86		Andrew Fabian	2008	2010	X-ray astronomer	
87		Roger Davies	2010	2012	Astronomer, physical cosmologist	
88		David Southwood	2012	2014	Space scientist, magnetospheres	
89		Martin Barstow	2014	2016	Astronomer: white dwarfs, interstellar medium, ultraviolet astronomy	
90		John Zarnecki	2016	2018	Space scientist, spacecraft instrumentation	
91		Mike Cruise	2018	2020	Astronomer, gravitational waves	
92		Emma Bunce	2020	2022	Space scientist, planetary magnetospheres	
93		Mike Edmunds	2022	2024	Astrophysicist Abundance of the chemical elements Cosmic dust	
94		Mike Lockwood	2024	2026	Solar-terrestrial physics	
95	Professor Jim Wild of Lancaster University	Jim Wild	2026	2028	Solar-terrestrial physics, space weather, planetary magnetospheres	
