= Jim Wild =

Jim Wild FRAS
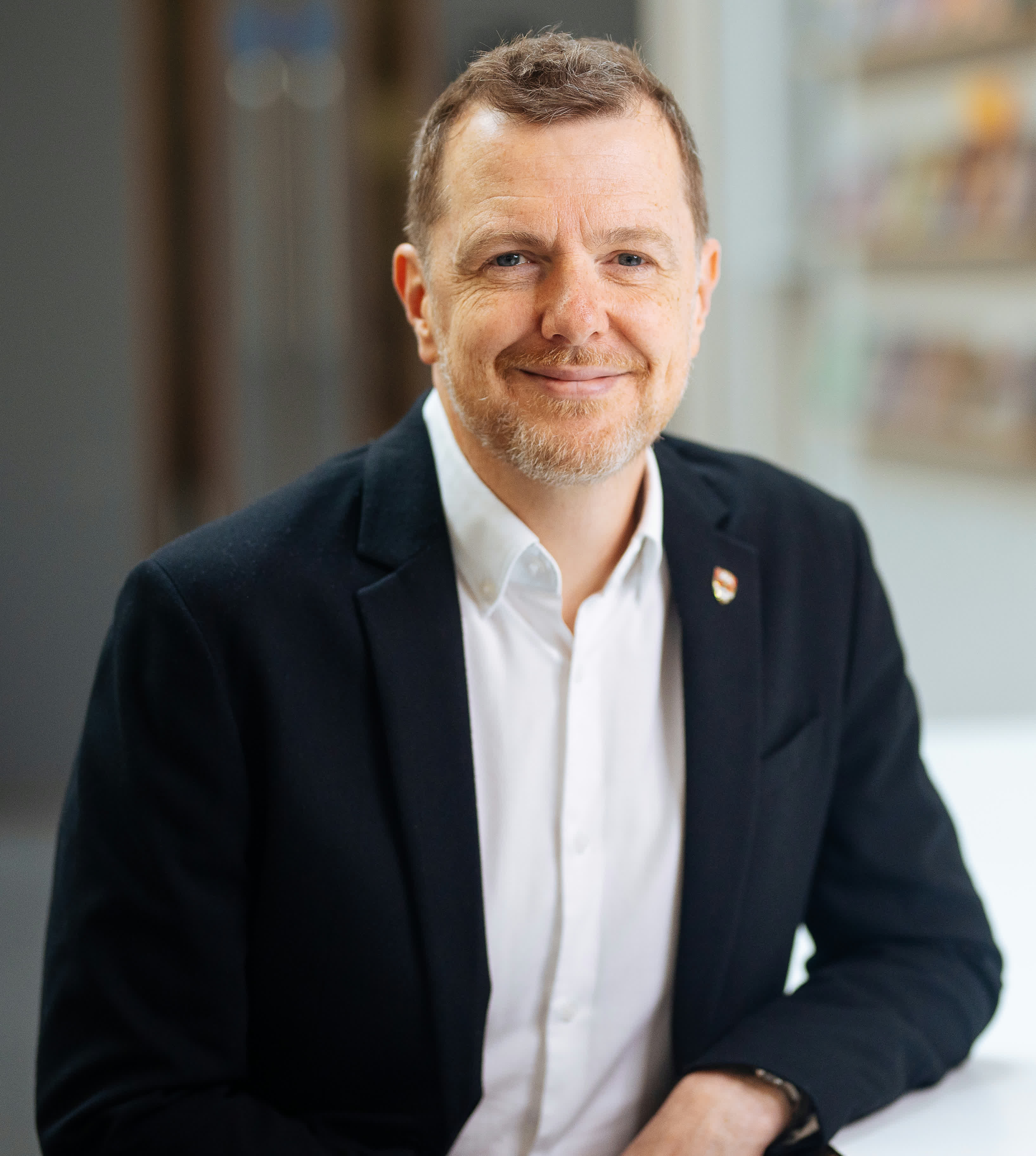
- Education: University of Leicester
- Occupation: Professor
- Employer: Lancaster University
- Organization: Royal Astronomical Society
- Website: jwild.co.uk

Jim Wild is a British professor of space physics at Lancaster University. He is also the 95th President of the Royal Astronomical Society.

== Early life and education ==
Jim Wild studied for his MPhys in Physics with Space Science and Technology at the University of Leicester from 1993 until 1997. Following this, Wild received his PhD from the University of Leicester in 2000. His thesis concerned electrodynamics of the auroral ionosphere during magnetospheric substorms.

== Academic and professional career ==
In 2005, Wild joined Lancaster University as a lecturer before becoming a professor of physics in 2013.

In 2018, Wild received the RAS James Dungey Lecture award.

In 2019, Wild became the associate dean for undergraduate education for the science and technology department at Lancaster University before becoming the Deputy Head of the Physics department in 2024.

In May 2025, Jim Wild was elected President of the Royal Astronomical Society. After serving a 12-month term as President-Elect, his two-year term as President began in May 2026. His role includes leading the general meetings, and representing the society to MPs, devolved bodies and Parliaments, think-tanks, and other societies and organisations.

Between 2020 and 2022, Wild was the Chair of the Science and Technology Facilities Council Consolidated Grant Implementation Panel, where Wild led a specialised and strategic review body to evaluate how consolidated grants were administered. This included reviewing the effectiveness of the scheme which provides funding for astronomy, nuclear physics, and solar system science.

== Research ==
Jim Wild's research concerns the physics behind aurora borealis (the northern lights), the impact of space weather on human technology, and the interaction between the atmosphere of Mars and the interplanetary environment. He runs the AuroraWatch UK website and app.

Wild has completed many research projects, including the impact of space weather on railway infrastructure and plasma events in the solar system.

== Personal life ==
Jim Wild is a fell and ultra-distance runner.
