= A. Grace Cook =

British astronomer

Alice Grace Cook FRAS (18 February 1877 - 27 May 1958), known as Grace Cook or A. Grace Cook was a British astronomer. Cook lived in Stowmarket, Suffolk. After she died she was remembered by her colleagues as a skilled and dedicated observer. In September 2021 it was announced that a new school in the town was to be named after Grace Cook. The school will be run by the Orwell Multi Academy Trust. In March 2023 minor planet 2000 EY_{156} was named Gracecook in her honour.

== Career ==
Grace Cook attended a series of lectures in astronomy given by Joseph Hardcastle in the autumn of 1909. Enthused she joined the British Astronomical Association on 22 February 1911 at the invitation of Hardcastle. Cook observed the 7 November 1914 transit of Mercury from her observatory. In January 1916 Cook was among the first group of women elected as Fellows of the Royal Astronomical Society. Her RAS election was proposed by W F Denning. With Joseph Alfred Hardcastle, Cook worked to identify and describe 785 New General Catalogue objects on the 206 plates of the John Franklin-Adams photographic survey. She was renowned for her work observing meteors, and also observed naked-eye phenomena including the zodiacal light and aurorae. During World War One Cook, with Fiammetta Wilson, temporarily headed the British Astronomical Association's Meteor Section. Cook observed comets and Milky Way novae and was among the first people to see V603 Aquilae, a nova discovered in June 1918. This work earned her the Edward C. Pickering Fellowship from the Maria Mitchell Association in 1920–1921. From 1921 to 1923 Cook was sole director of the British Astronomical Association's Meteor Section. On 30 May 1922 she attended the RAS Centenary celebrations held at Burlington House where she appears in the group photograph identified as number 16.

== Publications ==
- Cook, A Grace (October 1911). "Crepuscular Rays". Journal of the British Astronomical Association. 22 (1): 48. Bibcode:1911JBAA...22...38.
- Cook, A Grace (December 1913). "Extraordinary Meteor Display in 1876". Journal of the British Astronomical Association. 24 (3): 168. Bibcode:1913JBAA...24..165.
- Cook, A Grace (August 1914). "Light Rays in the Sky". The Observatory. 37 (477): 324–325. Bibcode:1914Obs....37..324C.
- Cook, A Grace (November 1914). "The 1914 Transit of Mercury". Journal of the British Astronomical Association. 25 (2): 84–85. Bibcode:1914JBAA...25...76.
- Cook, A Grace (March 1915). "Magnitudes of Meteors". The Observatory. 38 (485): 136–142. Bibcode:1915Obs....38..136C.
- Cook, A Grace (June 1915). "Meteor Reflections". Journal of the British Astronomical Association. 25 (8): 392–393. Bibcode:1915JBAA...25..389.
- Cook, A Grace (March 1916). "Twilight on Feb.3, 1916". Journal of the British Astronomical Association. 26 (6): 247.
- Cook, A Grace; Wilson, Fiammetta (June 1916). "Report of the Observing Sections: Meteor Section". Journal of the British Astronomical Association. 26 (8): 300–301. Bibcode:1916JBAA...26..300W.
- Cook, A Grace (June 1916). "An Anthelion". Journal of the British Astronomical Association. 26 (8): 309. Bibcode:1916JBAA...26..309.
- Cook, A Grace; Wilson, Fiammetta (October 1916). "Report of the Observing Sections: Meteor Section". Journal of the British Astronomical Association. 27 (1): 34. Bibcode:1916JBAA...27...34W.
- Cook, A Grace; Wilson, Fiammetta (January 1917). "Reports of the Observing Sections: Meteor Section". Journal of the British Astronomical Association. 27 (3): 108–112. Bibcode:1917JBAA...27..108W.
- Cook, A Grace; Wilson, Fiammetta (April 1917). "Reports of the Observing Sections: Meteor Section". Journal of the British Astronomical Association. 27 (6): 186. Bibcode:1917JBAA...27..186W.
- Cook, A Grace; Wilson, Fiammetta (October 1917). "Reports of the Observing Sections: Meteor Section". Journal of the British Astronomical Association. 28 (1): 19–21. Bibcode:1917JBAA...28...19W.
- Cook, A Grace; Blagg, Mary A (December 1917). "Appreciation of J A Hardcastle". Journal of the British Astronomical Association. 28 (2): 71. Bibcode:1917JBAA...28...70.
- Cook, A Grace; Wilson, Fiammetta (1918). "Coopération interalliée en astronomie météorique". Journal des Observateurs. 2 (4): 41–42. Bibcode:1918JO......2...41W.
- Cook, A Grace; Wilson, Fiammetta (February 1918). "Reports of the Observing Sections: Interim Report of the Meteoric Section". Journal of the British Astronomical Association. 28 (4): 116–123. Bibcode:1918JBAA...28..116W.
- Cook, A Grace; Wilson, Fiammetta (March 1918). "Meteoric Astronomy". The Observatory. 41 (524): 127–129. Bibcode:1918Obs....41..127W.
- Cook, A Grace (May 1918). "Lunar Rays". Journal of the British Astronomical Association. 28 (7): 228. Bibcode:1918JBAA...28..228.
- Cook, A Grace (June 1918). "Observations of Nova Aquilæ". Monthly Notices of the Royal Astronomical Society. 78: 569. Bibcode:1918MNRAS..78..569C. doi:10.1093/mnras/78.8.569.
- Cook, A Grace; Wilson, Fiammetta (October 1918). "Reports of the Observing Sections: Meteor Section". Journal of the British Astronomical Association. 29 (1): 19–24. Bibcode:1918JBAA...29...19W.
- Cook, A Grace (November 1920). "Two Sunsets; Nacreous Clouds and a Sun Pillar". Journal of the British Astronomical Association. 31 (2): 72–73. Bibcode:1920JBAA...31...69N.
- Cook, A Grace (1921). "Notes on the Meteor Showers of October and November". Popular Astronomy. 29: 67–68. Bibcode:1921PA.....29...66C.
- Cook, A Grace (February 1921). "Luminous Night Skies and Clouds: Terrestrial Ice Crystals a Possible Cause". The Observatory. 44 (561): 50–52. Bibcode:1921Obs....44...50C.
- Cook, A Grace (November 1921). "Elliptical Haloes". The Observatory. 44 (570): 334–335. Bibcode:1921Obs....44..334C.
- Cook, A Grace (January 1922). "Director of the Meteor Section". Journal of the British Astronomical Association. 32 (4): 128–131. Bibcode:1922JBAA...32..128C.
- Cook, A Grace; Prentice, J P M (February 1922). "Notes on Unusual Haloes". The Observatory. 45 (573): 47–51. Bibcode:1922Obs....45...47C.
- Cook, A Grace; Prentice, J P M (March 1922). "Observations of the Meteors of the ε Arietid Radiant in 1921". Monthly Notices of the Royal Astronomical Society. 82: 309. Bibcode:1922MNRAS..82..309C. doi:10.1093/mnras/82.5.309.
- Cook, A Grace (February 1923). "The Radiant of the Orionids". The Observatory. 46 (585): 49–51. Bibcode:1923Obs....46...49C.
- Cook, A Grace (March 1923). "Observational Methods for Meteor Observers". Journal of the British Astronomical Association. 33 (6): 235–237. Bibcode:1923JBAA...33..235C.
- Cook, A Grace (1924). "Section for the Observation of Meteors. Report of the Section, 1922". Memoirs of the British Astronomical Association. 24: 49–82. Bibcode:1924MmBAA..24...49.
- Cook, A Grace (May 1926). "The Earth's Shadow". Journal of the British Astronomical Association. 36 (7): 260. Bibcode:1926JBAA...36..252.
- Cook, A Grace (May 1932). "An Interesting Old Book". Journal of the British Astronomical Association. 42 (7): 264. Bibcode:1932JBAA...42..261.
