= Brian Pilkington (illustrator) =

English-born Icelandic illustrator and artist

- Born: 20 July 1950 (age 76); Liverpool, England, U.K.
- Education: University of Leicester
- Occupation: Illustrator

Brian Charles Pilkington (born 20 July 1950) is an English-born Icelandic illustrator, known for his illustrations of many Icelandic children's books since the 1980s. Pilkington has also illustrated other literature genres, including his own book of Icelandic fauna (Dýraríki Íslands (1992)).

== Early life and education ==
Pilkington was born and raised in Liverpool, England, and graduated from the School of Arts of the University of Leicester.

== Career ==
He moved to Iceland in 1974 where he soon found work in the advertising industry there. His first notable illustration work came about in 1981 when he was commissioned by the Icelandic writer Guðrún Helgadóttir to illustrate her children's book Ástarsaga úr fjöllunum.

=== Accolades ===
Pilkington has received several accolades for his work. In 1999, his book Allt um tröll (released in English as Icelandic Trolls) was recognised by the Icelandic Tourism Board as the best idea for a souvenir from Iceland. He has also received the Dimmalimm award for the book Mánasteina í vasanum and was nominated for the Reykjavík Children's Book Prize for his book Jólakötturinn tekinn í gegn.

== List of illustrations (incomplete) ==
- Ástarsaga úr fjöllunum (A Love Story from the Mountains, 1981) – written by Guðrún Helgadóttir
- Bakkabræður (The Brothers from Bakki, 1989)
- Á baðkari til Betlehem (On a Bathtub to Bethlehem, 1990) – novella written by Sigurður G. Valgeirsson and Sveinbjörn I. Baldvinsson, based on the television series of the same name
- Jóladýrin – written by Gerður Kristný
- Blómin á þakinu – written by Ingibjörg Sigurðardóttir
- Jólin okkar
- Konungur háloftanna
- Mánasteinar í vasanum

== See also ==
- List of British artists
- List of Icelandic artists
- List of illustrators
- List of people from Merseyside
- List of University of Leicester people
