= Martin Barstow =

British academic

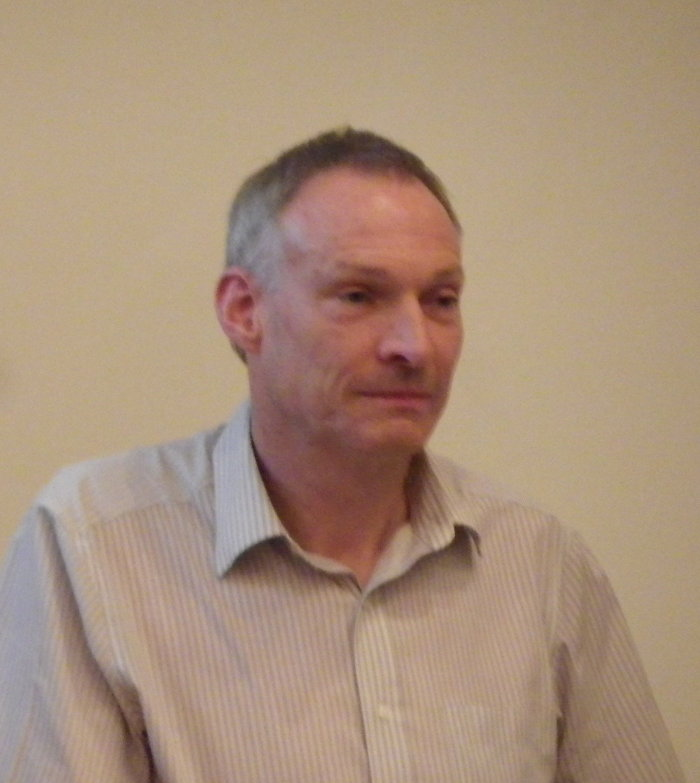
- Barstow presiding at the April 2015 meeting of the Royal Astronomical Society
- Education: York University (BA); University of Leicester (PhD)
- Known for: President of the Royal Astronomical Society
- Scientific career
- Fields: Astronomy, space science
- Workplaces: University of Leicester, Royal Astronomical Society

Martin Barstow is a Professor of Astrophysics and Space Science at the Department of Physics and Astronomy at the University of Leicester and the former President of the Royal Astronomical Society.

== Research ==
Barstow's research is on white dwarfs, the interstellar medium and UV instrumentation.

== Royal Astronomical Society ==
Having been a Councillor and Secretary for the Royal Astronomical Society between 2005 and 2013, he was elected to be the 89th President of the Royal Astronomical Society in 2013. After a year as President Elect he assumed the position of President in May 2014.
