= Lyman Andrews =

American poet (1938–2009)

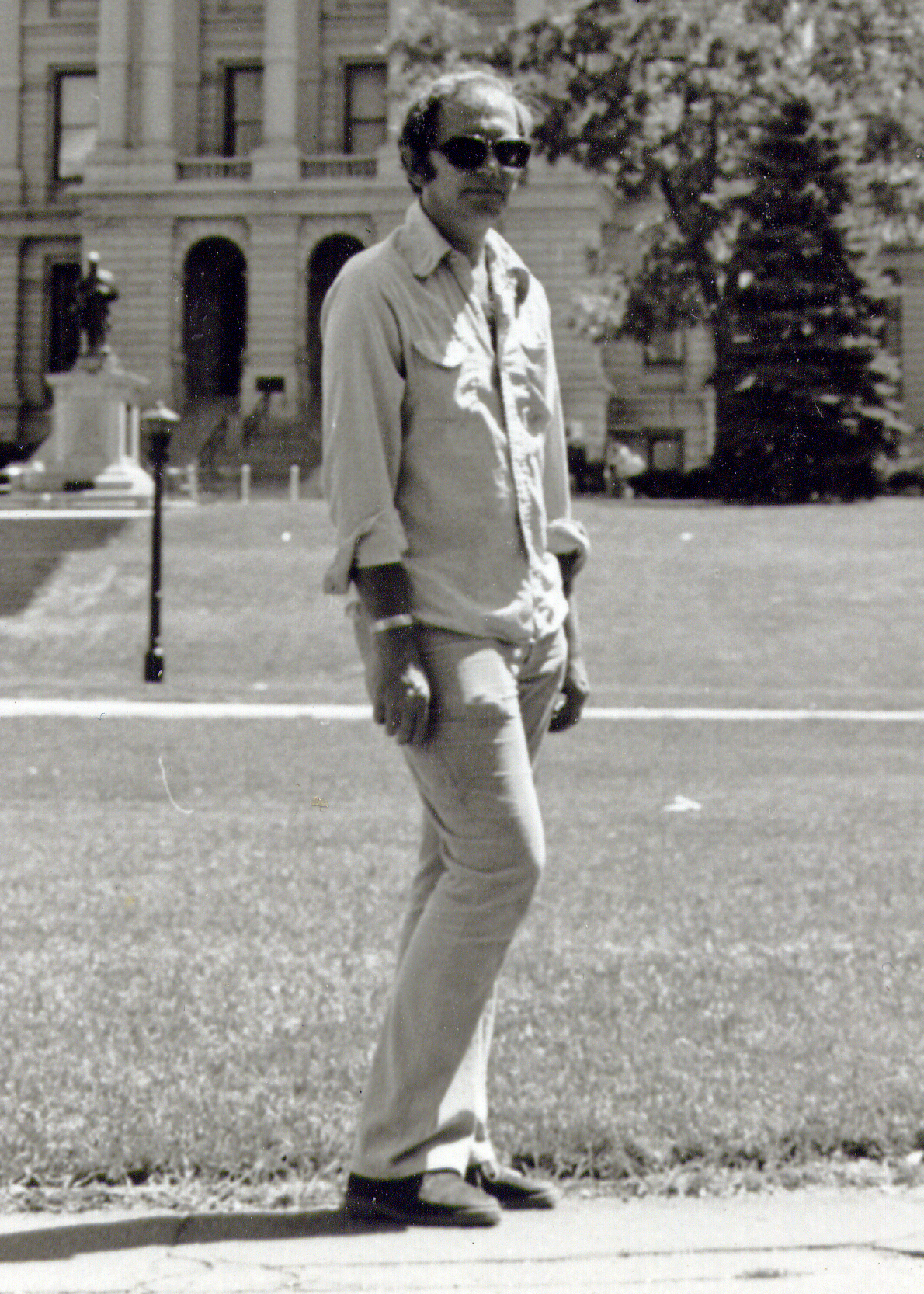
- Lyman Andrews in 1979, by Michael Baird
- Born: Lyman Henry Andrews; April 2, 1938; Denver, Colorado
- Died: February 13, 2009 (aged 70); Nottingham, England
- Education: Brandeis University; University of California, Berkeley; King's College London
- Writing career
- Notable works: Ash Flowers (1958); Fugitive Visions (1962); Kaleidoscope (1973)
- Notable awards: Fulbright Fellowship; James Phelan Fellowship; Woodrow Wilson Fellowship

Lyman Henry Andrews (April 2, 1938 – February 13, 2009) was an American poet, literary critic and friend of Allen Ginsberg and Robert Lowell, amongst other writers with whom he maintained a lifelong contact. Based since the early 1960s in the United Kingdom, he was acquainted with writers and poets such as William S. Burroughs, Mohamed Choukri, W.H. Auden, Brian Patten, Ted Hughes and Pete Brown.

== Life ==
Andrews was born on April 2, 1938, in Denver, which he later portrayed in The Times as "the sort of city many Americans would like their home-town to be", although he regarded it as having a mediocre cultural life. He studied English at Brandeis University – where he was taught by Lowell, Philip Rahv, Claude Vigée and Pierre Emmanuel – and graduated with a BA in 1960. He then embarked on postgraduate work at the University of California, Berkeley, where he received a Fulbright grant to conduct research overseas at King's College London.

In 1964 Andrews took up a post as Assistant Lecturer in English at the University College of Swansea (now Swansea University). The following year he became a Lecturer in American Studies at the University of Leicester, remaining in situ (and leading a somewhat "colourful" life) until he took early retirement in 1988. During that time he wrote several reviews and articles for leading publications, and from 1969 to 1978 he was the poetry critic for The Sunday Times.

Andrews also occasionally intervened in political matters, signing a declaration in 1967 urging Harold Wilson's Labour Government to withdraw its support for United States policy in Vietnam. That same year, he was a defence witness for John Calder and Marion Boyars (his publishers) during the trial brought against them by the Crown for the publication of Last Exit to Brooklyn by Hubert Selby. It was at the celebratory party afterwards that he first met Burroughs – initially mistaking him for a waiter, as the latter was dressed in dark suit and tie.

He had four volumes of poetry published during his lifetime, beginning with Ash Flowers in 1958 (completed whilst still an undergraduate), and followed by Fugitive Visions (1962), The Death of Mayakovsky (1968) and Kaleidoscope (1973). His manuscript of Kaleidoscope is at Indiana University, where he was a Visiting Professor from 1978 to 1979.

Andrews lived his final years as a recluse in Nottingham, and died there on February 13, 2009. He left a major work, "Hometown (The Denver Poem)", 57 parts long. He worked on this magnum opus for over thirty years, completing it in 2007. This work was finally published posthumously by Alma Books in October 2025, in a volume of the complete works of Lyman Andrews called Hometown and Other Poems.

== Awards ==
- Fulbright Fellowship
- James Phelan Fellowship
- Woodrow Wilson Fellowship

== Bibliography ==
- Lyman Andrews, Ash Flowers: First Poems (Baltimore, MD: Contemporary Poetry, 1958).
- Lyman Andrews, Fugitive Visions (Oakland, CA: White Rabbit, 1962).
- Lyman Andrews, "The Death of Mayakovsky", in New Writers, vol. 8 (London: Calder and Boyars, 1968).
- Lyman Andrews, F. W. Willetts and Christine Bowler, Red Dust 1: new writing, (New York, NY: Red Dust, 1970). ISBN 978-0-87376-017-1
- Lyman Andrews, Kaleidoscope (London: Calder and Boyars, 1973). ISBN 978-0-7145-1024-8
- Lyman Andrews, Hometown and Other Poems (London: Alma Books, 2025). ISBN 978-0-7145-5097-8
