= Ali A. F. Al-Furaih =

Saudi Arabian writer and academic

Ph.D Ali A.F. AL-Furaih was a geology professor at King Saud University. Born in Bukayriyah, Saudi Arabia.

== Academic qualifications ==
- B. Sc. in geology with grade excellent and first class of distinction, King Saud University, Riyadh, June 1971
- Ph.D. in geology, University of Leicester, England, July 1977

== Academic career ==
- Professor of geology, King Saud University 1985–2010
- Associate professor, King Saud University 1980–1985
- Adjunct associate scientist, University of Kansas, 1982–1983
- Assistant professor, King Saud University 1977–1980

== Administrative work ==
- Dean of graduate college, King Saud University (1995–1998)
- Member of the editorial board of Journal of Faculty of Science, King Saud University
- Chairman of Seismological-Geophysical Observatory, King Saud University (1991–1995)
- Chairman of Geology Department, Faculty of Science, King Saud University (1986–1988)
- Vice dean of Centre for University Women Students, King Saud University (1980–1983)

== Membership of councils ==
- Member of King Saud University Council (1995–1998)
- Member of the Academic Council (1985–1992)
- Member of College of Science Council (1979–1980) and (1986–1988)
- Member of Earth Science Society Council (1988–1991)
- Member of the University Co-operative Society Council (1987–1992)
- Chairman or member of several committee at King Saud University
- Representative of King Saud University at several Saudi Arabian Organizations

== List of publications ==
- Al-Furaih, A.A.F., (1975) – On Hornibrookella anna (Lienenkaus), A Stereo-Atlas of Ostracod Shells, vol. 2, pt. 3, p 211-214, London.
- Al-Furaih, A.A.F., (1975) – On Paragrenocythere biclavata Al-Furaih gen. et sp. nov. A Stereo-Atlas of Ostracod Shells, vol.2 pt. 4, p. 231-238, London.
- Al-Furaih, A.A.F., (1977) – Cretaceous and Palaeocene species of the Ostracod Hornibrookella from Saudi Arabia. Palaeontology, vol.20, pt.3, p. 483-502, pl. 53-58, London.
- Al-Furaih, A.A.F., (1980) – Upper Cretaceous and Lower Tertiary Ostracoda (Superfamily CYTHERACEA) from Saudi Arabia, 211 p., 65 pl., publication of University Libraries, University of Riyadh, Riyadh.
- Al-Furaih, A.A.F. and Siddiqui, Q.A., (1981) – The Ostracod Genus Ananmatocythere from the Middle Eocene of Pakistan and Saudi Arabia, Bulletin of College of Science, Riyadh Univer., vol. 12, no. 2, p. 429-441, 2 pl., 2 fig, Riyadh.
- Siddiqui, Q.A. and Al-Furaih, A.A.F., (1981) – Schizoptocythere, A distinctive New Ostracode Genus from the Early Tertiary of Western Asia, Palaeontology vol. 24, pt. 4, p. 877-890, pl. 123–126, London.
- Al-Furaih, A.A.F., (1983) – Palaeocene and Lower Eocene Ostracoda from the Ummer Radhuma Formation of Saudi Arabia. The University of Kansas Palaeontological Contributions, no. 107, 10 p., 3 pl., 1 fig., 1 table, Kansas.
- Al-Furaih, A.A.F., (1983) – Middle Cretaceous (Cenomanian) Ostracoda from the Wasia Formation of Saudi Arabia, The University of Kansas Palaeontological Contributions, no. 108, 6 p., 1 pl., 1 fig, Kansas.
- Al-Furaih, A.A.F., (1983) – A new species of Phalcocythere (Ostracoda) from the Lower Palaeocene of Saudi Arabia. Journal of College of Science, King Saud University, vol. 14, no. 1, p. 157–162, 1 pl., 1 fig, Riyadh.
- Al-Furaih, A.A.F., (1984) – Maastrichtian Ostracode from the Aruma Formation of Saudi Arabia. Revue de Micropaleontologie, vol. 27, pt. 3, p. 159–170, 1 fig., 3 pls, Paris.
- Al-Furaih, A.A.F., (1984) – Maastrichtian and Palaeocene species of the Ostracod genus Foveolebris from Saudi Arabia. Revista Espagnola de Micropaleontologia, vol. 16, no. 2, p. 161–169, 1 fig., 2 pls, Madrid.
- Al-Furaih, A.A.F., (1984) – Maastrichtian Ostracodes from Wadi al-Atj, Saudi Arabia. Arab Gulf Journal of Scientific Research, vol. 2, no. 2, p. 495-503, 1 fig., 2pls, Riyadh.
- Al-Furaih, A.A.F., (1984) – On Loxoconcha multiornata Bate&Gurney, A Stereo-Atlas of Ostracod Shells vol. 11, pt. 2, p. 99–102, London.
- Al-Furaih, A.A.F., (1984) – On Loxoconcha undulata Al-Furaih sp. nov., A Stereo-Atlas of Ostracod Shells vol. 11, pt. 2, p. 103–106, London.
- Al-Furaih, A.A.F., (1984) – On Loxoconcha amygdalanux Bate & Gurney, A Stereo-Atlas of Ostracod Shells vol. 11, pt. 2, p. 107–110, London.
- Al-Furaih, A.A.F., (1985) – The Ostracod genus Brachycythere from the UpperCretaceous of Saudi Arabia, Revista Espanola de Micropaleontologia, vol. 17, no. 1, p. 113–122, Madrid.
- Al-Furaih, A.A.F., (1986) – Kaesleria A new Ostracode genus from the Aruma Formation (Upper Cretaceous of Saudi Arabia), Journal of Paleontology, vol. 60, pt. 5, p. 701-720, 5 figs, Tulsa, Oklahoma.
- Al-Furaih, A.A.F., (1988) (ed.) – Proceedings of the Third Arab Symposium on Earthquake Seismology, publication of Geophysical-Seismological Observatory, King Saud University, Riyadh
- Al-Furaih, A.A.F., (1986) – Biostratigraphy of the Upper Cretaceous and Lower Tertiary of Saudi Arabia, 11th Intr. Sym. Ost., Melbourne, Australia.
- Al-Furaih, A.A.F., (1994) – On Carinocythereis batei, A Stereo-Atlas of Ostracod Shells, vol.21, pt.2, p. 71-74, London.

== University textbooks ==
- Al-Furaih, A.A.F., (2000): "Principales of Micropaleontology" Published by King Saud University press, Riyadh, 544p.
- Al-Furaih, A.A.F., (2007): "Paleontological laboratory manual" Published by King Saud University press, Riyadh, 393p.

== Current research ==
- Jurassic Ostracodes.
- Stratigraphical and Environmental Studies on Hanifa Formation (Jurassic) of Saudi Arabia.
- Recent Marine Ostracodes from the Persian Gulf and Red Sea.
- Biostratigraphical studies on Aruma Formation of Saudi Arabia.
