= Ken Pounds =

British physicist

Kenneth Alwyne Pounds, CBE, FRS (born 17 November 1934) is Emeritus Professor of physics at the University of Leicester.

== Early life ==
He was born in Bradford, Yorkshire, where he went to Salt Grammar School (now Titus Salt School in Baildon). He then attended University College London where he gained his BSc and in 1961 a PhD under the supervision of Harrie Massey and Robert Lewis Fullarton Boyd.

== Career ==
He then moved to the University of Leicester as Assistant Lecturer in 1960, to work in the Department of Physics (now the School of Physics and Astronomy). He became Deputy Director of Space Research in 1967, and was one of the pioneers of using rockets and satellites for research in the UK. He became first Director of the X-ray Astronomy group in 1974. His research is in the area of active galaxies, and one of his many discoveries is that black holes are common in the universe.

Ken Pounds became Professor of Space Physics in 1973. He was appointed Head of the Department of Physics in 1986, and the following year took the decision to merge with the Astronomy department to create the present Department of Physics and Astronomy.

He was a member of the Science and Engineering Research Council, 1980–1984; President of the Royal Astronomical Society, 1990–1992; and was seconded as the first Chief Executive of the newly formed Particle Physics and Astronomy Research Council, 1994–1998, following the restructuring of the Research Councils. He then returned to Leicester as Head of Department until his retirement in 2002. He remains active in the Department as a research fellow.

== Awards and honours ==
Pounds was elected a Fellow of the Royal Society in 1981, and appointed a CBE in 1984. He holds five honorary doctorates, including the rare distinction of an honorary degree from his own institution, the University of Leicester, in 2005. The asteroid 4281 Pounds, discovered by Edward Bowell in 1985, was named in his honour. The official naming citation was published by the Minor Planet Center on 4 October 1990 (M.P.C. 17030). In 2010, the National Portrait Gallery, London purchased a portrait of Pounds by the photographer Max Alexander for its permanent collection.
