= Shadow Force (TV series) =

2008 television documentary miniseries

- Genre: Documentary
- Country of origin: United States
- Original language: English
- No. of episodes: 8

Original release
- Release: November 7 – December 26, 2008

Shadow Force is a documentary television miniseries that aired on the History Channel in 2008. It follows a team of real-life mercenaries doing contracts given to them by the countries of Liberia, Kenya, and the Congo. The team consists mostly of ex-Special Forces from various countries.

== The team ==
- Bob Parr - the team's leader. He's a counter-terrorism consultant and former member of the United Kingdom Special Forces and Royal Marine Commandos. Appeared in episodes Deep Water, Ivory Tracker, Black Gold, Ghost Ship, Dark Zone, Gorilla War and Last Chance.
- Glenn - The team's technical and tactical specialist. He's a former member of the U.S. Special Forces, as well as an Army Ranger. Appeared in episodes Deep Water, Ivory Tracker, Black Gold, Ghost Ship, Gorilla War, Last Chance and Dark Zone.
- Cobus Claassens - A former member of the South African Army and a leading figure in the mercenary company Executive Outcomes. He is an expert in the West Africa region with 20+ years of experience. Leonardo DiCaprio's character in the film Blood Diamond (2006) was inspired by Claassens. Claassens also appeared as an interviewee in the 2006 documentary Shadow Company. Appeared in episodes: Deep Water, Ghost Ship and Dark Zone.
- Stuart Yorkston - The team's newest recruit and trained by SCS.
- Laura Engelbrecht - She is a former diplomat and Central African specialist. She is a former staff member of the U.S. State Department, where she specialized in operations intelligence and diplomacy. Appeared in episodes Deep Water, Black Gold, Ghost Ship, Dark Zone, Gorilla War and Last Chance.
- Ralph - The team's tracking and electronics expert with over 30 years of experience in the military, Government and commercial security sectors. Appeared in the episode Ivory Tracker.
- Rhidian Bridge - A former Royal Marines officer and maritime specialist who joins the team for specific missions.

== Episodes ==
New episodes aired every Friday at 10pm/9c on the History Channel. All episodes have now aired.

=== Deep Water ===
Aired on November 14, 2008

The team consisted of Cobus Claassens, Bob Parr, Laura Engelbrecht, Slim, and two fishing officials. The missions objective was to stop illegal fishing on the coast of Liberia. Before heading out to look for ships performing illegal activities, the team performs various boarding practices. While searching for ships illegally fishing, the team runs out of water so Cobus goes to a U.N. base asking for water. At first, the U.N. officials don't want to give him water. After a while, they agree to but the truck with the water broke down. Cobus is forced to get back on the hunt and use beer as a replacement for water. They find a vessel carrying out an illegal fishing operation late at night. Cobus, sLiM, and Bob board the ship without any weapons. Fortunately, the captain is cooperative and does as instructed.

=== Ivory Tracker ===
Aired on November 21, 2008

The team consisted of Bob Parr, Slim, and Ralph. The missions objective was to supply LEWA security personnel with technology that will allow them to track illegal/poached elephant tusks and rhinoceros horns. The team first meets with LEWA's Head of Security and some other people to research their current techniques and technologies. After a bit of talking, Bob calls in a friend of his that's an expert in tracking and electronics (Ralph). Afterwards, they do a test with the current technology used. They prove it to be highly dangerous. Ralph then introduces his equipment to Bob Parr and LEWA's Head of Security. They make a trap: Ralph places a movement-sensitive camera (starts recording whenever it senses movement) in a hidden location, and he places a fake Rhino horn with a tracker inside it. LEWA's H.o.S. then sends a trusted man of his to pick it up. Ralph, and the team, track the horn and prove to LEWA's H.o.S. that the technology works, is accurate and reliable. Late at night, they do a practice raid to retake the fake Rhino horn, which goes as planned.

=== Black Gold ===
Aired on November 28, 2008

The team consisted of Bob Parr, Slim, and Laura Engelbrecht. The missions objective was to aid ICCN Park Rangers in stopping rebel forces hiding in the jungle from cutting down trees to produce charcoal. Bob, sLiM, and Laura head out to ICCN Headquarters to meet the ICCN Director and the Park Rangers. They are told that it is extremely dangerous to enter the jungle, the rebel forces consist of an estimated 10,000 members and are responsible for over 800,000 deaths, the illegal cutting down of trees reduces the habitat for the endangered mountain gorilla, and the charcoal cut down from this forest produces $30,000,000 USD for the rebel forces yearly. They are also informed that the ICCN has two roadblocks. Bob and sLiM then head out to one of the road blocks to observe their current method. Bob and sLiM notice that the roadblock is way too close to a village and could endanger the lives of innocent bystanders if there is a shootout between the rebel forces and the ICCN Park Rangers. They also notice that there is virtually nothing, except the Park Rangers, stopping the trucks and cars from passing through. One of the Park Rangers is asked about the location and why it was chosen, he said because it was close to headquarters. At night, Bob observes the roadblock with an infrared camera since it is pitch-black. He sees several problems with the roadblock at night, the most dangerous one is that the ICCN Park Rangers have very little visibility at night. The next day, Bob and sLiM first go with ICCN Park Rangers to observe what they do once a kiln is found. Bob and Slim then ask the ICCN if they could go into the jungle. At first, the ICCN doesn't want to because it is extremely dangerous but after some time, they agree to with the condition that Bob, Slim, and Laura are at the end. A kiln is eventually found. In the process, Bob noticed that the rangers make too much noise which could alert the rebel forces and that the troops don't take as much precaution as they should.

The next day, Laura, Bob, and Slim head to a nearby town to buy supplies for a new roadblock within the boundaries of the park that give the ICCN Park Rangers legal authority. They then head to the location and set up the equipment. In the process, the Congo Army shows and orders them to shut down. They do and briefly after Laura calls up their General and they are now back to work. After some time, a car speeds through their roadblock but doesn't make it far because the wire stopped it. The driver is questioned but says that he got scared when he saw men with guns. Although he was not a charcoal transporter, it proved that the roadblock worked perfectly.

=== Ghost Ship ===
Aired on December 5, 2008

The team consisted of Bob Parr, Slim, Cobus Claassens, and Laura Engelbrecht. The mission objective was to intercept and determine the nature and intentions of the Takamar 6, a mysterious fishing trawler that had been anchored just off shore of the U.S. Embassy in Liberia. The United States and Liberian governments were growing increasingly concerned about the Takamar's intentions due to the expected arrival of United States President George W. Bush in the coming weeks. Without a formal Navy or assets to do an official maritime intercept, the Liberian government called on Cobus, Slim, Laura and Bob off of their fishing vessel piracy missions to deal with the threatening nature of the Takamar 6. The team immediately mobilizes to begin surveillance of the Takamar 6 by utilizing a local contact to get them into position on the rooftop of an abandoned hotel that was reportedly guarded by Nigerian Army officials, due to abandoned hotels being hotspots for drug trafficking and other criminal activity. Upon arrival at the hotel, Slim uses the FLIR device to determine that there are several individuals around the hotel that do not look like Nigerian Army officials. But after Cobus confirms with his local contact that the spot is legitimate, the team manages to meet up with a Nigerian soldier who agrees to get them to the rooftop of the abandoned hotel so that they can get a good view of the Liberian coastline. Upon their rooftop arrival, Cobus confirms that the Takamar 6 is anchored offshore and the FLIR picks up the heat signature that proves that there is activity on board. The team formulates a plan to do a surveillance mission out in the waters near the Takamar 6, but once out to sea, they realize that the Takamar 6 has mysteriously and conveniently disappeared leading Cobus to believe that their mission may have been leaked by someone on the inside.

The next evening, the team heads south of Monrovia to a river mouth known for local fisherman to try to enlist the help of locals to spot the Takamar 6. After some contact with the locals and earning their trust, they inform Cobus that there has indeed been a strange vessel moving up and down the shorelines. Two days later Cobus receives a call that a local has spotted what appears to be the Takamar 6 near the port of Buchanan. The team immediately mobilizes in their rigid inflatable boat, intercepts and boards the Takamar 6 to find a very uncooperative Captain who does not follow Cobus's orders to return the ship to the port. Finally, after Cobus's firm conveyance that he was to steer the Takamar 6 to the port of Buchanan, the Captain followed orders and took the boat to the port, where Liberian authorities were waiting to arrest the Captain and crew.

=== Dark Zone ===
Aired on December 12, 2008

"The team helps combat tribal wars while in Kenya" (TV Rage).

=== Gorilla War ===
Aired on December 19, 2008

"The team heads to the Congo to assist the park rangers in a battle against gorilla poachers by using new technology which can track the gorilla population, and how call for help when a poacher is encountered." (TV Rage)

=== Last Chance ===
Aired on December 26, 2008

"While in the Congo, the team will assist a unit of the Congolese Army, to help keep a refugee camp safe from rebel attacks." (TV Rage)

== See also ==
- Private military company
