= Bob Parr (TV producer) =

British television producer

Bob Parr MBE
- Born: Robert Michael Parr; 25 June 1957 (age 68); London, England
- Occupations: TV producer, private security contractor
- Notable credit(s): Shadow Force (History Channel); The Amazing Race (CBS); Jungle Gold (Discovery Channel); America's Next Top Model (The CW)
- Spouse: Nicola
- Website: www.so3projects.com

Robert Michael Parr MBE (born 25 June 1957) is a private security contractor best known for his role as team leader and executive producer of Shadow Force on the History Channel. Parr has also won six Primetime Emmy Awards for his work as a security advisor with The Amazing Race, and is a self-published novelist.

== Biography ==
Born in London, England, Parr started his career in the British Armed Forces where he spent 25 years before retiring in late 1999.

Founder, director and co-owner of risk management company SO3 Projects, Parr has overseen security for television productions and has provided consultancy services to clients. He is also the owner of SO3 Media. Parr has a Master's degree in security and risk management from the University of Leicester, awarded with distinction, and a PhD awarded by King's College London. He is also an Associate of King's College (AKC). An ocean yachtmaster, he works as a risk management consultant and splits his remaining time between ocean cruising, writing and studying.

Parr is a Fellow of the Royal Geographical Society (FRGS) and a Member of the Royal Institute of International Affairs (Chatham House). He was appointed a Member of the Order of the British Empire (military division) (MBE) in the 2000 New Year Honours.
