= Royal Astronomical Society =

British learned society and charity

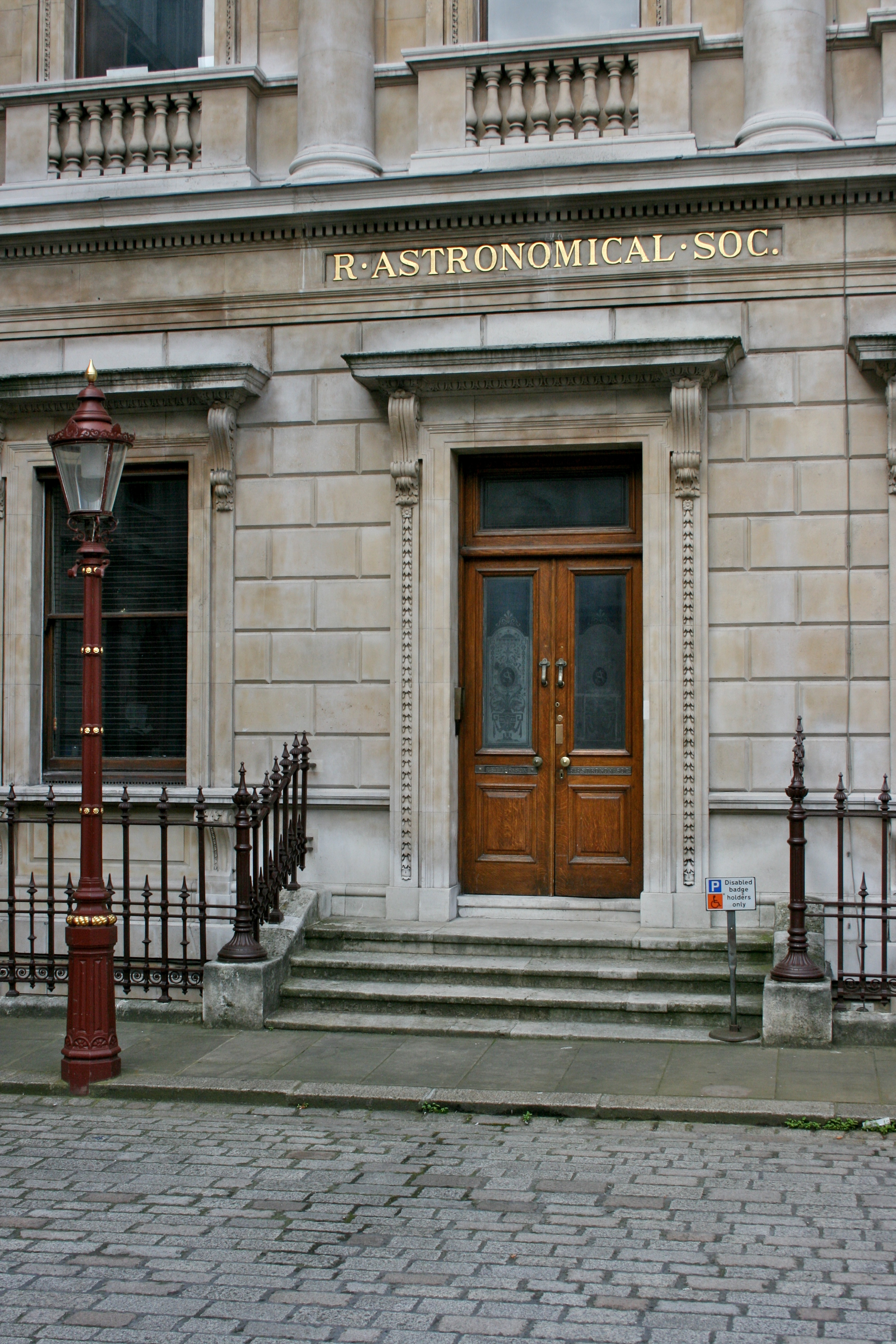
- Entrance to the Royal Astronomical Society at Burlington House, London
- Abbreviation: RAS
- Formation: 10 March 1820; 206 years ago
- Type: NGO, learned society
- Legal status: Registered charity
- Purpose: To promote the sciences of astronomy & geophysics
- Professional title: Fellow of the Royal Astronomical Society (FRAS)
- Headquarters: Burlington House
- Location: Piccadilly, London
- Coordinates: 51°30′32″N 0°8′22″W
- Patron: King Charles III
- President: Jim Wild
- Executive Director: Ian Russell
- Website: www.ras.ac.uk
- Formerly called: Astronomical Society of London (1820–31)

The Royal Astronomical Society (RAS) is a learned society and charity that encourages and promotes the study of astronomy, solar-system science, geophysics and closely related branches of science. Its headquarters are in Burlington House, on Piccadilly in London. The society has over 4,000 members, known as fellows, most of whom are professional researchers or postgraduate students. Around a quarter of Fellows live outside the UK.

The society holds monthly scientific meetings in London, and the annual National Astronomy Meeting at varying locations in the British Isles. The RAS publishes the scientific journals Monthly Notices of the Royal Astronomical Society, Geophysical Journal International and RAS Techniques and Instruments, along with the trade magazine Astronomy & Geophysics.

The RAS maintains an astronomy research library, engages in public outreach and advises the UK government on astronomy education. The society recognises achievement in astronomy and geophysics by issuing annual awards and prizes, with its highest award being the Gold Medal of the Royal Astronomical Society. The RAS is the UK adhering organisation to the International Astronomical Union and a member of the UK Science Council.

== History ==
=== Founding ===
The idea for a dedicated astronomical society had been discussed for several years before the society's formal founding; William Pearson is recorded as having proposed one as early as 1812, and Francis Baily published a recommendation in 1819. By the early nineteenth century, many astronomers felt that the Royal Society, under the long presidency of the octogenarian Sir Joseph Banks, was no longer adequately serving their interests; Banks's own expertise lay in botany and natural history rather than the physical sciences.

On 12 January 1820, fourteen men met for dinner at the Freemasons' Tavern in Lincoln's Inn Fields, London, to discuss the establishment of an astronomical society. Among them were John Herschel, Charles Babbage, Henry Thomas Colebrooke, Thomas Colby, Francis Baily and William Pearson. At the dinner, a committee of eight was appointed to draw up rules, with Daniel Moore elected chairman, Baily as secretary, and Herschel tasked with drafting an address setting out the society's objectives. The new body, named the Astronomical Society of London, held its first general meeting on 8 February 1820 in the rooms of the Geological Society in Bedford Street, Covent Garden, and its first council meeting on 10 March 1820.

The society's initial objectives were the promotion of astronomy through accurate calculations and observations, as well as practical applications such as navigation. In its early years the society also campaigned for reform of the Nautical Almanac. Its motto, chosen by William Herschel, is Quicquid nitet notandum ("whatever shines should be observed").

The society encountered an early setback when its first elected president, the Duke of Somerset, resigned after only a week, explaining that Banks believed the new body would damage the Royal Society. William Herschel then agreed to serve as the titular first president, though he never actually took the chair at a meeting due to his advanced age. When the society was founded, most members were 'gentleman astronomers' rather than professionals; there were very few professional astronomers in Britain at the time.

=== Royal Charter and early growth ===
The society first sought a charter in February 1830. Its president, Sir James South, petitioned the King, and on 15 December 1830 the King signed as Patron of the Society. A Royal Charter was formally signed by William IV on 7 March 1831, and the society assumed the name Royal Astronomical Society that it has used ever since.

Publication of research was a central activity from the beginning. The Memoirs of the Royal Astronomical Society began in 1822, and Monthly Notices of the Royal Astronomical Society (MNRAS) started in 1827; Richard Sheepshanks, a prominent early fellow, was the first editor of MNRAS. The society's first Gold Medals were awarded in 1824, to Charles Babbage and Johann Franz Encke. Caroline Herschel received the Gold Medal in 1828 for her catalogue of nebulae, becoming the first woman so honoured; no other woman would receive it until Vera Rubin in 1996.

In 1835, the Council awarded honorary membership to Caroline Herschel and Mary Somerville, the first women to be so recognised. A small number of other women subsequently received honorary membership, including Anne Sheepshanks, Lady Huggins, Agnes Mary Clerke, Annie Jump Cannon and Williamina Fleming.

In 1846 the RAS absorbed the Spitalfields Mathematical Society, which had been founded in 1717 but was suffering from a decline in membership and dwindling finances. The nineteen remaining members of the mathematical society were given free lifetime membership of the RAS; in exchange, their society's extensive library was donated to the RAS.

=== Premises ===
The society met in various locations during its early decades, including the rooms of the Geological Society in Bedford Street, Covent Garden, and subsequently rented rooms from the Medical and Chirurgical Society at 57 Lincoln's Inn Fields. In 1834, the government provided accommodation in Somerset House, where the society occupied seven (later eight) rooms. When the expansion of the Civil Service made space at Somerset House increasingly scarce, the government commissioned purpose-built apartments in the wings of Burlington House, Piccadilly, designed by architects R. R. Banks and Charles Barry Jr. The society moved into Burlington House in 1874, holding its first meeting there on 13 November of that year, and has occupied the premises ever since.

=== Women and fellowship ===
In 1886, Isis Pogson became the first woman to be nominated for fellowship, put forward by her father and two other fellows. Her nomination was withdrawn when lawyers advised that the society's Royal Charter referred to fellows only as he and therefore restricted fellowship to men. Between 1835 and 1916, women were not allowed to become fellows, though a small number were made honorary members.

A Supplemental Charter in 1915 opened fellowship to women. On 14 January 1916, Mary Adela Blagg, Ella K Church, A Grace Cook, Irene Elizabeth Toye Warner and Fiammetta Wilson were the first five women elected to Fellowship. In total, eleven women were elected fellows in 1916. The first woman to serve as president of the society was Dame Carole Jordan, elected in 1994.

=== Twentieth century and beyond ===
The RAS played a significant role in the 1919 test of general relativity. The Joint Permanent Eclipse Committee of the Royal Society and the RAS organised two expeditions to observe the total solar eclipse of 29 May 1919—one to Príncipe and another to Sobral, Brazil—led by Arthur Eddington and coordinated by Astronomer Royal Frank Watson Dyson. The results, presented at a joint meeting of the Royal Society and the RAS on 6 November 1919, confirmed Albert Einstein's prediction of the gravitational deflection of starlight and brought Einstein worldwide fame.

Geophysics, which had always been among the interests of the membership, was formally added to the society's scope during the twentieth century. Geophysical papers were initially published in MNRAS, then in a Geophysical Supplement to MNRAS (1922–1957), before a separate Geophysical Journal of the Royal Astronomical Society was launched in 1958. This later merged with two European journals to become Geophysical Journal International.

To cater for the growing interest in amateur astronomy, several members of the RAS helped found the British Astronomical Association in 1890, which from the outset admitted both men and women.

The society celebrated its bicentenary in 2020. As of 2020, it has over 4,000 fellows, the majority of whom are professional researchers or postgraduate students in astronomy or geophysics, with its headquarters remaining at Burlington House.

== Publications ==
One of the major activities of the RAS is publishing refereed journals. It publishes three primary research journals: Monthly Notices of the Royal Astronomical Society for topics in astronomy; Geophysical Journal International for topics in geophysics (in association with the Deutsche Geophysikalische Gesellschaft); and RAS Techniques & Instruments for research methods in those disciplines. The society also publishes a trade magazine for members, Astronomy & Geophysics.

The history of journals published by the RAS (with abbreviations used by the Astrophysics Data System) is:

- Memoirs of the Royal Astronomical Society (MmRAS): 1822–1977
- Monthly Notices of the Royal Astronomical Society (MNRAS): 1827–present
- Geophysical Supplement to Monthly Notices (MNRAS): 1922–1957
- Geophysical Journal (GeoJ): 1958–1988
- Geophysical Journal International (GeoJI): 1989–present (volume numbering continues from GeoJ)
- Quarterly Journal of the Royal Astronomical Society (QJRAS): 1960–1996
- Astronomy & Geophysics (A&G): 1997–present (volume numbering continues from QJRAS)
- RAS Techniques & Instruments (RASTI): 2021–present

== Membership ==
=== Fellows ===
Full members of the RAS are styled Fellows, and may use the post-nominal letters FRAS. Fellowship is open to anyone over the age of 18 whose application is acceptable to the society; new fellows are elected by the Council. Eligible applicants include those with a professional interest in astronomy or geophysics, amateurs who have demonstrated a strong commitment to these fields, and other professionals who serve the wider interests of the society. As a result of the society's foundation in a time before there were many professional astronomers, no formal qualifications are required. The fellowship consists of PhD-level professional scientists, postgraduate researchers, retired scientists, amateur scientists and undergraduates; around a quarter of fellows are based overseas. The society is a member of the Science Council and acts as the professional body for astronomers and geophysicists in the UK. As of 2025, the society has more than 4,000 fellows.

=== Friends ===
In 2009 an initiative was launched for those with an interest in astronomy and geophysics but without professional qualifications or specialist knowledge in the subject. Such people may join the Friends of the RAS, which offers popular talks, visits and social events.

== Meetings ==
The Society organises an extensive programme of meetings:

The biggest RAS meeting each year is the National Astronomy Meeting, a major conference of professional astronomers. It is held over 4–5 days each spring or early summer, usually at a university campus in the United Kingdom. Hundreds of astronomers attend each year.

More frequent smaller 'highlight' meetings feature lectures about research topics in astronomy and geophysics, often given by winners of the society's awards. They are normally held in Burlington House in London on the afternoon of the second Friday of each month from October to May. The talks are intended to be accessible to a broad audience of astronomers and geophysicists, and are free for anyone to attend (not just members of the society). Formal reports of the meetings are published in The Observatory magazine.

Specialist discussion meetings are held on the same day as each highlight meeting. These are aimed at professional scientists in a particular research field, and allow several speakers to present new results or reviews of scientific fields. Usually two discussion meetings on different topics (one in astronomy and one in geophysics) take place simultaneously at different locations within Burlington House, prior to the day's highlight meeting. They are free for members of the society, but charge a small entry fee for non-members.

The RAS holds a regular programme of public lectures aimed at a general, non-specialist, audience. These are mostly held on Tuesdays once a month, with the same talk given twice: once at lunchtime and once in the early evening. The venues have varied, but are usually in Burlington House or another nearby location in central London. The lectures are free, though some popular sessions require booking in advance.

The society occasionally hosts or sponsors meetings in other parts of the United Kingdom, often in collaboration with other scientific societies and universities.

== Library ==
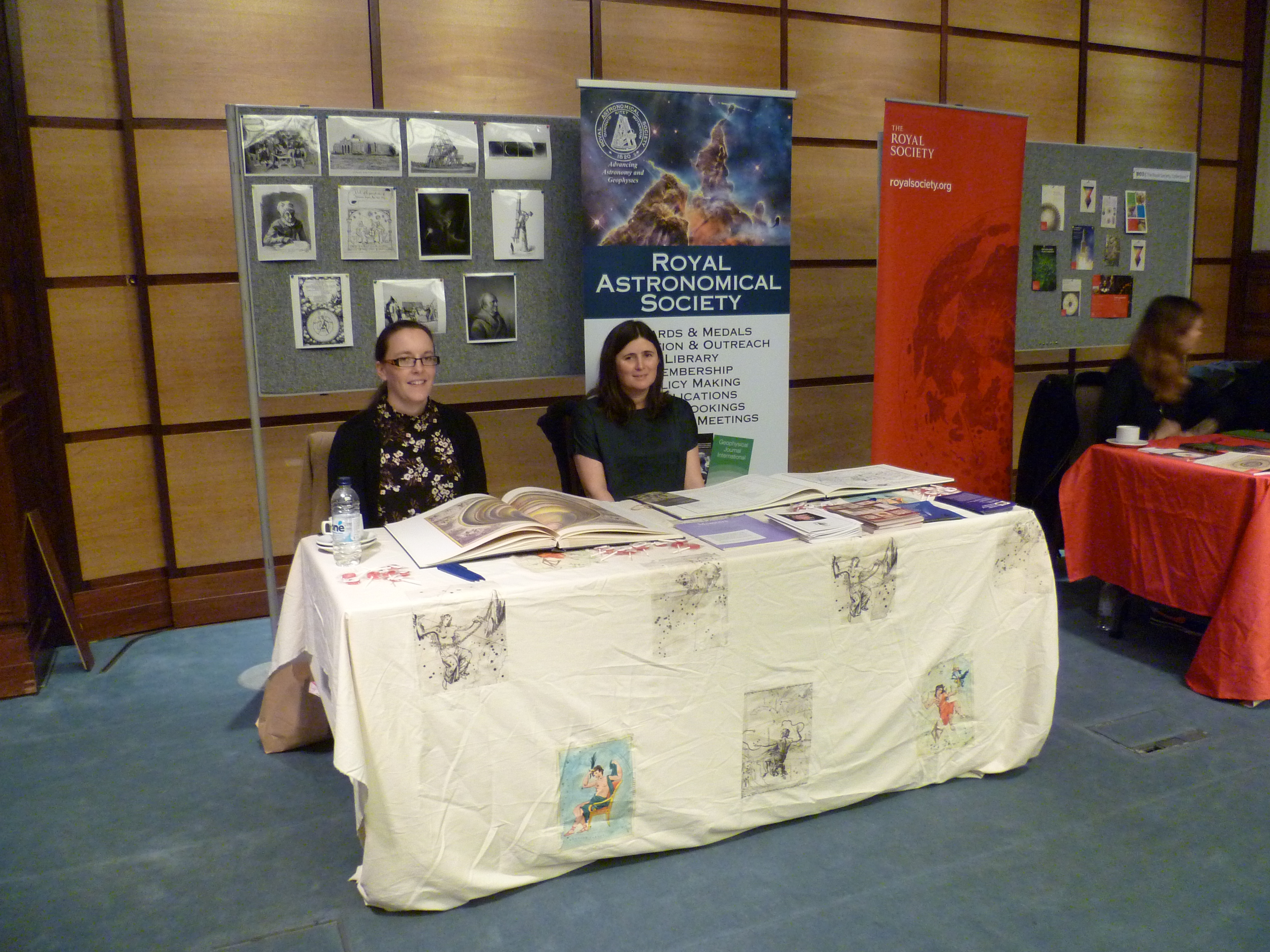
The Royal Astronomical Society at the University of London History Day, 2016.

The Royal Astronomical Society has a more comprehensive collection of books and journals in astronomy and geophysics than the libraries of most universities and research institutions. The library receives some 300 current periodicals in astronomy and geophysics and contains more than 10,000 books from popular level to conference proceedings. Its collection of astronomical rare books is second only to that of the Royal Observatory in Edinburgh in the UK. The RAS library is a major resource not just for the society but also the wider community of astronomers, geophysicists, and historians.

== Education ==
The society promotes astronomy to members of the general public through its outreach pages for students, teachers, the public and media researchers. The RAS has an advisory role in relation to UK public examinations, such as GCSEs and A Levels.

== Associated groups ==
The RAS sponsors topical groups, many of them in interdisciplinary areas where the group is jointly sponsored by another learned society or professional body:

- The Astrobiology Society of Britain (with the NASA Astrobiology Institute)
- The Astroparticle Physics Group (with the Institute of Physics)
- The Astrophysical Chemistry Group (with the Royal Society of Chemistry)
- The British Geophysical Association (with the Geological Society of London)
- The Magnetosphere Ionosphere and Solar-Terrestrial group (generally known by the acronym MIST)
- The UK Planetary Forum
- The UK Solar Physics group

== Presidents ==
The first person to hold the title of President of the Royal Astronomical Society was William Herschel, though he never chaired a meeting, and since then the post has been held by many distinguished astronomers. The post has generally had a term of office of two years, but some holders resigned after one year e.g. due to poor health. Francis Baily and George Airy were elected a record four times each. Baily's eight years in the role are a record (Airy served for seven). Since 1876 no one has served for more than two years in total.

The current president is Jim Wild, who began his term in May 2026 and will serve for two years.

== Awards and prizes ==
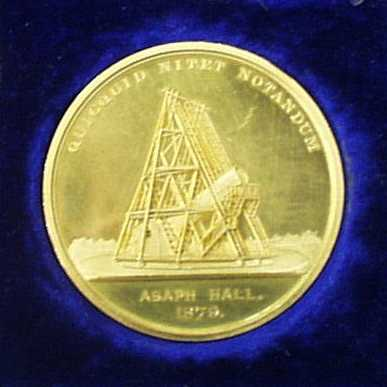
The Gold Medal of the Royal Astronomical Society awarded to Asaph Hall

The highest award of the Royal Astronomical Society is its Gold Medal, which can be awarded for any purpose but most frequently recognises extraordinary lifetime achievement. Among the recipients best known to the general public are Albert Einstein in 1926, and Stephen Hawking in 1985.

Other awards are for particular topics in astronomy or geophysics research, which include the Eddington Medal, the Herschel Medal, the Chapman Medal and the Price Medal. Beyond research, there are specific awards for school teaching (Patrick Moore Medal), public outreach (Annie Maunder Medal), instrumentation (Jackson-Gwilt Medal) and history of science (Agnes Mary Clerke Medal). Lectureships include the Harold Jeffreys Lectureship in geophysics, the George Darwin Lectureship in astronomy, and the Gerald Whitrow Lectureship in cosmology. Each year, the society grants a handful of free memberships for life (termed honorary fellowship) to prominent researchers resident outside the UK.

== Other activities ==
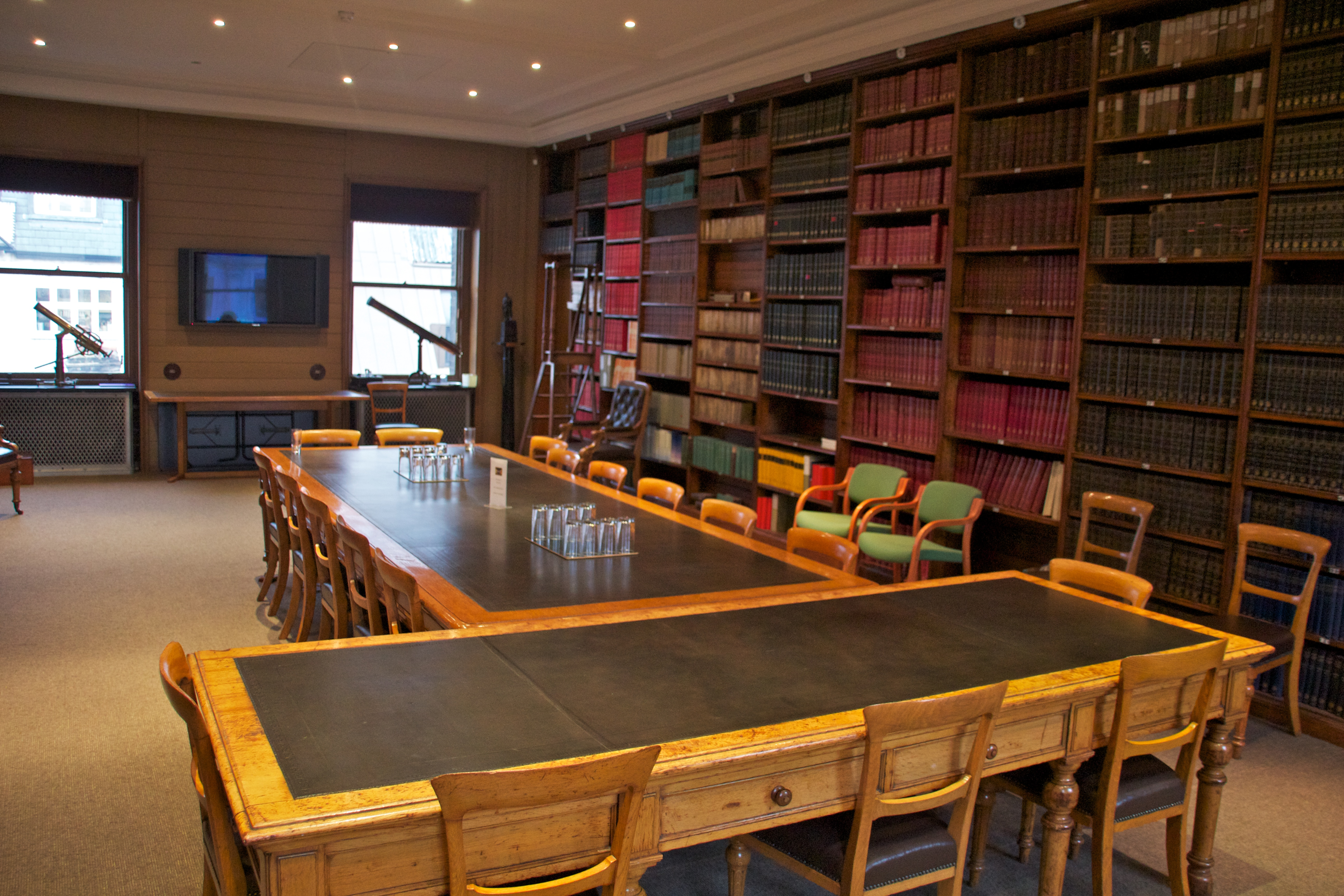
The council room at the RAS

The society occupies premises at Burlington House, London, where a library and meeting rooms are available to fellows and other interested parties. The society represents the interests of astronomy and geophysics to UK national and regional, and European government and related bodies, and maintains a press office, through which it keeps the media and the public at large informed of developments in these sciences. The society allocates grants to worthy causes in astronomy and geophysics, and assists in the management of the Paneth Trust.

== See also ==
- National Astronomy Week (NAW)
- List of astronomical societies
- List of geoscience organizations
