= UCL Faculty of Mathematical and Physical Sciences =

English research faculty

Coordinates: 51.52563°N 0.13331°W

- Dean: Professor Ivan Parkin
- Administrative staff: 445 (Academic and research staff (as at October 2009))
- Students: 1,833 (Undergraduate (2008/09)); 544 (Graduate (2008/09))
- Location: London, United Kingdom
- Website: UCL Faculty of Mathematical and Physical Sciences

The UCL Faculty of Mathematical and Physical Sciences is one of the 11 constituent faculties of University College London (UCL). The Faculty, the UCL Faculty of Engineering Sciences and the UCL Faculty of the Built Environment (The Bartlett) together form the UCL School of the Built Environment, Engineering and Mathematical and Physical Sciences.

== Departments ==
The Faculty currently comprises the following departments:

- UCL Department of Chemistry
- UCL Department of Earth Sciences
- UCL Department of Mathematics
  - Chalkdust is an online mathematics interest magazine published by Department of Mathematics students starting in 2015
- UCL Department of Natural Sciences
- UCL Department of Physics & Astronomy
- UCL Department of Science and Technology Studies
- UCL Department of Space & Climate Physics (Mullard Space Science Laboratory)
- UCL Department of Statistical Science
- London Centre for Nanotechnology - a joint venture between UCL and Imperial College London established in 2003 following the award of a £13.65m higher education grant under the Science Research Infrastructure Fund.

== Research centres and institutes ==
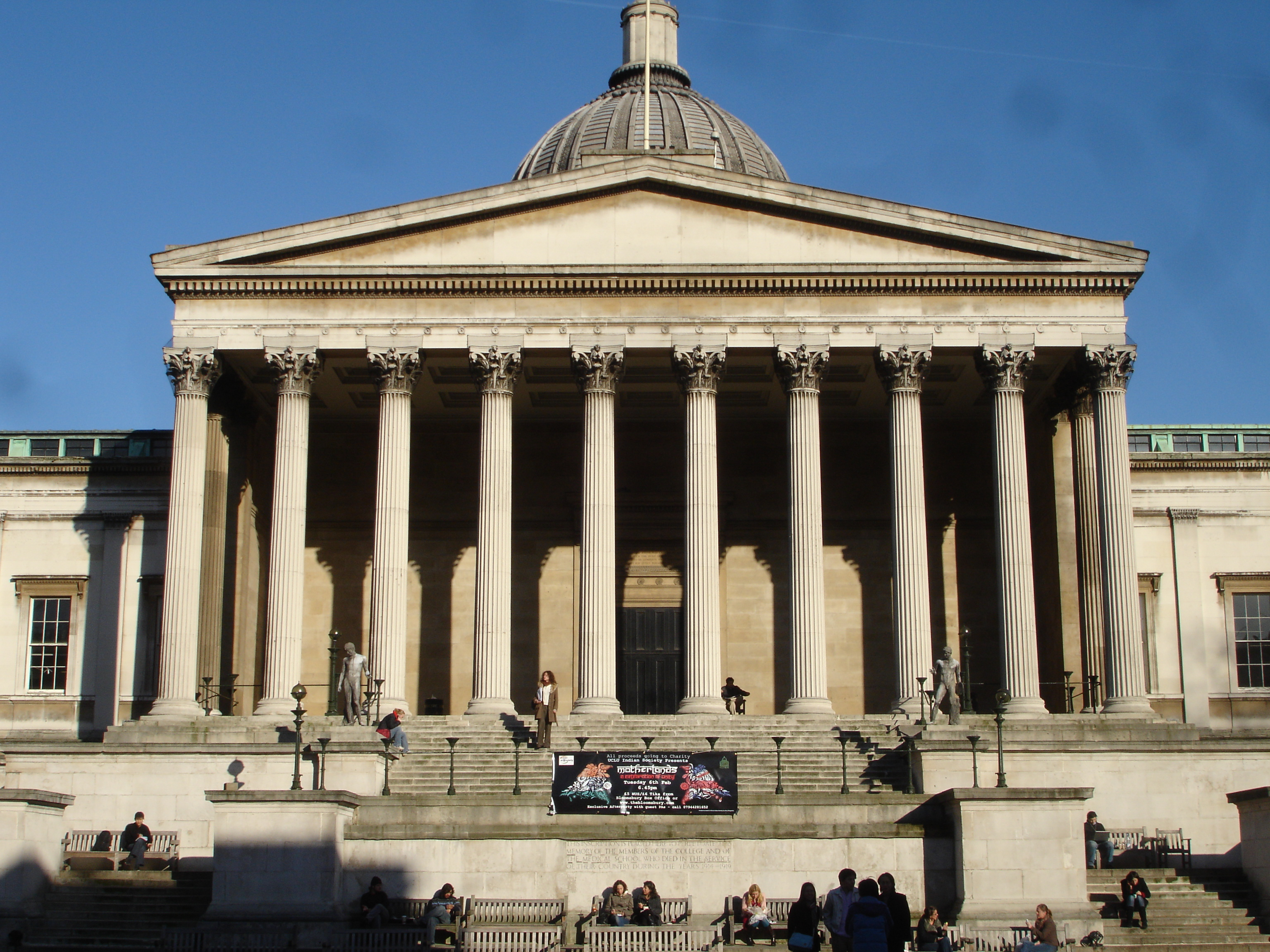
University College London

The Faculty is closely involved with the following research centres and institutes:

- UCL Centre for Materials Research
- UCL Centre for Mathematics and Physics in the Life Sciences and Experimental Biology (CoMPLEX) - an inter-disciplinary virtual centre that seeks to bring together mathematicians, physical scientists, computer scientists and engineers upon the problems posed by complexity in biology and biomedicine. The centre works with 29 departments and Institutes across UCL. It has a MRes/PhD program that requires that its students also belong to at least one of these Departments/Institutes. The centre is based in the Physics Building on the UCL main campus.
- Centre for Planetary Science at UCL/Birkbeck
- UCL Clinical Operational Research Unit (CORU) - CORU sits within the Department of Mathematics and is a team of researchers dedicated to applying operational research, data analysis and mathematical modelling to problems in health care.
- UCL Institute of Origins
- UCL Institute for Healthcare Engineering (IHE) - IHE is concerned with digital and medical technologies.
- UCL Institute for Risk and Disaster Reduction
- The Thomas Young Centre

== Rankings ==
In the 2013 Academic Ranking of World Universities, UCL is ranked joint 51st to 75th in the world (and joint 12th in Europe) for Natural Sciences and Mathematics.

In the 2013 QS World University Rankings, UCL is ranked 38th in the world (and 12th in Europe) for Natural Sciences. In the 2014 QS World University Rankings by Subject, UCL is ranked joint 51st-100th in the world (and joint 12th in Europe) for Chemistry, joint 27th in the world (and 8th in Europe) for Earth & Marine Sciences, joint 51st-100th in the world (and joint 13th in Europe) for Materials Science, joint 36th in the world (and joint 10th in Europe) for Mathematics, 35th in the world (and 13th in Europe) for Physics & Astronomy, and 47th in the world (and 9th in Europe) for Statistics & Operational Research.

In the 2013/14 Times Higher Education World University Rankings, UCL is ranked 51st in the world (and 16th in Europe) for Physical Sciences.

== Notable people ==
- Michael Abraham
- William Ramsay
- Steven T. Bramwell
- M. J. Seaton
- Sigurd Zienau
- Andrew Fisher
- Paul Davies
- Edwin Power
- Peter Higgs
- Otto Hahn
- Charles K. Kao
- Andrea Sella
- Raman Prinja
- Helen Wilson
- Hannah Fry

== See also ==
- Birkbeck, University of London
- Imperial College London
