= Ariel 5 =

A5 in Vineria Publish ASD100SRDNA12

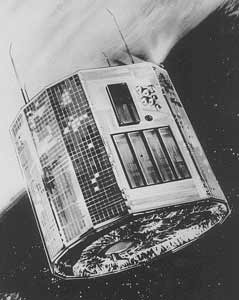
- Names: Ariel5, PL-732B, UK 5, United Kingdom 5
- Mission type: Astronomy
- Operator: SERC / NASA
- COSPAR ID: 1974-077A
- SATCAT no.: 7471

Spacecraft properties
- Manufacturer: Goddard Space Flight Center
- Launch mass: 130.5 kg (288 lb)

Start of mission
- Launch date: 15 October 1974, 07:47:00 UTC
- Rocket: Scout B-1
- Launch site: San Marco

End of mission
- Decay date: 14 March 1980

Orbital parameters
- Eccentricity: 0.00325
- Perigee altitude: 512 km (318 mi)
- Apogee altitude: 557 km (346 mi)
- Inclination: 2.9 degrees
- Period: 95.3 minutes
- Epoch: 14 October 1974, 23:00:00 UTC

Instruments
- Rotation Modulation Collimator; 2- to 10-KeV Sky Survey Instrument; High-Resolution Source Spectra; Bragg Crystal Spectrometer; High-Energy Cosmic X-Ray Spectra; All-Sky Monitor

Ariel 5 (or UK 5) was a joint British and American space telescope dedicated to observing the sky in the X-ray band. It was launched on 15 October 1974 from the San Marco platform in the Indian Ocean and operated until 1980. It was the penultimate satellite to be launched as part of the Ariel programme.

== Background ==
Ariel 5 was the fifth and penultimate satellite of the joint British and American Ariel programme. It was the third satellite in the series built entirely in the UK. It was named UK 5 before launch and renamed to Ariel 5 after the successful launch.

Plans for Ariel 5 were first discussed between the UK and US in May 1967 at the Ariel 3 launch. The Science Research Council (SRC) advertised a request for proposal for experiments in June. Experiments were formally proposed to NASA in July 1968.

== Satellite design ==
=== Development ===
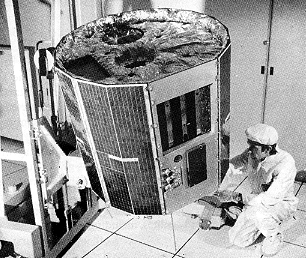
Technicians servicing Ariel 5 satellite

Marconi Space and Defence Systems (MSDS) in Portsmouth was selected as the prime contractor in 1969. SRC had them select MSDS Frimley for the attitude control system (ACS) and MSDS Stanmore for the core stores.

A study was performed to see if the Scout rocket's heat shield could be enlarged to accommodate larger experiments for this mission. A larger heat shield was designed which allowed for a US experiment and five British experiments.

=== Operation ===
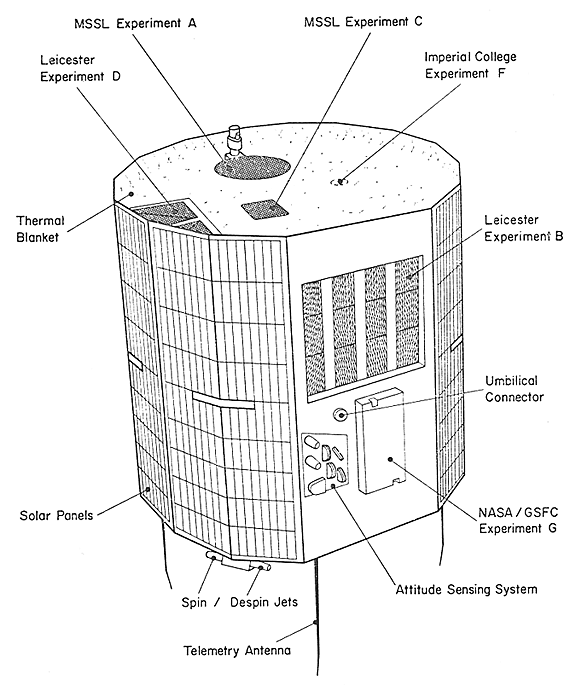
Arrangement of instruments on Ariel 5

Ariel 5 was spin-stabilized. The satellite improved on the attitude control of Ariel 4. It used liquid propane that was expanded through a reducing valve and heated with the bulk tank temperature.

Power was derived from solar cells that were mounted to 7/8 of the circumference of the spacecraft. It was stored in a 3.0 Ah Ni-Cd battery.

=== Sensors ===
The all-sky monitor (ASM) was two one-dimensional pinhole cameras scanned most of the sky every spacecraft revolution. The angular resolution was 10° × 10°, with an effective area of 3 cm^{2} (0.465 sq in), and a bandpass of 3–6 keV. The ASM was designed to fit a resource budget of 2 kg (4.4 lb), 1 bit per second, and 1 W.

The sky survey instrument (SSI) had an angular resolution of 0.75 × 10.6°, with an effective area of 290 cm^{2} (45 sq in), and a bandpass of 2–20 keV.

== Mission ==
=== Launch ===
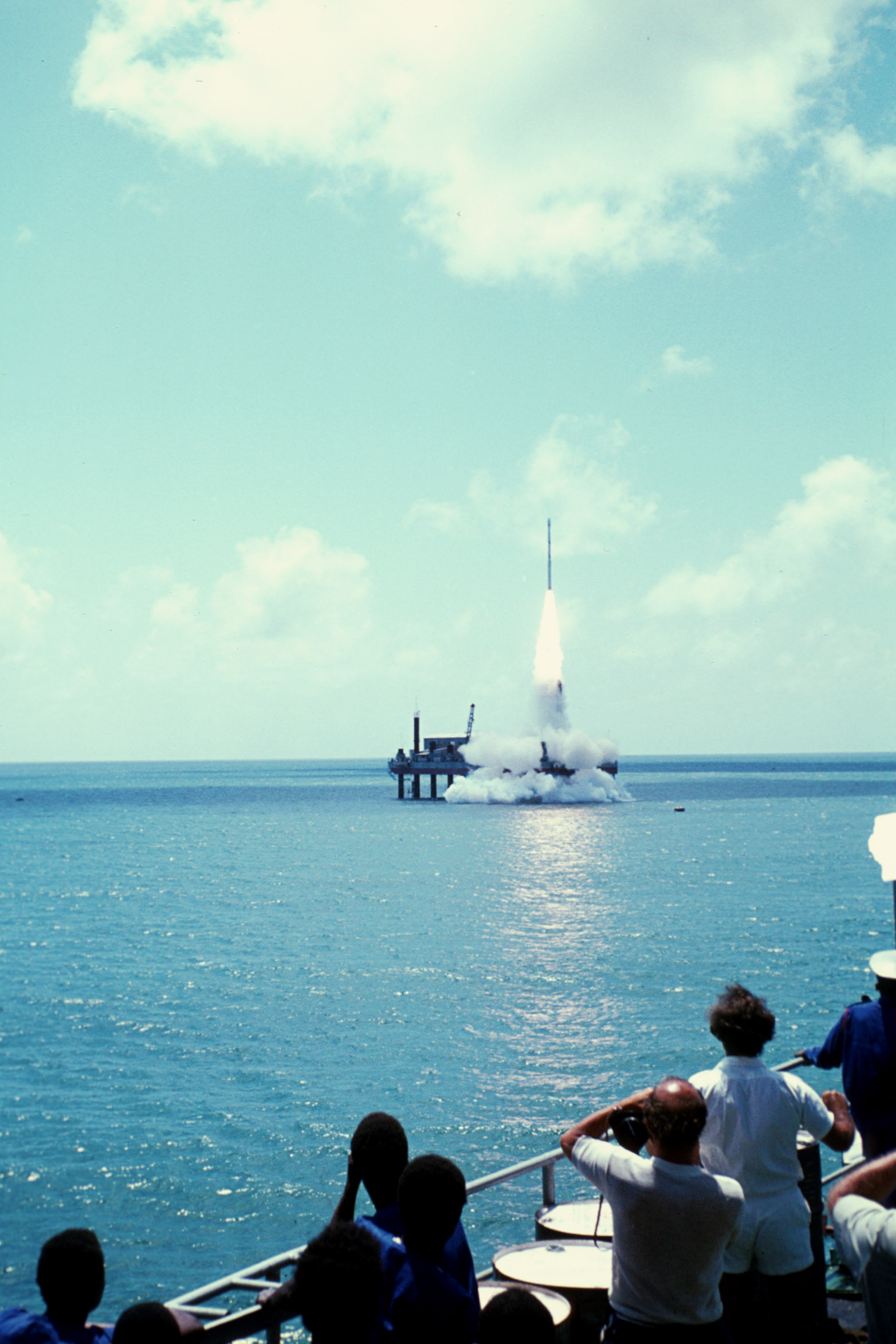
Ariel 5 launch from San Marco Platform

Launch operations took six weeks, starting from the time the Guppy took off from Thorney Island. The satellite was launched on 15 October 1974 from the San Marco platform in the Indian Ocean off the coast of Kenya.

=== Operations ===
The satellite was controlled via a mission control centre in Appleton Lab. It spun at over 10 revolutions/minute. Ariel 5 operated until 1980.

== Results ==
Over 100 scientific papers were published within four years of the launch.
