= Robert Boyd (physicist) =

Sir Robert Lewis Fullarton Boyd FRS (19 October 1922 – 5 February 2004) was a pioneer of British space science and founding director of the Mullard Space Science Laboratory (part of University College London).

Robert Boyd was born in Saltcoats, Ayrshire as one of two twin boys. He was a pupil at Whitgift School and studied at Imperial College (BSc(Eng) 1943) and University College London (PhD 1949; Fellow 1988).

His scientific career started at the Admiralty Mining Establishment in 1943 where he worked with some notable scientists, including Francis Crick, Thomas Gaskell and Harrie Massey. Massey would later encourage Boyd to engage in atmospheric physics research at UCL. His thesis was on New Techniques for the Study of Ionised Gases.

In addition to helping create the MSSL, Boyd played an instrumental role in the founding of the European Space Research Organization and its subsequent incarnation the European Space Agency (1974/75). Boyd succeeded Harrie Massey as the chair of the British National Committee for Space Research in 1976.

He became a Fellow of the Royal Society in 1969, was awarded its Bakerian Medal in 1978, and was knighted in 1983 in recognition of his services to space science.

Boyd was a committed Christian and he saw no conflict but subtle complementarity between science and religion. His 1950s and 1960s writings and lectures on this relationship helped Christians to be more influential in science, through the Research Scientists' Christian Fellowship.

== Career ==
- Experimental Officer at Admiralty Mining Establishment, 1943–46
- DSIR (UK) Research Assistant, 1946–49
- ICI Research Fellow, 1949–52
- Lecturer in Physics, UCL, 1952–58; Reader 1959-62
- Professor of Astronomy (part-time), Royal Institution, 1961–67
- Professor of Physics in the University of London, 1962–83, then Emeritus Professor
- Director, Mullard Space Science Laboratory, 1965–83.

== Other activities ==
- Council, Physical Society, 1958–60
- Council, Royal Astronomical Society, 1962-66 (vice-president, 1964–66)
- President, Victoria Institute, 1965–76
- Governor: St Lawrence College, 1965–76
- Governor: Croydon College, 1966–80
- IEE Appleton Lecturer, 1976
- Bakerian Lecturer, Royal Society, 1978
- Halley Lecturer, University of Oxford, 1981
- Chairman: Meteorology Research Committee and Astronautics Committee, Ministry of Defence, 1972–75
- Member: BBC Science Consultative Group, 1970–79
- Science Research Council, 1977-81 (chairman, Astronomy, Space and Radio Bd, 1977–80)
- British National Committee on Space Research, 1976–87
- Governor: Southlands College, 1976–94
- Trustee, National Maritime Museum, 1980–89
- Chairman, London Bible College, 1983–90.

== Honours ==
- Fellow of the Royal Society, 1969
- CBE, 1972
- Honorary DSc Heriot-Watt University, 1979
- Knight, 1983

== See also ==
- Admiralty Mining Establishment
- Atomic physics
