= Ariel programme =

Early British satellite research programme

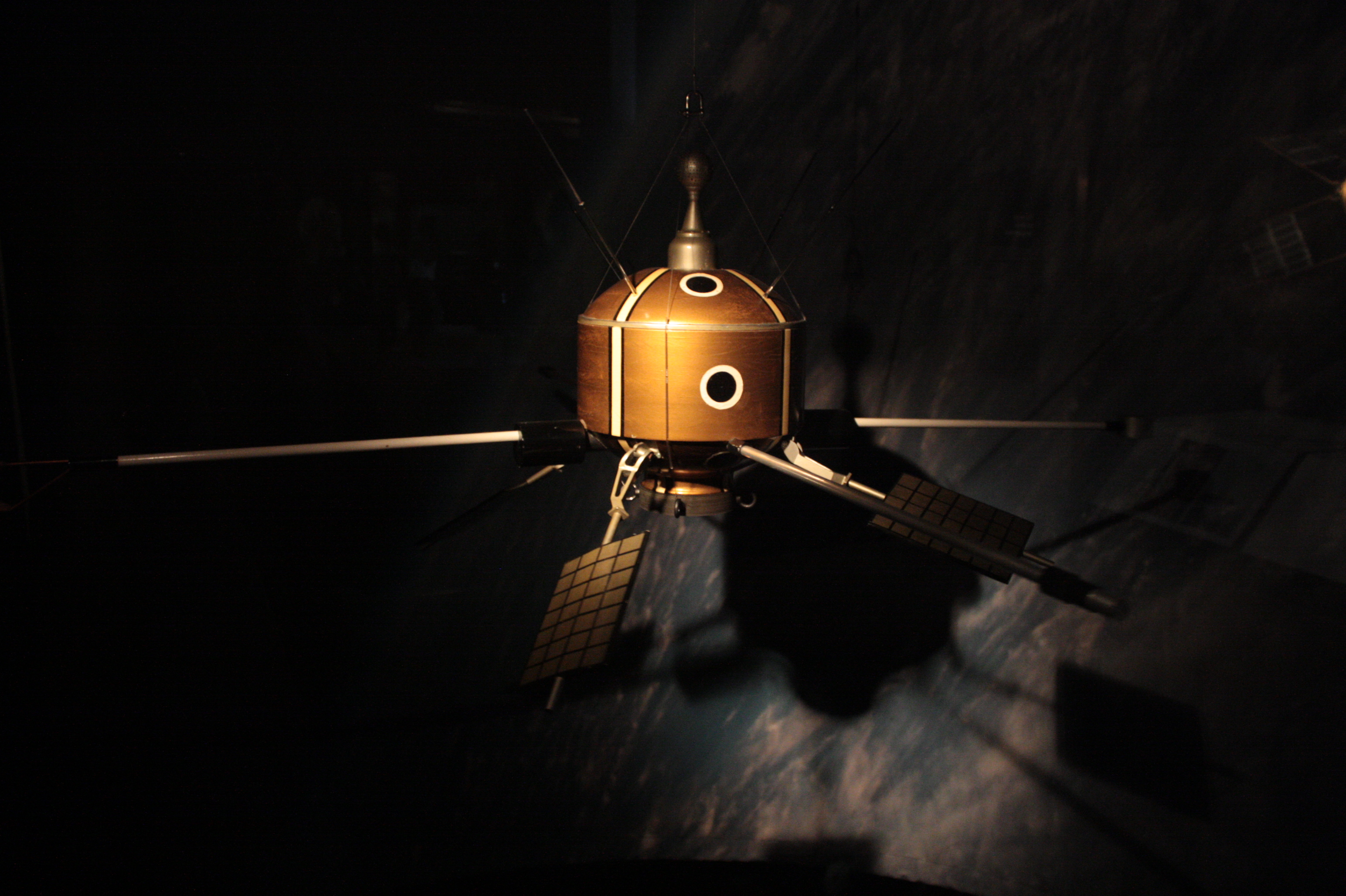
Ariel 1 scale model

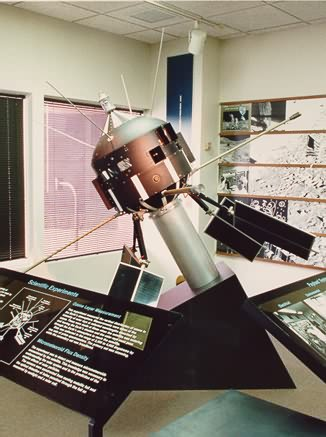
Ariel 2 mock-up

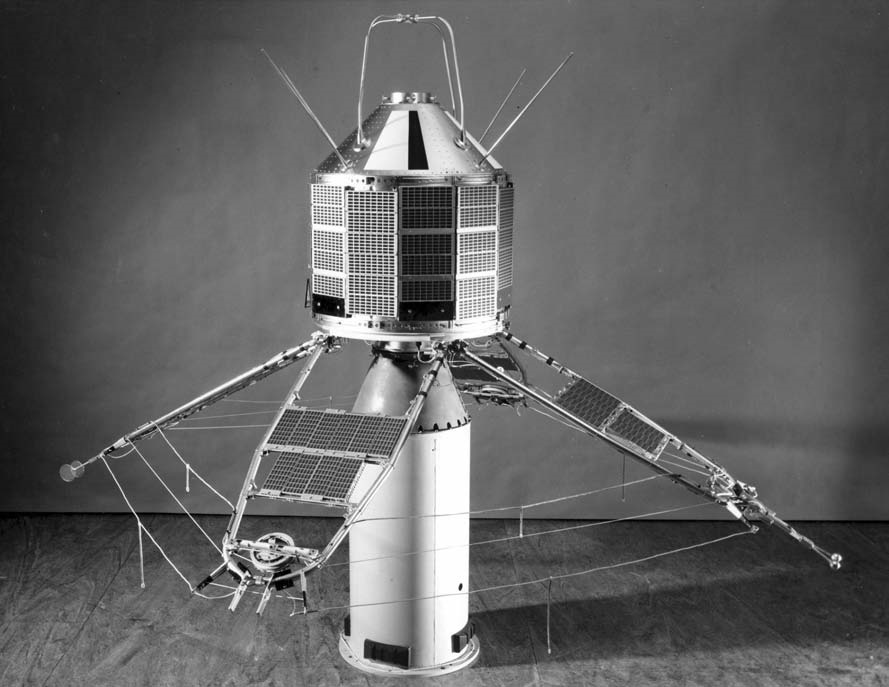
Ariel 3 with its paddles extended.

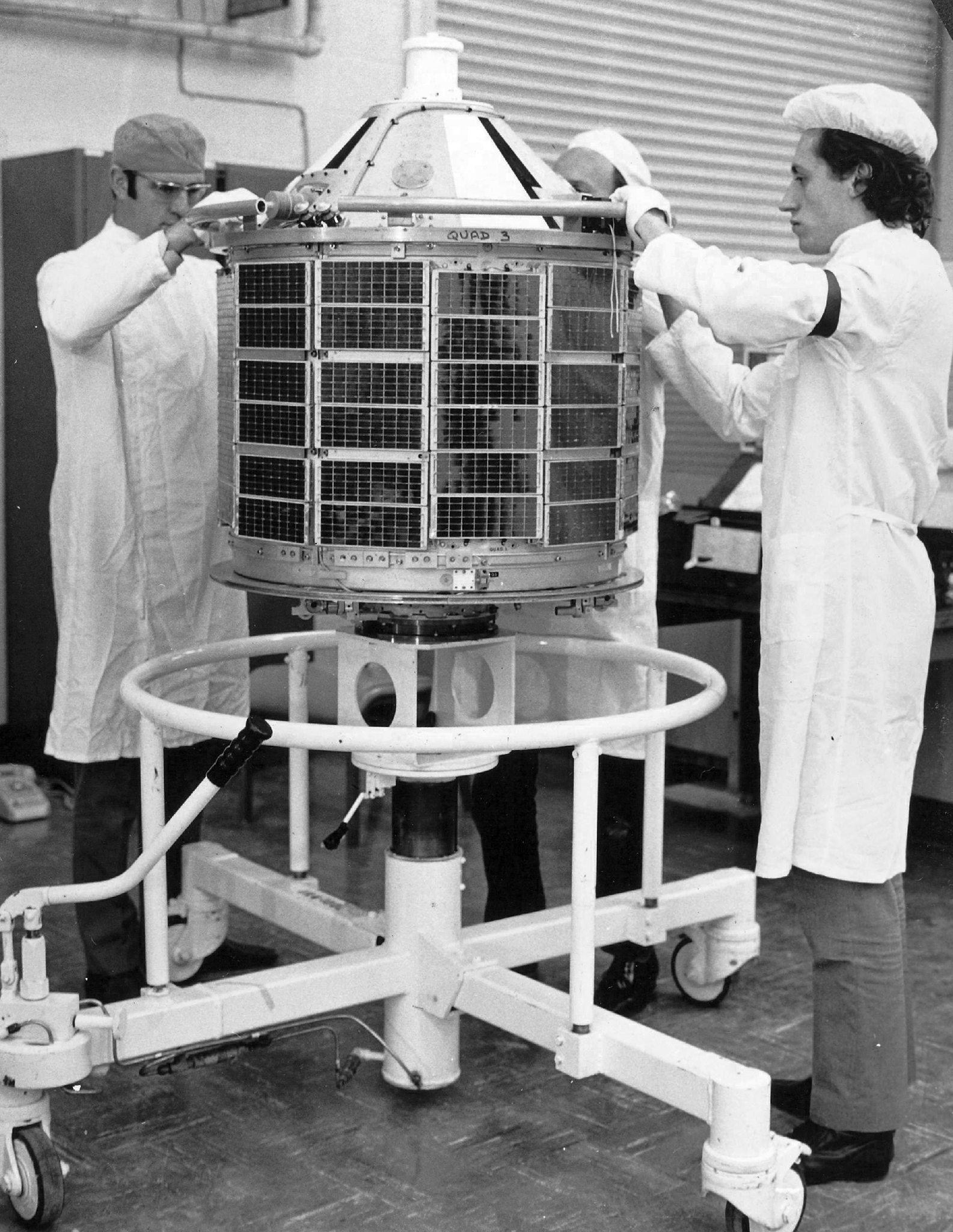
Ariel 4 satellite

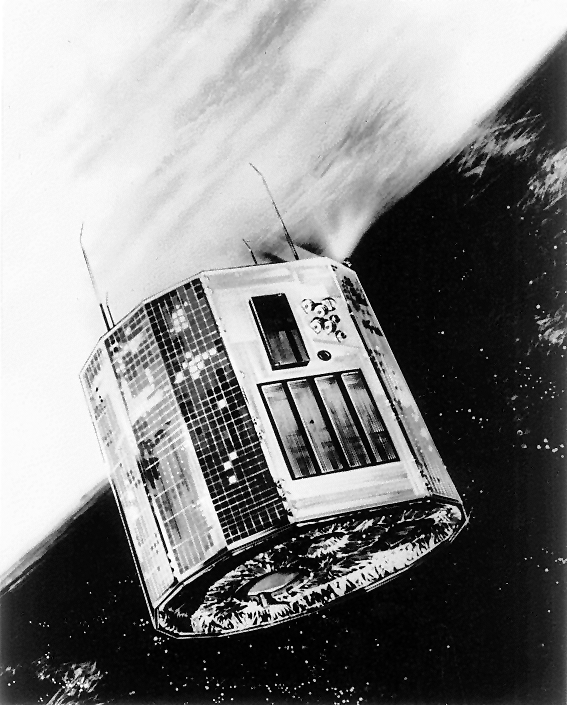
Ariel 5 illustration

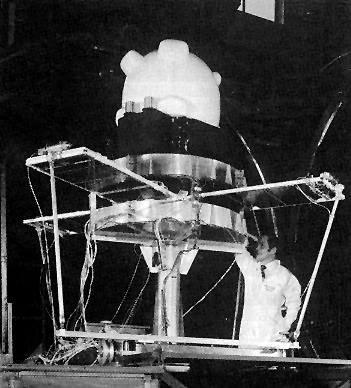
Ariel 6

Ariel was a British satellite research programme conducted between the early 1960s and 1980s. Six satellites were launched as part of the programme, starting with the first British satellite, Ariel 1, which was launched on 26 April 1962, and concluding with the launch of Ariel 6 on 2 June 1979. The launch of Ariel 1 made Britain the third country to have a satellite orbiting the Earth. The first four were devoted to studying the ionosphere, the remaining two to X-ray astronomy and cosmic-ray studies.

== Etymology ==
The name Ariel was suggested by the UK Minister of Science. The name was taken from a sprite in Shakespeare's The Tempest. Prior to launch, the satellites were designated as UK and were renamed Ariel once they successfully reached orbit (e.g. UK 1 to Ariel 1).

== Programme history ==
=== Managerial ===
At a meeting of the Committee on Space Research, the United States offered to provide assistance to other countries with the development and launch of scientific spacecraft. In late 1959, the British National Committee for Space Research (BNCSR) proposed the development of Ariel 1 to NASA. By early the following year the two countries had decided upon terms for the Ariel programme's scope and which organisations would be responsible for which parts of the programme.

In 1961 the UK Space Research Group accepted proposals for experiments to be carried on the third satellite of the Ariel programme. The BNCSR selected experiments from those proposals and submitted them to NASA in 1962. The scientific objectives for the mission were selected in January 1963, and full work on the satellite began in early 1964 due to organisational and financial difficulties.

Plans for Ariel 5 were first discussed between the UK and US in May 1967 at the Ariel 3 launch. The Science Research Council (SRC) advertised a request for proposal for experiments in June. Experiments were formally proposed to NASA in July 1968.

=== Operational ===
The first three satellites in the series were spin stabilized but had no attitude control system, which affected experiments which required pointing. Ariel 4 had some degree of attitude control by using magnetorquers. Since Ariel 5 was primarily an X-ray detecting satellite, more precise attitude control was needed. The spin rate could be actively changed using a propane cold gas thrusters, while spin angle was controlled with magnetorquers.

=== Experimental ===
The first four satellites primarily studied the ionosphere. It was realized that higher quality X-ray data could be collected in space, and the experiments of Ariel 5 were designed to meet that primary objective. The last satellite in the series had a cosmic ray experiment and two X-ray experiments which would expand the data collected by its predecessor.

=== Launch ===
All launches were conducted using American rockets. The Scout rocket was being developed as an inexpensive launcher for payloads up to 50 kilograms (110 lb) to low Earth orbit (LEO) and Ariel 1 was intended to launch on it. The Scout rocket was not ready in time, so Ariel 1 launched on the more expensive Thor-Delta, with the Americans footing the bill. The remaining Ariel satellites launched on Scouts.

The first two launches were on the East coast. The Ariel 3 launch was originally planned for Wallops, but in 1964 experimenters requested an inclination change to the proposed orbit to maximize scientific value. This change precipitated the launch site moving to the West coast. Three of the experiments on Ariel 4 were the same as its predecessor, so it too launched from Vandenberg AFB. Like the first Ariel programme satellites, Ariel 5 was planned to launch from Wallops Island. The satellite would perform better operationally and scientifically at a near-equatorial orbit, close to a 0° inclination. To achieve this it was launched from the Italian San Marco off the coast of Kenya. The last satellite in the series did not require a special orbit, so Wallops Island was used as the launch facility. This was the first launch that the SRC paid for; previous launches were funded by NASA.

Satellite	Launch date	Carrier rocket	Launch site	COSPAR ID	Comments
Ariel 1	1962-04-26	Thor-Delta	Cape Canaveral	1962-015A	Launch made Britain the third country to have a satellite orbit the Earth. Inadvertently damaged on 9 June 1962, by the high-altitude Starfish Prime nuclear test
Ariel 2	1964-03-27	Scout	Wallops Island	1964-015A	
Ariel 3	1967-05-05	Scout	Vandenberg	1967-042A	The first satellite designed and constructed in the United Kingdom.
Ariel 4	1971-12-11	Scout	Vandenberg	1971-109A	
Ariel 5	1974-10-15	Scout	San Marco	1974-077A	Satellite operations were directed from a control centre at the Appleton Lab.
Ariel 6	1979-06-02	Scout	Wallops Island	1979-047A	The last satellite in the Ariel series. The first satellite in the series that Britain paid for the entire launch cost.
