= Admiralty Mining Establishment =

British Royal Navy Department

Department overview
- Formed: 1915
- Preceding Department: Admiralty Gunnery Establishment
- Dissolved: 1951
- Superseding Department: Admiralty Underwater Counter measures and Weapon Establishment
- Type: Establishment

The Admiralty Mining Establishment originally known as the Mine Design Department was a technical department of the British Royal Navy responsible for both the design of naval mines and the development of suitable countermeasures from 1915 to 1951

== History ==
A mining department was originally established at the Admiralty in 1915, in 1919 the name was changed to the Mine Design Department (MDD) based at HMS Vernon in Portsmouth. In 1946, after being dispersed to various places during the war, in keeping with many technical departments it employed both military and highly skilled, civilian personnel. It was partly located near HMNB Portsmouth at West Leigh House, Havant as the Admiralty Mining Establishment (AME). In 1951, its role changed significantly as it was merged into a new larger department called the Underwater Counter measures and Weapon Establishment (UCWE). The UCWE was itself merged into the Admiralty Underwater Weapons Establishment, Portland in 1959.

== Notable personnel ==
During the Second World War it recruited a number of scientists to its ranks many of them went on to become highly regarded in their respective fields including;

- David Bates
- Robert Boyd
- Francis Crick,
- Thomas Gaskell
- John Gunn
- Harrie Massey
- Nevill Mott.

== Timeline ==
- Board of Admiralty, Admiralty, Mining Department, 1915-1919.
- Board of Admiralty, Admiralty Mine Design Department, 1919-1951.
- Board of Admiralty, Underwater Counter measures and Weapon Establishment, 1951-1959.
- Board of Admiralty, Admiralty Underwater Weapons Establishment, 1959-1964.
- Ministry of Defence, Navy Department, Underwater Weapons Establishment, Portland, 1964-1984.

== See also ==
- HMS Vernon (shore establishment)
