= Ariel VI =

Astronomical research satellite

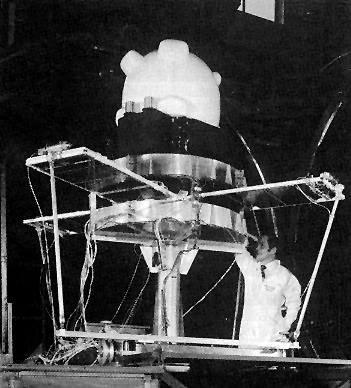
- UK-6 before launch
- Names: Ariel6, UK 6, United Kingdom 6
- Mission type: Astronomy
- Operator: Science Research Council (UK); NASA (US)
- COSPAR ID: 1979-047A
- SATCAT no.: 11382
- Mission duration: 2.5 years

Spacecraft properties
- Manufacturer: Marconi Company (UK)
- Launch mass: 154.5 kilograms (341 lb)

Start of mission
- Launch date: 2 June 1979, 23:26:00 UTC
- Rocket: Scout D-1 (SN S198C)
- Launch site: Wallops Flight Center, LA-3A

End of mission
- Deactivated: February 1982
- Decay date: 23 September 1990

Orbital parameters
- Reference system: Geocentric
- Regime: Low Earth
- Eccentricity: 0.00328
- Perigee altitude: 605 kilometres (376 mi)
- Apogee altitude: 651 kilometres (405 mi)
- Inclination: 55.0°
- Period: 97.3 minutes
- Epoch: 1 July 1979

Ariel VI, known pre-launch as UK-6, was a British and American satellite launched in 1979 as part of the Ariel programme. It was operated by the Science Research Council, which became the Science and Engineering Research Council in 1981. Ariel VI was used for astronomical research and provided data until February 1982. It was the last Ariel satellite to be launched.

== Satellite design ==
=== Operations ===
The spacecraft was manufactured by the Marconi Company, and had a mass of 154.5 kilograms (341 lb).

=== Sensors ===
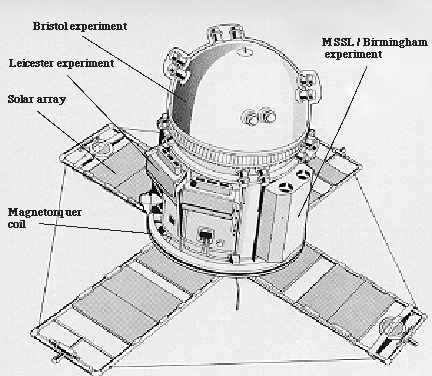
Diagram of Ariel VI

The primary experiment, the cosmic ray detector, could sense heavy cosmic rays with an atomic number over 30. The 480-millimetre (19 in) diameter acrylic-lined aluminum sphere was filled with a gaseous oxygen, nitrogen, and helium mixture. Heavy cosmic rays penetrated the sphere and excited the gas to produce scintillation light; the acrylic produced Cherenkov radiation. These ultraviolet emissions were detected with 16 photo-multipliers. Data processing to separate the two different types of ultraviolet emissions was performed by comparing the brightness and duration of the emissions. The amplitude of the signal was used to determine the atomic number of the cosmic ray. Unlike the X-ray experiments, this experiment had no pointing requirements other than what was required for thermal control.

The two other experiments were X-ray telescopes. One detected low-energy X-rays and the other high-energy X-rays.

== Mission ==
=== Launch ===
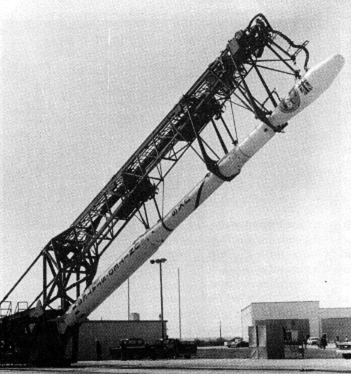
The Scout launch vehicle used to launch Ariel VI from Wallops Island

A Scout D-1 carrier rocket (SN S198C) was used to launch Ariel VI from Launch Area 3A at the Wallops Flight Center. The launch was successfully conducted at 23:26:00 UTC on 2 June 1979. Once the satellite achieved orbit it was renamed from UK-6 to Ariel 6.

=== Operations ===
Ariel 6 operated in a 599 by 653 kilometres (372 by 406 mi) low Earth orbit, at an inclination of 55.0° and with an orbital period of 97.22 minutes as of 15 July 1979. The satellite provided data until February 1982. It decayed from orbit and reentered the atmosphere on 23 September 1990.

== Results ==
Interference from radar signals prevented the satellite from pointing correctly, and affected the data that it returned.
