= Edwin Power =

English physicist (1928-2004)

Edwin Albert Power
- Born: 12 February 1928; Honiton, Devon, England
- Died: 31 January 2004 (aged 75); London, England
- Education: University College London (B.Sc, M.Sc); University of Glasgow (Ph.D)
- Known for: Thermal geons and his work on non-relativistic quantum electrodynamics
- Awards: Kelvin Prize (1951)
- Scientific career
- Fields: Theoretical physics, quantum electrodynamics
- Doctoral advisor: John Currie Gunn

Edwin Albert Power (12 February 1928 – 31 January 2004) was an English physicist and an emeritus professor of applied mathematics at University College London. He made several contributions to the field of non-relativistic quantum electrodynamics.

== Life ==
Power was born in Honiton, England on 12 February 1928. He obtained his BSc and MSc in mathematics from University College London in 1948 and 1949 respectively. He obtained his PhD under the supervision of John Currie Gunn at the University of Glasgow, for which he obtained the Kelvin Prize in 1951 (the prize recognizes the best physics thesis of the year). His doctoral work concerned meson production from proton–proton collisions.

After his PhD, he worked at University College, where became professor of applied mathematics in 1967, and fellow in 1991. In 1953, he became a Commonwealth Fund Fellow. He then spent two years in the United States, one at Cornell University, one at Princeton University. While at Princeton, he and John Wheeler worked on electromagnetism and gravity, resulting in the proposition of "thermal geons" in a paper published in Reviews of Modern Physics in 1957.

Power then researched non-relativistic quantum electrodynamics, particularly the interactions between radiation fields and particles, and developed several techniques. In 1959, he and Sigurd Zienau published a paper on the Coulomb gauge and its relation to the shape of spectral lines, non-relativistic Lamb shift, and other phenomena in the Philosophical Transactions of the Royal Society of London A. Power also studied the relation between quantum electrodynamics and various optical and molecular phenomena. In 1964, he published a book, Introductory Quantum Electrodynamics, based on a series of lectures he gave in Chile and the US.

Power retired as a professor in 1993, but remained active in research until his death following a short illness. He died on 31 January 2004, in London, England.

== Selected publications ==
- Power, E. A. (1964). Introductory Quantum Electrodynamics. London: Longmans. ASIN B0006BN1C2. LCCN 65020006. OCLC 490279969.
- Edwin A. Power; John A. Wheeler (1957). "Thermal Geons". Reviews of Modern Physics. 29 (3): 480. Bibcode:1957RvMP...29..480P. doi:10.1103/RevModPhys.29.480.
- Edwin A. Power; Sigurd Zienau (1959). "Coulomb Gauge in Non-Relativistic Quantum Electro-Dynamics and the Shape of Spectral Line". Philosophical Transactions of the Royal Society A. 251 (999): 427–454. Bibcode:1959RSPTA.251..427P. doi:10.1098/rsta.1959.0008.
