= Sigurd Zienau =

British physicist (1921–1976)

- Born: c. 1921
- Died: 18 October 1976
- Education: Birkbeck College
- Known for: Theory of the polaron
- Scientific career
- Fields: Physicist
- Workplaces: University College London; University of Liverpool
- Academic advisors: Walter Heitler; Wolfgang Pauli; Herbert Fröhlich
- Doctoral students: Paul C. W. Davies; Hugh Osborn

Sigurd Zienau (1921–1976) was a physicist notable for the theory of the polaron.

== Education ==
His undergraduate studies were in mathematics at Birkbeck College. His further studies in physics were very much in the 'old school' European style at the time and he variously studied under Walter Heitler, Wolfgang Pauli, and Herbert Fröhlich.

While at University, Zienau was friends with Alfred Sohn-Rethel. Sohn-Rethel published a pamphlet about an incident where Zienau observed some rats stealing eggs.

== Career ==
In 1954, he became an ICI Fellow and lecturer at the University of Liverpool. Then in 1965, he became a Reader in Physics at University College London until his early death at the age of 55. As well as his work on polarons he is remembered for his insightful revisions of Walter Heitler's book Quantum Theory of Radiation and Nevill Francis Mott & Harrie Massey's book The Theory of Atomic Collisions.

== See also ==
- Polaron
- Edwin Power
- Walter Heitler
