= Atomic physics =

Field of physics that studies the atom

Atomic physics is the field of physics that studies atoms as an isolated system of electrons and an atomic nucleus. Atomic physics typically refers to the study of atomic structure and the interaction between atoms. It is primarily concerned with the way in which electrons are arranged around the nucleus and the processes by which these arrangements change. This comprises ions, neutral atoms and, unless otherwise stated, it can be assumed that the term atom includes ions.

The term atomic physics can be associated with nuclear power and nuclear weapons, due to the synonymous use of atomic and nuclear in standard English. Physicists distinguish between atomic physics—which deals with the atom as a system consisting of a nucleus and electrons—and nuclear physics, which studies nuclear reactions and special properties of atomic nuclei.

As with many scientific fields, strict delineation can be highly contrived and atomic physics is often considered in the wider context of atomic, molecular, and optical physics. As a result, atomic physics research groups are usually classified as such.

== Isolated atoms ==
Atomic physics primarily considers atoms in isolation. Atomic models will consist of a single nucleus that may be surrounded by one or more bound electrons. It is not concerned with the formation of molecules (although much of the physics is identical), nor does it examine atoms in a solid state as condensed matter. It is concerned with processes such as ionization and excitation by photons or collisions with atomic particles.

While modelling atoms in isolation may not seem realistic, if one considers atoms in a gas or plasma then the time-scales for atom-atom interactions are huge in comparison to the atomic processes that are generally considered. This means that the individual atoms can be treated as if each were in isolation, as the vast majority of the time they are. By this consideration, atomic physics provides the underlying theory in plasma physics and atmospheric physics, even though both deal with very large numbers of atoms.

== Electronic configuration ==
Electrons form notional shells around the nucleus. These are normally in a ground state but can be excited by the absorption of energy from light (photons), magnetic fields, or interaction with a colliding particle (typically ions or other electrons).

In the Bohr model, the transition of an electron with n=3 to the shell n=2 is shown, where a photon is emitted. An electron from shell (n=2) must have been removed beforehand by ionization

Electrons that populate a shell are said to be in a bound state. The energy necessary to remove an electron from its shell (taking it to infinity) is called the binding energy. Any quantity of energy absorbed by the electron in excess of this amount is converted to kinetic energy according to the conservation of energy. The atom is said to have undergone the process of ionization.

If the electron absorbs a quantity of energy less than the binding energy, it will be transferred to an excited state. After a certain time, the electron in an excited state will "jump" (undergo a transition) to a lower state. In a neutral atom, the system will emit a photon of the difference in energy, since energy is conserved.

If an inner electron has absorbed more than the binding energy (so that the atom ionizes), then a more outer electron may undergo a transition to fill the inner orbital. In this case, a visible photon or a characteristic X-ray is emitted, or a phenomenon known as the Auger effect may take place, where the released energy is transferred to another bound electron, causing it to go into the continuum. The Auger effect allows one to multiply ionize an atom with a single photon.

There are rather strict selection rules as to the electronic configurations that can be reached by excitation by light –however, there are no such rules for excitation by collision processes.

== History and developments ==
One of the earliest steps towards atomic physics was the recognition that matter was composed of atoms. It forms a part of the texts written in 6th century BC to 2nd century BC, such as those of Democritus or Vaiśeṣika Sūtra written by Kaṇāda. This theory was later developed in the modern sense of the basic unit of a chemical element by the British chemist and physicist John Dalton in the 18th century. At this stage, it was not clear what atoms were, although they could be described and classified by their properties (in bulk). The invention of the periodic system of elements by Dmitri Mendeleev was another great step forward.

The true beginning of atomic physics is marked by the discovery of spectral lines and attempts to describe the phenomenon, most notably by Joseph von Fraunhofer. The study of these lines led to the Bohr atom model and to the birth of quantum mechanics. In seeking to explain atomic spectra, an entirely new mathematical model of matter was revealed. As far as atoms and their electron shells were concerned, not only did this yield a better overall description, i.e. the atomic orbital model, but it also provided a new theoretical basis for chemistry (quantum chemistry) and spectroscopy.

Since the Second World War, both theoretical and experimental fields have advanced at a rapid pace. This can be attributed to progress in computing technology, which has allowed larger and more sophisticated models of atomic structure and associated collision processes. Similar technological advances in accelerators, detectors, magnetic field generation and lasers have greatly assisted experimental work.

Beyond the well-known phenomena which can be described with regular quantum mechanics chaotic processes can occur which need different descriptions.

== Significant atomic physicists ==
Pre quantum mechanics

- John Dalton
- Joseph von Fraunhofer
- William Prout
- Johannes Rydberg
- J. J. Thomson
- Ernest Rutherford
- Democritus
- Vaiśeṣika Sūtra

Post quantum mechanics

- Alexander Dalgarno
- David Bates
- Niels Bohr
- Max Born
- Clinton Joseph Davisson
- Paul A. M. Dirac
- Enrico Fermi
- Charlotte Froese Fischer
- Vladimir Fock
- Douglas Hartree
- Ernest M. Henley
- Ratko Janev
- Daniel Kleppner
- Harrie S. Massey
- Nevill Mott
- I. I. Rabi
- Norman Ramsey
- Mike Seaton
- John C. Slater
- George Paget Thomson

== See also ==
- Particle physics
- Isomeric shift
- Atomism
- Ionisation
- Quantum Mechanics
- Electron Correlation
- Quantum Chemistry
- Bound State

== Bibliography ==
- Will Raven (2025). Atomic Physics for Everyone. Springer Nature. doi:10.1007/978-3-031-69507-0. ISBN 978-3-031-69507-0.
- Sommerfeld, A. (1923) Atomic structure and spectral lines. (translated from German "Atombau und Spektrallinien" 1921), Dutton Publisher.
- Foot, CJ (2004). Atomic Physics. Oxford University Press. ISBN 978-0-19-850696-6.
- Smirnov, B.E. (2003) Physics of Atoms and Ions, Springer. ISBN 0-387-95550-X.
- Szász, L. (1992) The Electronic Structure of Atoms, John Willey & Sons. ISBN 0-471-54280-6.
- Herzberg, Gerhard (1979) [1945]. Atomic Spectra and Atomic Structure. New York: Dover. ISBN 978-0-486-60115-1.
- Bethe, H.A. & Salpeter E.E. (1957) Quantum Mechanics of One- and Two Electron Atoms. Springer.
- Born, M. (1937) Atomic Physics. Blackie & Son Limited.
- Cox, P.A. (1996) Introduction to Quantum Theory and Atomic Spectra. Oxford University Press. ISBN 978-0-19-855916-0
- Condon, E.U. & Shortley, G.H. (1935). The Theory of Atomic Spectra. Cambridge University Press. ISBN 978-0-521-09209-8.
- Cowan, Robert D. (1981). The Theory of Atomic Structure and Spectra. University of California Press. ISBN 978-0-520-03821-9.
- Lindgren, I. & Morrison, J. (1986). Atomic Many-Body Theory (Second ed.). Springer-Verlag. ISBN 978-0-387-16649-0.
