= Harrie Massey =

Australian mathematical physicist (1908–1983)

- Born: 16 May 1908; Invermay, Victoria, Australia
- Died: 27 November 1983 (aged 75); Esher, Surrey, England
- Education: University of Melbourne; University of Cambridge
- Awards: Hughes Medal (1955); Royal Medal (1958); Knight Bachelor (1960)
- Scientific career
- Fields: Physicist
- Workplaces: Cavendish Laboratory; Admiralty Mining Establishment; Radiation Laboratory; Queen's University of Belfast; University College London
- Thesis: The Collision of Material Particles (1932)
- Doctoral advisor: Ralph Fowler
- Doctoral students: Alexander Dalgarno; David Robert Bates; Ian Sloan; Alan Martin; Michael Seaton
- Other notable students: G.D. Allam

Sir Harrie Stewart Wilson Massey FRS (16 May 1908 – 27 November 1983) was an Australian mathematical physicist who worked primarily in the fields of atomic and atmospheric physics.

A graduate of the University of Melbourne and the University of Cambridge, where he earned his doctorate at the Cavendish Laboratory, Massey became an independent lecturer in Mathematical Physics at the Queen's University of Belfast in 1933. He was appointed Goldsmid Professor of Applied Mathematics at University College London, in 1938. During the Second World War, Massey worked at the Admiralty Research Laboratory, where he helped devise countermeasures for German magnetic naval mines, and at the Admiralty Mining Establishment in Havant, where he helped develop British naval mines. In 1943, Mark Oliphant persuaded the Admiralty to release Massey to work on the Manhattan Project. He joined Oliphant's British Mission at the Radiation Laboratory, where they worked on the electromagnetic isotope separation process. When Oliphant returned to Britain in 1945, Massey took over the Berkeley Mission.

Massey returned to University College London, in October 1945 to find it badly damaged by bombing, and the Mathematics Department in dingy temporary accommodation. In 1950 he was appointed Quain Professor of Physics and head of the University College London Physics Department. The department was merged with Astronomy in 1973, but he remained its head until he retired in 1975. Under his direction, the Physics Department was reoriented towards particle physics and upper atmosphere physics. He worked with the Woomera Rocket Range to develop British Skylark rocket, and was on the governing board of the Anglo-Australian Telescope. He was the chairman of the Committee on Space Research (COSPAR) from 1959 to 1978, and of its British national chapter. He was also the first chairman of the European Space Sciences Committee, and helped found the European Space Research Organization and the Mullard Space Science Laboratory at University College London.

== Early life ==
Harrie Stewart Wilson Massey was born in Invermay, Victoria, Australia, (Note: Bibliographical Memoirs of the Royal Society says he was born in St Kilda, Victoria, but the Australian Dictionary of Biography says Invermay, Victoria.) on 16 May 1908, the only child of Harrie Stewart Massey, a miner, and his wife Eleanor Elizabeth née Wilson. He grew up in the rural community of Hoddles Creek, and enrolled in the local state school in 1913. He received his Merit Certificate, normally awarded after completing the eighth grade, when he was nine, but due to his age he still had to stay there for another three years. He won a scholarship to University High School, and moved to Parkville with his mother in 1920. At University High School he was president of the Science Club and vice captain of the cricket team.

== Career ==
At the age of 16, Massey won a scholarship to the University of Melbourne, which he entered in 1925. He had thoughts of studying chemistry, but was impressed by the physics lectures given by Eric Hercus. This was a stroke of luck; first year physics lectures were normally given by Thomas Laby. Massey recalled in 1980 that "in a fairly wide experience I would rate [Laby] the worst lecturer I have heard". At the university he played cricket, billiards, tennis and baseball, which he played for the university. He was awarded his Bachelor of Arts (BSc) in physics with first class honours in 1928, and a Bachelor of Arts (BA) in mathematics in 1929. At a meeting of the Australasian Association for the Advancement of Science in Perth in August 1925, he met a schoolteacher, Jessica Elizabeth Bruce. They were married on 11 January 1928 at the district registrar's office in Perth. They had a daughter, Pamela Lois.

At that time, the university did not offer a Doctor of Philosophy (PhD) program so Massey undertook a Master of Science (MSc) course, with both experimental and theoretical components. The former, in cooperation with Courtney Mohr, dealt with soft X-ray deflection from metal surfaces; the latter with wave mechanics. This involved translating numerous articles from German journals such as Zeitschrift für Physik, Annalen der Physik and Physikalische Zeitschrift. His external examiner was Ralph Fowler from the University of Cambridge, who was Paul Dirac's PhD supervisor.

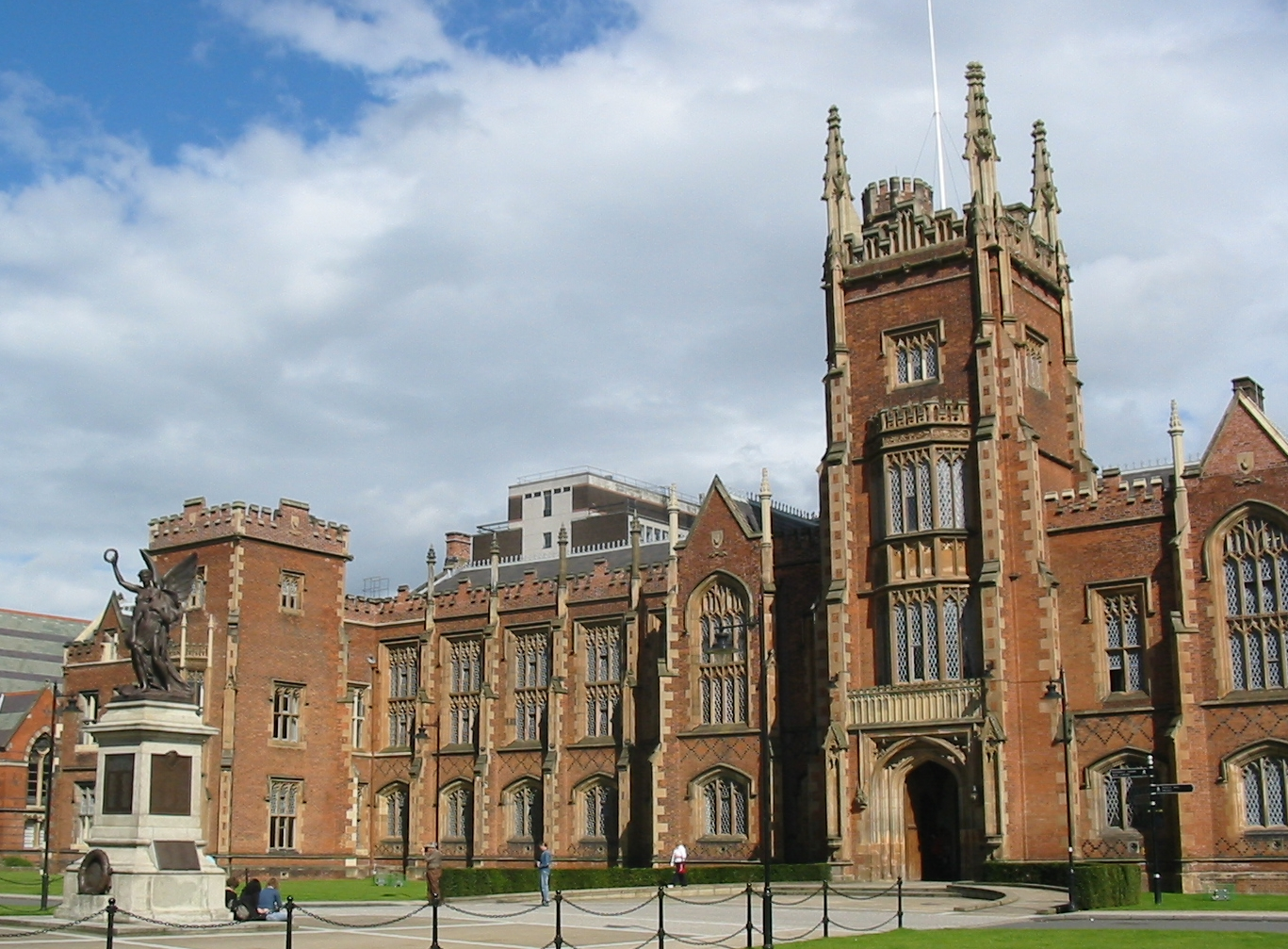
Queen's University, Belfast

In 1929, with the benefit of an Aitchison travelling scholarship from the University of Melbourne, Massey went to Trinity College, Cambridge to perform research at the Cavendish Laboratory led by Ernest Rutherford. The scholarship expired after two years, but he was awarded an 1851 Exhibition Scholarship in 1931. At this time the Cavendish Laboratory was one of the leading centres of physics in the world. In 1932, Cavendish laboratory scientists John Cockcroft and Ernest Walton split the atomic nucleus, James Chadwick discovered the neutron, and Patrick Blackett and Giuseppe Occhialini confirmed the existence of the positron.

Fowler was appointed as Massey's supervisor although it was clear that he did not need any supervision per se. Massey obtained his PhD on The Collisions of Material Particles in 1932. Shortly afterwards, he co-authored a book on atomic collision processes with Nevill Mott, Theory of Atomic Collisions (1933). He also applied the theory of collisions to models of neutron structure. At the Cavendish laboratory, he also played hockey with Cockcroft, and cricket for the Cavendish Cricket Club, becoming team captain in his final year there.

In June 1933, Massey became an independent lecturer in Mathematical Physics at the Queen's University of Belfast. He was the only member of the department until R. A. Buckingham arrived in 1934. Despite having to give nine lectures a week, he found time to write his second book, Negative Ions (1938), and began working on upper atmospheric physics. Frustrated with the tiresome and time-consuming process of calculation, he had his physics workshop superintendent, John Wylie, build him a small-scale differential analyzer, an analog computer that could solve differential equations, for just £50. This was used to solve problems related to low temperature helium, and the photo-ionisation of oxygen in the upper atmosphere.

Massey was appointed Goldsmid Professor of Applied Mathematics at University College London, in 1938, following the death of L. N. G. Filon the previous year. He brought with him Buckingham, now an 1851 Exhibition Scholar himself, and David Bates, a promising graduate student. They brought the differential analyser with them to London, where it was destroyed by an air raid during the Second World War.

== Second World War ==
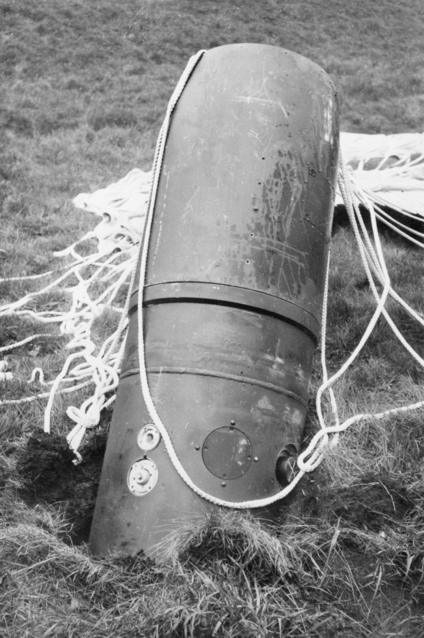
A German magnetic mine

Soon after the outbreak of World War II on 1 September 1939, the Germans began an airdropped naval mine campaign against Britain. The results were devastating. Nineteen ships totaling 59,027 tons were sunk by mines in October, and 27 totaling 120,958 tons in November, along with the destroyer HMS Blanche. Many more ships were damaged, including the cruiser HMS Belfast. The nature of the mines was initially unknown, but on 23 November 1939, a bomb disposal team under Lieutenant Commander J. G. D. Ouvry recovered an intact aerial mine from a mudflat at Shoeburyness, and the threat was revealed to be a magnetic mine.

In December 1939, Massey joined a group at the Admiralty Research Laboratory in Teddington led by Stephen Butterworth. They were soon joined by a number of other physicists, including Bates, Buckingham, Francis Crick and John Gunn. Together, they came up with a series of countermeasures that enable the Navy to successfully sweep the mines. With this in hand, Massey became deputy chief scientist to the Scientific Section of Mine Design Department at the Admiralty Mining Establishment in Havant in early 1941. This time, the job was to create mines as good as the German ones. Massey brought his team with him. While Bates worked on packaging to protect the mine when it was dropped from an aircraft, Buckingham and Gunn calculated its theoretical effectiveness, and Crick designed the circuitry. Their mine codenamed MX, was soon in service, and the group turned its attention to developing acoustic or pressure mines. On the retirement of A. B. Wood in 1943, Massey became chief scientist at Havant.

After the August 1943 Quebec Agreement merged the British and American atomic bomb projects, Mark Oliphant persuaded the Admiralty to release Massey to work on the Manhattan Project. In November 1943, Massey set out with Oliphant for the Radiation Laboratory at the University of California, Berkeley in a B-24 Liberator bomber. The Radiation Laboratory's part was to develop an electromagnetic isotope separation process. Massey was in charge of its Theoretical Group, which included American David Bohm and Australian Eric Burhop. They studied the characteristics of electric discharges in magnetic fields, today known as Bohm diffusion, and studied the ionization of uranium compounds used as feed in the electromagnetic uranium enrichment process such as uranium tetrachloride (UCl_{4}) and uranium hexafluoride (UF_{6}). Oliphant returned to Britain in March 1945, and was replaced as head of the British mission in Berkeley by Massey. Wartime papers produced by the group were collected and published in The Characteristics of Electrical Discharges in Magnetic Fields (1949).

== Later life ==
Massey returned to University College London, in October 1945 to find it badly damaged by bombing, and the Mathematics Department in dingy temporary accommodation. He was allowed to pick his own lecturers, so he chose Bates, Burhop, Buckingham and Gunn. While they had to teach mathematics, they were free to choose their own research topics, so they chose to research physics, carrying out physical experiments. This situation lasted until 1950, when Edward Andrade retired, and Massey was appointed Quain Professor of Physics and head of the University College London, Physics Department. The department was merged with Astronomy in 1973, but he remained its head until he retired in 1975. He also served as University College London's Vice-Provost from 1969 to 1973.

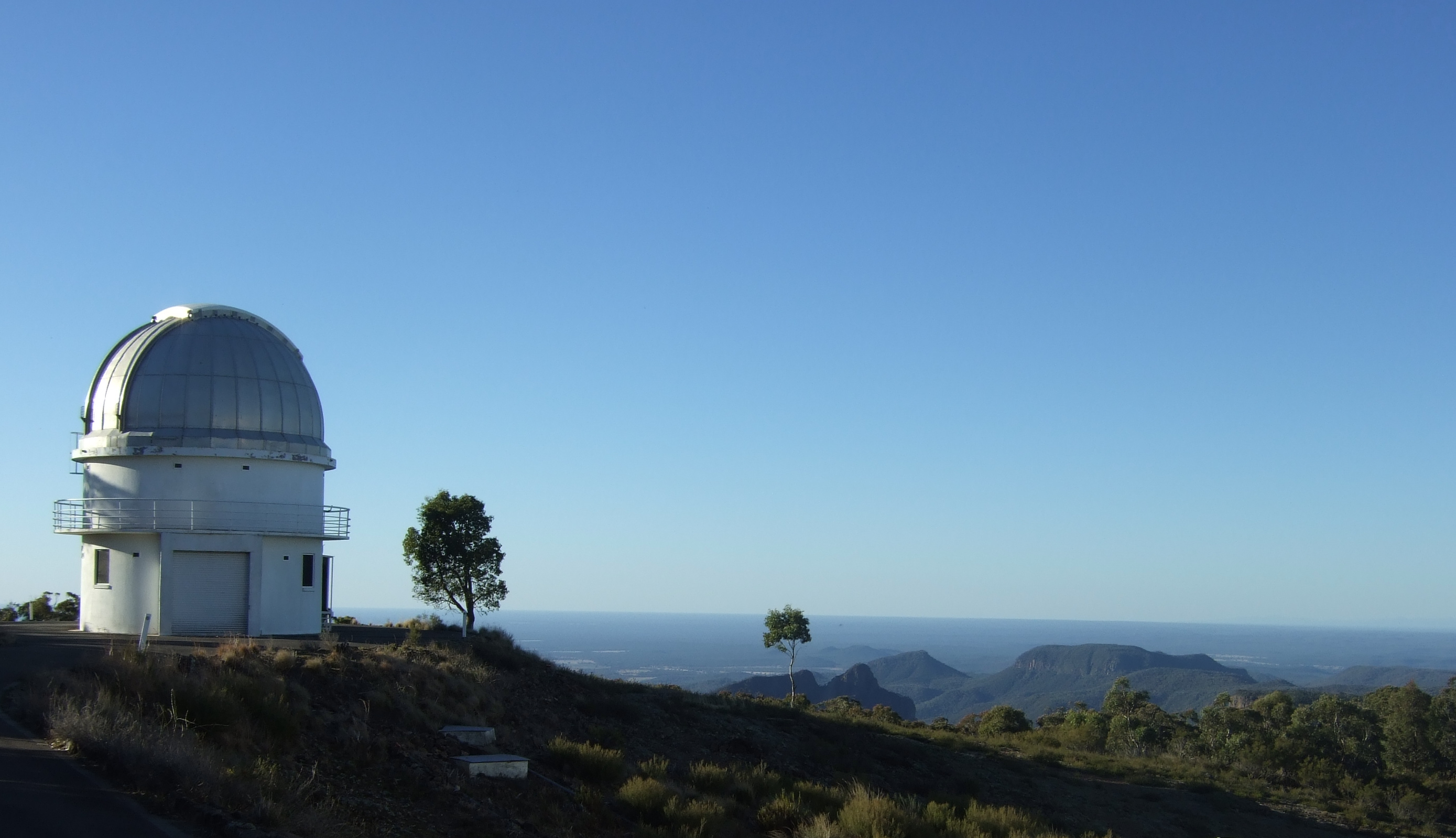
The 40" telescope dome at Siding Spring Observatory, New South Wales.

When Massey took over the Physics Department, most of his physicists, including Bates, Buckingham, Burhop and Robert Boyd, moved with him. Like the Mathematics Department, it was still in temporary accommodation owing to bomb damage during the war. A new building was under construction, but to develop the technical infrastructure, Massey hired Harry Tomlinson, who had worked for him in the British Mission in Berkeley. The department acquired several accelerators, including a 20 MeV synchrotron from the Atomic Energy Authority. Dick Jennings and Franz Heymann built two microtrons. Under Massey, the Physics Department moved away from researching the physics of metals and liquids, and focused on particle physics and upper atmosphere physics. Massey saw the potential of computers. He arranged with Andrew Booth for a copy of his All Purpose Electronic Computer, and recruited two programmers, Joan Lawson and Jane Wallace. When the University of London established a computing unit, Buckingham left to head it.

Elected a Fellow of the Royal Society of London in 1940, Massey was awarded its Hughes Medal in 1955, and its Royal Medal in 1958. He was a member of its council from 1949 to 1951 and again from 1959 to 1960, before serving as its physical secretary and vice-president from 1969 to 1978. He became a member of the Department of Scientific and Industrial Research's Nuclear Physics Sub-Committee in 1956. When the National Institute for Research in Nuclear Science was founded in 1957, he became one of the initial members of its governing board. He became a member of the Research Grants Committee in 1959, and was chairman of the Council for Scientific Policy from 1965 to 1970. He was knighted for his services in 1960. He was also a member of both the American Philosophical Society and the United States National Academy of Sciences.

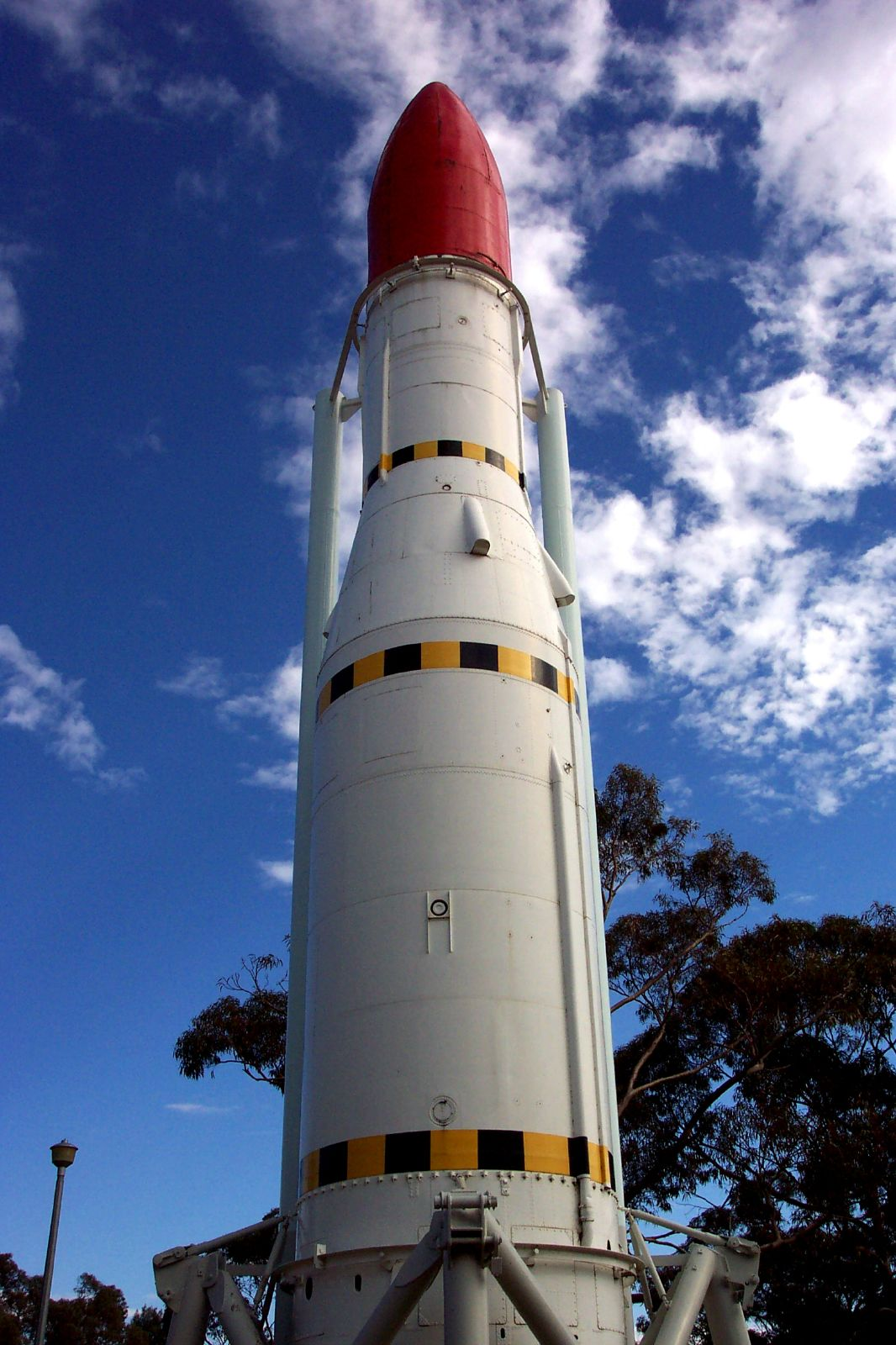
A Black Arrow launch vehicle in the rocket park at Woomera, South Australia, similar to the one that launched the only satellite launched with a British launcher

Rockets had seen enormous development for military purposes during the Second World War, and Massey saw their potential for studying the upper atmosphere. He became a major supporter of space science, and wrote a book on the subject, History of British Space Science (1984). He was the chairman of the Committee on Space Research (COSPAR), which was established by the International Council of Scientific Unions, from its founding in 1959 until 1978, and also of the British National Committee for Space Research, its British national chapter. He was also the first chairman of the European Space Sciences Committee, and helped found the European Space Research Organization and the Mullard Space Science Laboratory at University College London.

Space science also gave Massey an excuse to visit Australia; he made some twenty trips. He was involved in the testing of balloons for upper atmosphere research at the University of Melbourne's site in Mildura, Victoria. As chairman of the Rocket Subcommittee of the Royal Society's Gassiot Committee, he visited the Weapons Research Establishment near Adelaide and the Woomera Rocket Range to discuss collaboration on the British Skylark rocket, which was test fired from Woomera in 1957. He sought to develop a UK space program in cooperation in space with Australia, the United States and European countries. He was successful in building international cooperation, although his Black Knight project was cancelled in favour of Black Arrow, which launched Prospero, the only satellite launched with a British launch vehicle, from Woomera in 1971. He was involved in the negotiations leading to the establishment of the Anglo-Australian Telescope at Siding Spring Mountain in New South Wales. He was a United Kingdom member and deputy chairman of the telescope's governing board from 1975 to 1980, and chairman from 1980 to 1983.

Massey received honorary doctorates from both Queens University Belfast (1955) and Heriot-Watt University (1975).

== Death and legacy ==
After a long illness, Massey died at his home in Esher, Surrey, which Jessica had named "Kalamunda", from the Australian Aboriginal word for the area in Western Australia where she had once lived, on 27 November 1983. He was survived by his wife and daughter. The Royal Society/COSPAR Massey Award is named after him, as is the Harrie Massey Lecture Theatre and Harrie Massey Prize at University College London, and the Harrie Massey Medal and Prize, jointly awarded by the Australian Institute of Physics and British Institute of Physics. His papers are in the University College London archives.

Hoddles Creek Primary School, the state school attended by Massey during his childhood, named Massey House (one of the school's four houses) in his honour. A pine tree planted by Massey on the school grounds in 1937 remains, as well as a plaque commemorating Massey's achievements.

== Bibliography ==
- Mott, N. F.; Massey, Harrie Stewart Wilson (1933). Theory of Atomic Collisions. Oxford: Clarendon Press. OCLC 537272.
- Massey, Harrie Stewart Wilson (1938). Negative Ions. Cambridge: Cambridge University Press. OCLC 251611666.
- Massey, Harrie Stewart Wilson; Kestelman, H (1958). Ancillary Mathematics. London: Sir Isaac Pitman and Sons Ltd. OCLC 10396901.
- Massey, Harrie Stewart Wilson (1956). Atoms and Energy. New York: Philosophical Library. OCLC 2337212.
- Massey, Harrie Stewart Wilson; Boyd, R. L. F. (1958). The Upper Atmosphere. London: Hutchinson. OCLC 511957.
- Massey, Harrie Stewart Wilson (1966). The New Age in Physics. New York: Harper. OCLC 530595.
- Massey, Harrie Stewart Wilson; Quinton, Arthur Robert (1961). Basic Laws of Matter. Bronxville, New York: Herald Books. OCLC 1347311.
- Massey, Harrie Stewart Wilson (1964). Space Physics. Cambridge, England: University Press. OCLC 340105.
- Massey, Harrie Stewart Wilson; Mott, N. F. (1965). The Theory of Atomic Collisions. Oxford: Clarendon Press. OCLC 537272.
- Massey, Harrie Stewart Wilson (1966). Space Travel and Exploration. London: Taylor & Francis. OCLC 2423098.
- Massey, Harrie Stewart Wilson (1976). Negative Ions. Cambridge: Cambridge University Press. ISBN 978-0-521-20775-1. OCLC 2339571.
- Massey, Harrie Stewart Wilson (1979). Atomic and Molecular Collisions. London: Taylor & Francis. ISBN 978-0-470-26742-4. OCLC 4832392.
- Massey, Harrie Stewart Wilson (1982). Applied Atomic Physics Processes. Academic Press. ISBN 0-12-419951-8.
- Massey, Harrie Stewart Wilson; Robins, Malcolm Owen (1986). History of British space science. Cambridge University Press. ISBN 0-521-30783-X.
