= Mullard Space Science Laboratory =

British university space research group

- Formation: 1966
- Location: Holmbury St Mary, United Kingdom
- Coordinates: 51°10′18.6″N 0°25′14.8″W
- Director: Andrew Fazakerley
- Parent organization: University College London
- Website: ucl.ac.uk/mssl

The UCL Mullard Space Science Laboratory (MSSL) is the largest university-based space research group in the UK. MSSL is part of the Department of Space and Climate Physics at University College London (UCL), one of the first universities in the world to conduct space research. Since its establishment, as of July 2025, MSSL has participated in 71 satellite missions, ten of which remain in operation, and with seven more in development. It has also participated in more than 200 sounding rocket experiments.

It takes its name from Mullard Limited, and is located in Holmbury St Mary in the Surrey Hills National Landscape, near the town of Dorking in the county of Surrey, England.

== History ==
In 1957 Sir Harrie Massey of UCL directed the first Skylark rocket experiments. In 1962 Massey led a team from UCL, Imperial College London, the University of Birmingham and the University of Leicester that developed many of the instruments on Ariel 1, the world's first multinational spacecraft. By 1966 the demands had outgrown the laboratory space available in London and Massey asked his colleague Robert Boyd to set up a laboratory, with generous funding from the British electronics company, Mullard, which had helped to set up the Mullard Radio Astronomy Observatory (MRAO) at the University of Cambridge.

At that time, Boyd was the leading British researcher in space science. Joint funding from Mullard and UCL led to the expansion of his research programme and resulted in the creation of the Mullard Space Science Laboratory (MSSL) in 1966. Dedicated premises were selected near Dorking, Surrey in an oak-panelled house at Holmbury St Mary, set in beautiful grounds, where the laboratory has been based ever since.

By this time the UCL group had been involved in providing instrumentation for over 100 rocket launches, mainly from the Woomera Test Range in Australia, but with the recent founding of the European Space Research Organisation (ESRO), with Massey as chairman, they were increasing involved with European as well as American projects. They produced the electron spectrometer for NASA's Cassini mission, the spectrometer for ESA's Herschel Space Observatory and the UV/Optical Telescope for the Swift Gamma Ray Burst Explorer.

== MSSL Research Groups ==
Scientific research groups at MSSL are split into two primary areas: Astrophysics, and Solar System groups, complemented by the Instrumentation/Technology Innovation groups that work on space hardware.

=== Astrophysics ===
In synergy with space science missions, members of the astrophysics group actively work on a wide range of astronomy and astrophysics topics.

=== Solar System ===
Using data from spacecraft throughout the Solar System, MSSL's Solar System groups carry out research into the Sun, Earth and planetary bodies.

==== Climate Extremes ====
The group's main foci are the prediction and monitoring of worldwide weather and climate extremes.

==== Planetary Science ====
This group's science themes are planetary magnetospheres, moon interactions, surfaces and comets studying planetary systems across the Solar System and beyond.

==== Solar Physics ====
The group works on several solar physics hardware projects, mostly relating to fabricating instruments that work at ultra-violet and X-ray wavelengths, and studying the data that they return.

==== Space Plasma Physics ====
This research group studies the physical interaction between the Earth and the Sun and the fundamental physics of space plasmas

==== Imaging ====
Developing enabling imaging technologies and corresponding datasets to allow new scientific understanding with applications centred on space and climate physics.

=== Instrumentation/Technology Innovation ===
New technologies and advances in instrumentation through research enable the design and build of scientific space instruments.

== MSSL Facilities ==
=== Solar UK Research Facility (SURF) ===
As a part of the research undertaken within the Solar & Stellar Physics group, SURF collaborates with Yohkoh, SOHO/CDS, and TRACE to produce CHIANTI The CHIANTI package is freely available to all researchers subject to the condition of proper acknowledgement in all resulting publications.

=== The Grid ===
The European Grid of Solar Observations (EGSO) is a project funded by the European Commission under its Fifth Framework Programme. EGSO uses Grid technology to create the fabric of a virtual solar observatory. MSSL is involved in three components of the Grid.

- AstroGrid: As part of the UK e-Science Initiative, UCL-MSSL is responsible for servicing as a repository for solar data from AstroGrid. Astrophysical and solar-terrestrial data are held elsewhere in the UK.
- GRIDSTART: In order to encourage collaboration between the Grid projects that the European Commission is funding, a cluster has been created under the GRIDSTART Accompanying Measure project. EGSO is one of the founding partners of GRIDSTART.
- UCL Grid: As part of University College London, MSSL is also involved in UCL Grid activities.

=== Technology Management Group (TMG) ===
TMG offers research facilities and consultancy to support the development, management and exploitation of technology within an enterprise context through two main centres.

- UCL Centre for Systems Engineering (UCLse) works with the UCL Departments of Biochemical Engineering, Chemical Engineering Computer Science, Electronic and Electrical Engineering, and Mechanical Engineering to bring together expertise to develop systems engineering research, teaching and technology transfer.
- Centre for Advanced Instrumentation Systems (CAIS) was formed in 1993 to promote and encourage interaction between Industry and Researchers at UCL working in the area of Advanced Instrumentation. It provides a base for the Postgraduate Training Partnership with Sira, has designed and implemented an MRes Course in Instrumentation, has introduced an MSc in Applied Instrumentation, and, in collaboration with the Centre for Systems Engineering, has created an MSc Course in Systems Engineering Management. In the commercial field, CAIS has formed the Specialised Instrumentation Group which has about thirty small and medium-sized companies as members, providing seminars and forums covering topics of interest. CAIS also manages the University College London KTP Centre, and co-ordinates postgraduate training for a number of Faraday Partnerships.

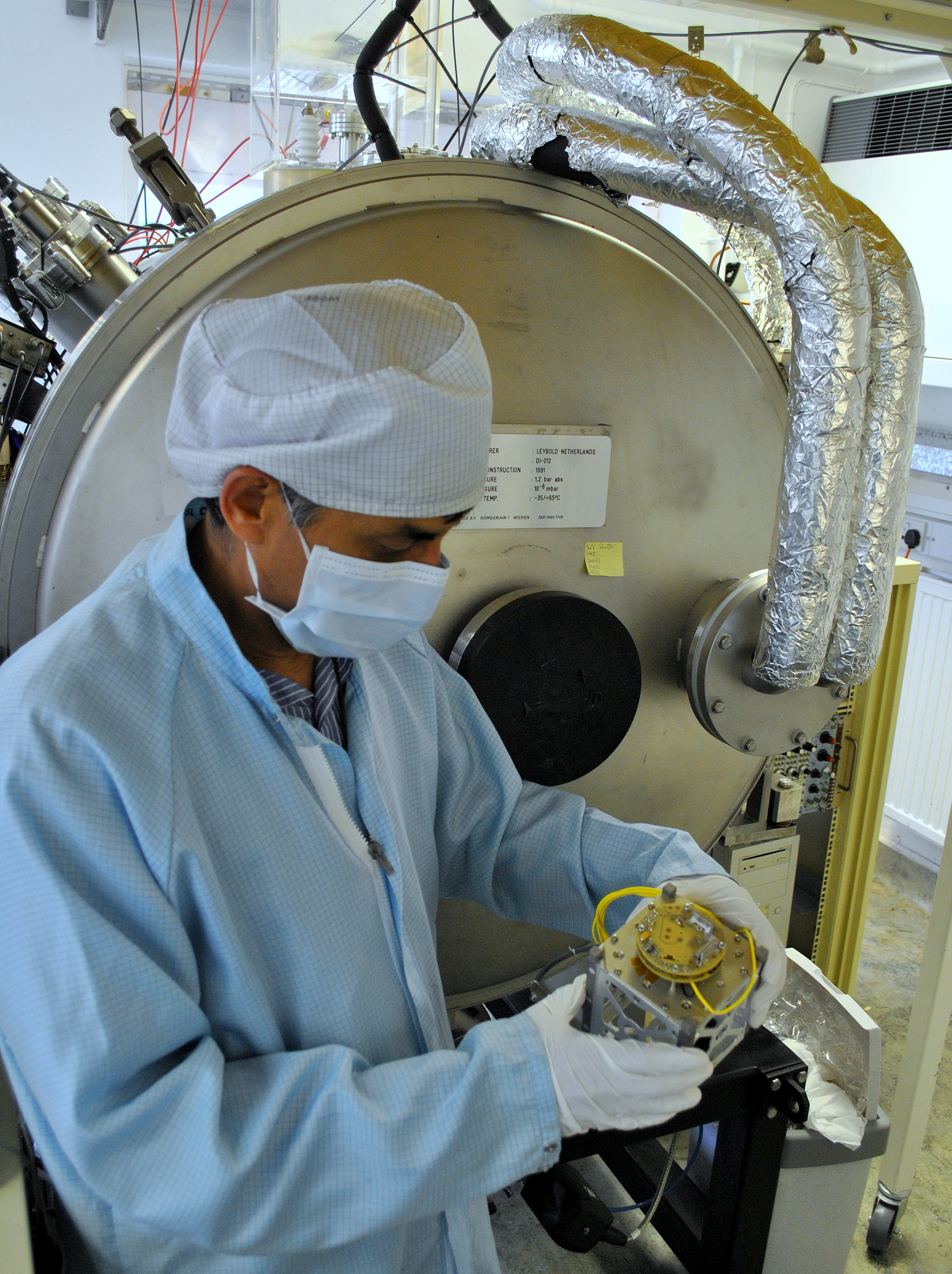
Scientist holding a CubeSat in front of MSSL's thermal vacuum facility

=== Smart Optics ===
The Smart Optics Faraday Partnership is an active network of more than 100 businesses and academic groups with the common aim of generating new enabling optical technologies and successfully applying them commercially in a diverse range of markets. Smart Optics working on such products as the Smart Ophthalmoscope, illuminated retail signage, and ultra precision surfaces. Faraday Partnerships are intended to promote improved interaction between UK research institutions and industry.

=== Test facilities ===
The MSSL Mechanical engineering group operates a number of test facilities which include a vacuum bakeout facility, thermal vacuum facility, a vibration facility, a cleanroom facility, Laser and Sputter coating facility, a Westbond wire bonding facility, ultrasonic cleaning facilities, and a mechanical engineering workshop.

== MSSL participation in space missions ==
Since it was formed, the MSSL has worked on a number of different solar physics hardware projects. Its earliest involvement came with an experiment on Ariel 1 that made the first spectroscopic X-ray observations of solar flares. Other instruments were later flown on the OSO-4, ESRO-II, OSO-5, and OSO-6 missions. Instruments built have also flown on the Solar Maximum Mission, the Coronal Helium Abundance Spacelab Experiment (CHASE) which was part of the Spacelab-2 missions. More recently, MSSL has played a significant role in the Swift mission. MSSL engineers participated in building and testing the Ultraviolet Optical Telescope (UVOT) instrument on Swift.

MSSL has participated in the Hinode and STEREO missions. For Hinode, MSSL led a consortium building the EUV Imaging Spectrometer (EIS) which provides plasma diagnostic in the solar chromosphere, transition region and corona.

== Collaborative agencies ==
- NASA - Ultraviolet, Visible and Gravitational Astrophysics (USA)
- NASA - Applied Information Systems Research Program (USA)
- NASA - Living With a Star (USA)
- Chandra Emission Line Project (USA)
- Agenzia Spaziale Italiana (ASI, Italy)
- MUIR, Ministero dell'Istruzione dell'Universita' e della Ricerca
