= Geon (physics) =

Wave held together through gravitational attraction

In general relativity, a geon is a nonsingular electromagnetic or gravitational wave which is held together in a confined region by the gravitational attraction of its own field energy. They were first investigated theoretically in 1955 by J. A. Wheeler, who coined the term as a contraction of "gravitational electromagnetic entity".

== Overview ==
Since general relativity is a classical field theory, Wheeler's concept of a geon does not treat them as quantum-mechanical entities, and this generally remains true today. Nonetheless, Wheeler speculated that there might be a relationship between geons and elementary particles. This idea continues to attract some attention among physicists, but in the absence of a viable theory of quantum gravity, the accuracy of this speculative idea cannot be tested.

Wheeler did not present explicit geon solutions to the vacuum Einstein field equation, a gap which was partially filled by Dieter R. Brill and James Hartle in 1964 by the Brill–Hartle geon. In 1997, Anderson and Brill gave a rigorous proof that geon solutions of the vacuum Einstein equation exist, though they are not given in a simple closed form.

A major outstanding question regarding geons is whether they are stable, or must decay over time as the energy of the wave gradually "leaks" away. This question has not yet been definitively answered, but the consensus seems to be that they probably cannot be stable. This would lay to rest Wheeler's initial hope that a geon might serve as a classical model for stable elementary particles. However, this would not rule out the possibility that geons are stabilized by quantum effects. In fact, a quantum generalization of the gravitational geon using low-energy quantum gravity shows that geons are stable systems even when quantum effects are turned on. The quantum geon (called "graviball") is described as gravitons bound by their gravitational self-interaction. Since geons (classical or quantum) have a mass but are electromagnetically neutral, they are possible candidates for dark matter.

== See also ==
- Black hole electron
- Edwin Power
- Geometrodynamics
- Kugelblitz
- Quantum foam
