= Tom Gaskell =

British oceanographer and geophysicist

Thomas Gaskell
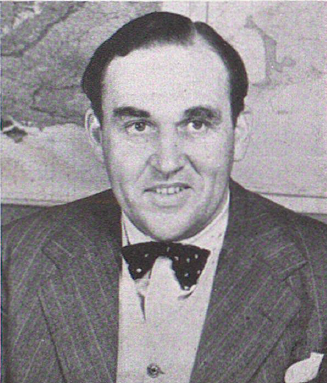
- Gaskell in December 1953
- Born: Thomas Frohock Gaskell; 26 January 1916
- Died: 1995
- Education: Cambridge University (Ph.D., 1940)
- Known for: Combined Operations Headquarters Challenger Deep
- Scientific career
- Fields: Oceanographer; Geophysicist

Thomas Frohock Gaskell (January 26, 1916 - 1995), or T. F. Gaskell, was a British oceanographer and geophysicist. He is known for his work relating to the seabed, currents, and the ocean's influence on climate, and for his role in the discovery of Challenger Deep.

== Education ==
Gaskell attended Cambridge University on a scholarship, studying physics under Ernest Rutherford and, on Rutherford's recommendation, working as a research assistant to Edward Bullard. He received a PhD in 1940.

== Career ==
=== Wartime intelligence ===
During World War II, Gaskell advised the Admiralty Mining Establishment of the Royal Navy on anti-mine counter-measures, alongside Robert Boyd, Francis Crick and other recent science graduates. Journalist Anthony Michaelis has described how, despite an air raid on their facility,

the great brilliance of this remarkable group of young scientists began to tell and they moved rapidly ahead. When one day the Germans laid their latest and to them unbeatable mine, combining acoustic and magnetic trigger mechanisms, the team had forestalled them, and were able immediately to hand sweeping instructions to the crews.

As Britain prepared its offensive against German-occupied Europe, Gaskell joined the Combined Operations Headquarters, advising on beach intelligence and bombardment. Days after Operation Overlord began,

Gaskell had the highly gratifying, but by no means un-dangerous, job of walking the beaches of Normandy and verifying his predictions by making actual measurements of the diameters of mine craters.

=== Persian oilfields ===
From 1946 to 1949, Gaskell was Chief Petroleum Physicist for the Anglo-Iranian Petroleum Company, which succeeded the Anglo-Persian Oil Company and later became British Petroleum. He was based in Masjed Soleyman.

=== Atlantic surveying ===
In 1949, Gaskell along with oceanographer John Swallow and geophysicist Maurice Hill experimented with explosives as sound sources for marine surveying. The experiments were conducted from OWS Weather Explorer in the North Atlantic, under the auspices of Cambridge's Department of Geodesy and Geophysics (now the Department of Earth Sciences).

=== Challenger expedition ===
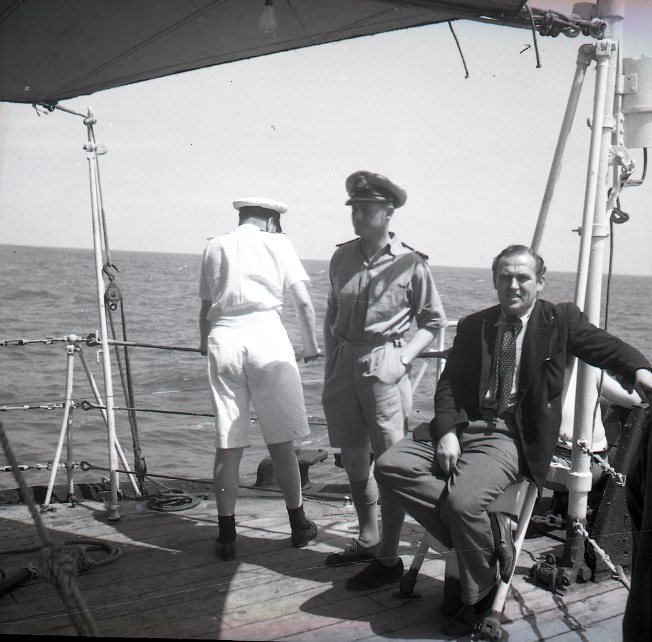
Gaskell, right, aboard HMS Challenger II

Between 1950 and 1952, Gaskell served as Chief Scientist on the worldwide oceanographic expedition of HMS Challenger. His team included Swallow and Hill. Their mission was to confirm the theory of continental drift and plate tectonics; an ulterior purpose was to test for fallout from recent nuclear explosions.

==== Mariana Trench ====
The expedition is renowned for having identified the record-setting depth of what is now called Challenger Deep, the deepest point in the oceans. George Stephen Ritchie, captain of HMS Challenger, recalled:

On the way south from Japan to Manus, Dr. Gaskell had said that he wished to carry out one of his seismic experiments in a deep trench in order to find out something of the structure of the sea-floor in such an area. So, as the ship moved into the Marianas Trench between Guam and Ulithi, John Swallow was active with the seismic gear [...] The soundings rapidly increased and soon Swallow was reporting over 5000 fathoms and finally 5663 fathoms.

At that point the echo-sounder failed in the unprecedented depth, forcing Gaskell's team to improvise. Gaskell recounted the result:

A heavy iron weight (140 lb.) was lowered over the stern on thin steel piano wire [...] it took from ten past five in the evening until twenty to seven, that is an hour and a half, for the iron weight to fall to the sea-bottom. It was almost dark by the time the weight struck, but great excitement greeted the reading of 5,944 fathoms [10,870 m] for the wire paid out.

==== Funafuti (Tuvalu) ====
Among Challenger's many ports of call, Funafuti atoll features prominently in the associated memoirs. Gaskell recalled projecting a Western film for the inhabitants, who had never seen horses and laughed at the sight of them, while Ritchie explained that Challenger's arrival harkened back to an earlier scientific expedition to Funafuti, led by William Sollas for the Royal Society in 1896:

An old man remembered the coming of the scientists of the Coral Investigation Committee 50 years before, and he led Dr. Gaskell to the site of the deep borehole, the mouth of the hole being still visible but choked with vegetation.

=== British Petroleum ===
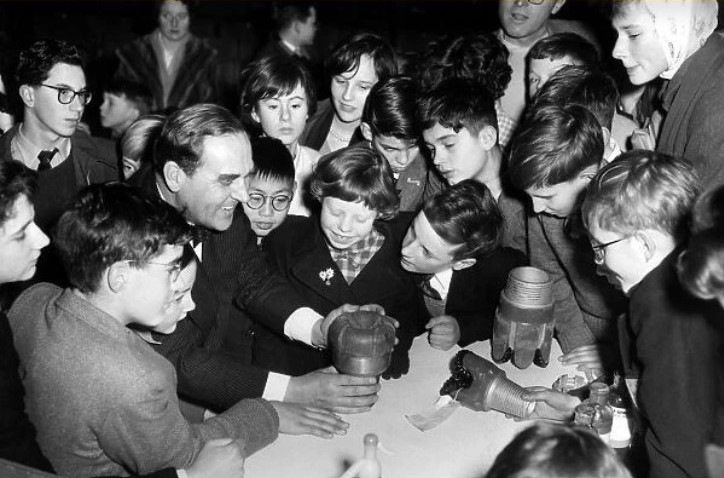
Gaskell, centre-left, after delivering the annual Christmas lecture, Royal Geographical Society, London, 1960.

Gaskell subsequently worked for British Petroleum, as Senior Physicist in the Exploration Department. He appeared regularly on radio and television and published and lectured widely.

=== Climate change ===
In 1979, Gaskell warned of "the temperature rise due to the burning of fossil fuels", adding:

[t]he need in climate research is also interdisciplinary, and a start has already been made with extensive meteorological and oceanographical experiments to determine some of the exchanges that occur between sea and air, which clearly affect weather and climate.

== Legacy ==
Gaskell died in 1995. He is commemorated by Gaskell Ridge, an undersea feature in the Indian Ocean.

== Selected works ==
=== Books ===
- 1957: Seismic Results in Relation to the Andesiteline
- 1960: Under the Deep Oceans: Twentieth Century Voyages of Discovery, New York, Norton
- 1961: The Earth Today (with Alan H. Cook), Royal Astronomical Society
- 1964: World Beneath the Oceans
- 1966: North Sea Oil—the Great Gamble (with Bryan Cooper)
- 1967: The Earth's Mantle
- 1968: The History of the Gulf Stream
- 1970: Physics of the Earth
- 1970: Using the oceans
- 1970: Is a New Ice Age Beginning?
- 1972: The Gulf Stream
- 1976: The Adventure of North Sea Oil (with Bryan Cooper)
- 1979: World climate: The weather, the environment, and man (with Martin Morris)
- 2013: Geophysics in the Affairs of Man (with Charles C. Bates and Robert B. Rice)
