= Ariel 4 =

Atmospheric research satellite

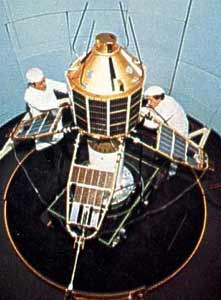
- Ariel 4.
- Names: Ariel4, UK 4
- Mission type: Ionospheric
- Operator: SERC / NASA
- COSPAR ID: 1971-109A
- SATCAT no.: 5675
- Mission duration: 1 year (design life)

Spacecraft properties
- Manufacturer: BAC
- Launch mass: 99.5 kilograms (219 lb)

Start of mission
- Launch date: 11 December 1971, 20:47:01 UTC
- Rocket: Scout B-1-F S183C
- Launch site: Vandenberg SLC-5
- Contractor: NASA

End of mission
- Decay date: 12 December 1978

Orbital parameters
- Reference system: Geocentric
- Regime: Low Earth
- Eccentricity: 0.00795
- Perigee altitude: 473 kilometres (294 mi)
- Apogee altitude: 590 kilometres (370 mi)
- Inclination: 82.9 degrees
- Period: 95.26 minutes
- Epoch: 10 January 1972

Ariel 4, known pre-launch as UK 4, was a British ionospheric research satellite, which was operated by the Science and Engineering Research Council. It was launched 11 December 1971, aboard an American Scout rocket. Experiments were designed to meet one scientific objective, making it the first mission-oriented satellite for the UK. It was also the first satellite in the Ariel programme to contain an American experiment. Ariel 4 decayed from orbit on 12 December 1978

== Design ==
=== Development ===
Ariel 4 leveraged both the design and hardware of Ariel 3 to reduce costs. Ariel 4 used pieces of its predecessor's flight backup unit and spare parts. The satellite cost about 1.25 million pounds.

=== Operation ===
British Aircraft Corporation was the prime contractor. Ariel 4 had a launch mass of 101 kilograms (223 lb). It was the first satellite in the Ariel programme to be able to perform attitude maneuvers.

=== Sensors ===
It was the first satellite of the Ariel programme to have a mission-orientated payload, where all of the experiments are designed to research one scientific objective. The scientific objective was to "...study the interaction between high energy charged particles and electromagnetic radiation in the upper ionsphere and magnetosphere. Three of the five experiments on Ariel 3 were to determine a single scientific objective, so those three were improved for use on Ariel 4 and an additional experiment was added.

Experiments accounted for 18.5 kilograms (41 lb) of the spacecraft's mass.

It was also the first in the program to carry an American experiment.

== Mission ==
=== Launch ===
The launch of Ariel 4 occurred at 20:47:01 GMT on 11 December 1971, from Space Launch Complex 5 at the Vandenberg Air Force Base. It was conducted by NASA, using a Scout B-1 rocket.

=== Operations ===
Ariel 4 was placed into a low Earth orbit, with a perigee of 473 kilometres (294 mi), an apogee of 590 kilometres (370 mi), 82.9 degrees of inclination and an orbital period of 95.3 minutes as of 10 January 1972. It decayed from orbit on 12 December 1978.
