= David Bates (physicist) =

Irish physicist

- Born: 18 November 1916; Omagh, County Tyrone, Ireland
- Died: 5 January 1994 (aged 77); Belfast, Northern Ireland
- Education: Queen's University of Belfast
- Awards: Hughes Medal (1970); The Chree Medal and Prize (1973)
- Scientific career
- Fields: Physicist
- Workplaces: Admiralty Mining Establishment; University College London; Queen's University of Belfast
- Doctoral advisor: Harrie Massey
- Doctoral students: Michael J. Seaton, John T. Lewis, Derrick Crothers

Sir David Robert Bates FRS (18 November 1916 – 5 January 1994) was a Northern Irish mathematician and physicist.

Born in Omagh, County Tyrone, Ireland, he moved to Belfast with his family in 1925, attending the Royal Belfast Academical Institution. He enrolled with the Queen's University of Belfast in 1934. In 1939 he became a research student under Harrie Massey.

During the Second World War he worked at the Admiralty Mining Establishment where he developed methods of protecting ships from magnetically activated mines.

Working at University College London from 1945 until 1951, he then returned once more to the Queen's University, Belfast where he founded the Department of Applied Mathematics and Theoretical Physics. Although he officially retired in 1982 he continued to work in the department as an emeritus professor until his death.

His contributions to science include seminal works on atmospheric physics, molecular physics and the chemistry of interstellar clouds. He was knighted in 1978 for his services to science, was a Fellow of the Royal Society and a member and then vice-president of the Royal Irish Academy. In 1970 he won the Hughes Medal. He was elected a Foreign Honorary Member of the American Academy of Arts and Sciences in 1974.

Bates was a lifelong advocate of peace and a non-sectarian Northern Ireland. He was a founding member of the Alliance Party of Northern Ireland. He was married to Barbara Morris in 1956 and they had two children.

The Mathematics Building at Queens University Belfast, is named after him.

Two scientific awards have been created in his honour; the David Bates Medal of the European Geophysical Society is awarded yearly for outstanding contributions to planetary and solar system science, and the Institute of Physics have the David Bates Prize, awarded in even dated years, for distinguished achievement in atomic, molecular, optical and plasma physics.

== See also ==
- Alexander Dalgarno
- Atomic physics
- Molecular physics
