= Ariel 1 =

First British satellite

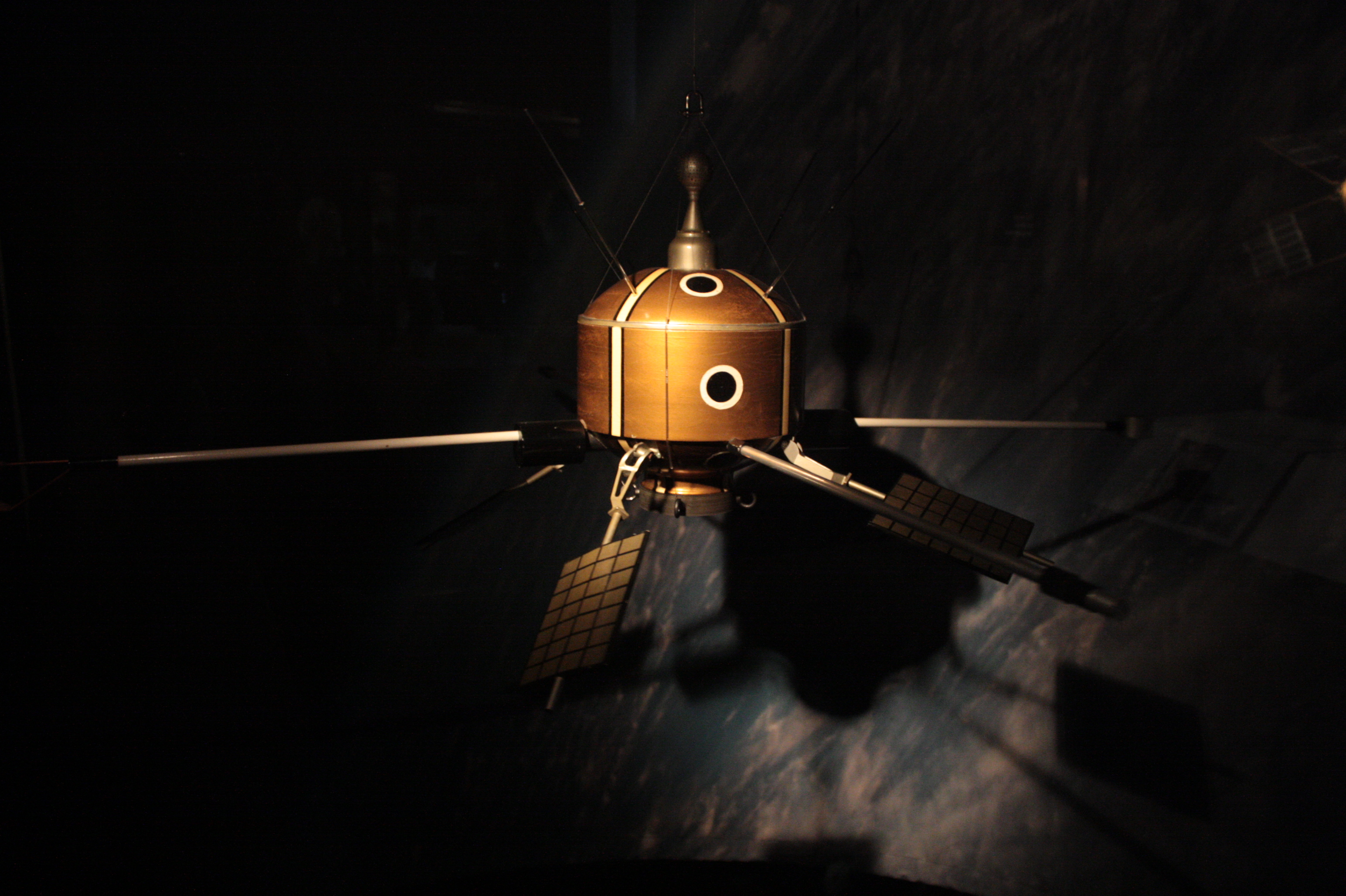
- Scale model of Ariel 1 satellite, London Science Museum
- Names: 1962 Omicron 1, Ariel1, S 51, UK1
- Mission type: Ionospheric
- Operator: SERC / NASA
- Harvard designation: 1962 Omicron 1
- COSPAR ID: 1962-015A
- SATCAT no.: 285

Spacecraft properties
- Manufacturer: Goddard Space Flight Center
- Launch mass: 62 kilograms (137 lb)

Start of mission
- Launch date: 26 April 1962, 18:00:00 UTC
- Rocket: Thor DM-19 Delta
- Launch site: Cape Canaveral LC-17A

End of mission
- Last contact: July 9, 1962
- Decay date: 24 May 1976

Orbital parameters
- Reference system: Geocentric
- Regime: Low Earth
- Eccentricity: 0.0561326957
- Perigee altitude: 397 kilometres (247 mi)
- Apogee altitude: 1,202 kilometres (747 mi)
- Inclination: 53.8 degrees
- Period: 100.86 minutes
- Epoch: 14 June 1962

Ariel 1 (also known as UK-1 and S-55), was the first British-American satellite, and the first satellite in the Ariel programme. Its launch in 1962 made the United Kingdom the third country to operate a satellite, after the Soviet Union and the United States. It was constructed in the UK and the United States by NASA Goddard Space Flight Center and SERC, under an agreement reached as the result of political discussions in 1959 and 1960. The US Starfish Prime exoatmospheric nuclear test affected Ariel 1's operational capability.

== Development ==
In late 1959, the British National Committee for Space Research proposed the development of Ariel 1 to NASA. By early the following year the two countries had decided upon terms for the Ariel programme's scope and which organisations would be responsible for which parts of the programme.

The UK Minister of Science named the satellite after the sprite in Shakespeare's The Tempest.

Three units were constructed: one for prototyping, a flight unit, and a backup.

== Design ==
=== Operation ===
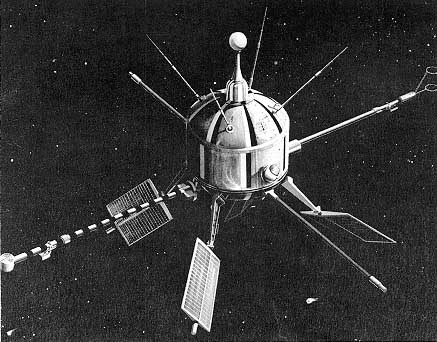
Ariel 1 illustration

The satellite weighed 62 kilograms (136 lb), had a diameter of 58 centimetres (23 in), and a height of 56 centimetres (22 in). Solar panels generated power which was stored in nickel-cadmium batteries. A 100-minute tape recorder was used for data collection.

=== Sensors ===
SERC provided the experiments, conducted operations, and later analysed and interpreted the results. Six experiments were carried aboard the satellite. Five of these examined the relationship between two types of solar radiation and changes in the Earth's ionosphere. They were selected to leverage techniques developed in the Skylark programme.

== Mission ==
=== Launch ===
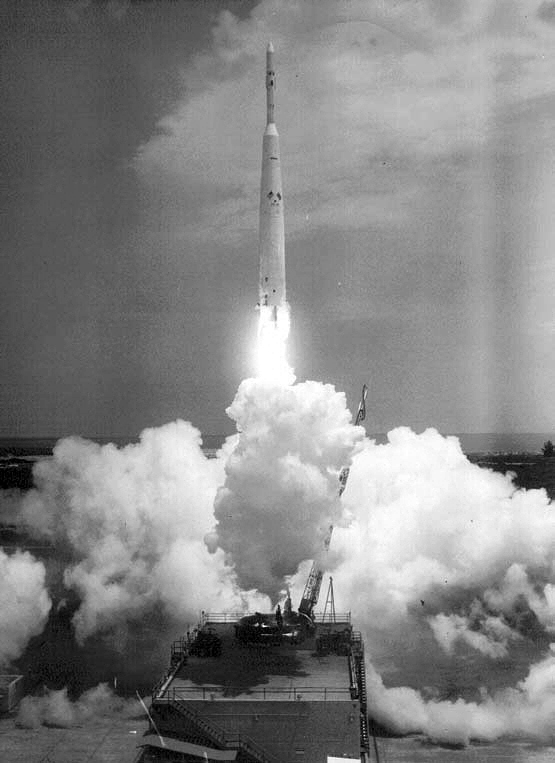
Launch of Ariel 1 on a Thor-Delta rocket

Ariel 1 was planned to launch on the Scout rocket, but the rocket fell behind in development. The decision was made to launch the satellite on the more expensive Thor-Delta rocket, although the Americans footed the bill.

Ariel 1, the first satellite from a nation besides the United States or the Soviet Union, was launched aboard an American Thor-Delta rocket from Launch Complex 17A at the Cape Canaveral Air Force Station, at 18:00:00 GMT on 26 April 1962. The successful orbit made Ariel 1 the first international satellite.

=== Operations ===
Ariel 1 was among several satellites inadvertently damaged or destroyed by the Starfish Prime high-altitude nuclear test on July 9, 1962, and subsequent radiation belt. Its solar panels sustained damage from the irradiation, affecting Ariel 1's operations. The satellite operated even after the nuclear test. The radiation disabled the timer that would have deactivated the satellite after one year, effectively extending the satellite's life. It decayed from orbit on 24 May 1976.

== Results ==
The experiments provided X-ray energy data from over 20 solar flares.
