= John Currie Gunn =

British physicist

- Born: 13 September 1916; Glasgow, Scotland
- Died: 26 July 2002 (aged 85); Gartnavel General Hospital, Glasgow, Scotland
- Education: Glasgow University; St John's College, Cambridge
- Awards: Mayhew Prize (1939)
- Scientific career
- Fields: Mathematics, Physics
- Workplaces: Glasgow University
- Doctoral students: Edwin Power, Bruno Touschek

Sir John Currie Gunn CBE FRSE (13 September 1916 – 26 July 2002) was an influential Scottish mathematician and physicist.

== Early life and education ==
Gunn was born at 19 Kelvinside Gardens East, Glasgow, the son of Richard Robertson Gunn, a tailor and clothier, and his wife, Jane Blair, née Currie.

Gunn attended Glasgow Academy school and subsequently studied at Glasgow University where he was awarded the Logan Prize as Best Arts Student of the Year in 1937. He graduated with a degree in Mathematics and Natural Philosophy. Gunn went on to further study at St John's College, Cambridge, where he conducted research in theoretical physics. His research led him to the development of counter and firing systems for mines, which were used during World War II. As a scholar of St John's College, he completed Parts II and III of the Mathematics Tripos examinations.

== Career ==
Just before World War II began, Gunn worked for three months with the thermodynamicist R.H. Fowler. He worked in the Admiralty scientific service from 1940 to 1945. He was part of a team of scientists and engineers led by Harrie Massey based first at Teddington, and then at the Admiralty Mining Establishment attached to HMS Vernon at Portsmouth. He was involved in researching countermeasures against German magnetic mines and in the development of a range of British non-contact mines. The team included many young physicists who would go on to make major scientific contributions, among them Francis Crick.

In 1943, while still working at the Admiralty, Gunn was elected to a research fellowship at St John's College, Cambridge, but after the war he chose instead to accept a lectureship in applied mathematics at Manchester University. There he worked with Professor Sydney Goldstein, a mathematician noted for his contribution to fluid dynamics, and wrote papers on supersonic flow and turbulence. In 1946, Gunn became a lecturer in Professor Harrie Massey's department in University College London, where he carried out research in nuclear and particle physics. During his three years at University College London, his focus shifted from classical applied mathematics to the quantum mechanical subjects of nuclear physics and particle physics.

Gunn then went to work at Glasgow University, where the Natural Philosophy Department, under its new chairman, Philip Dee, was branching out into nuclear physics. (The name "Natural Philosophy" was later retired, and Gunn became a professor of Physics and Astronomy.) Dee wished to turn Glasgow University into a leading centre of expertise in nuclear and particle physics. This development provided Gunn with an opportunity to explore his newfound interest in those subjects. He was appointed to the Cargill Chair in Applied Physics in 1949. The chair had been founded in 1920 and endowed by Sir John Traill Cargill of the Burmah Oil Co. Gunn would hold the chair until 1982.

During his time at Glasgow University, Gunn collaborated with Edwin Power, who had been his student at University College, and Bruno Touschek, a physicist from Germany, to produce mesons in proton collisions. This work helped marked the establishment of the field of particle physics. With Professor Philip Dee, Gunn received funding for nuclear physics research, which allowed him and his colleagues to build a linear electron accelerator. After Touschek moved to Rome, Italy, in 1953, Gunn collaborated with John Irving on the photodisintegration of light nuclei, which later became known as "Gunn-Irving wave functions".

Later, Gunn played a notable part in the development of the electron accelerator at Daresbury in northern England, and helped arrange for the construction of a linear electron accelerator near Glasgow. Radiation from accelerating electrons at Daresbury proved to have a multitude of practical applications. He also actively supported the Glasgow Project, which sought to detect cosmic gravity waves. This project has been described as giving "much of the early impetus to international work in this field.”

He also was active in recruiting members of "three distinct theoretical research groups" at Glasgow University, "one of which remained active into the twenty-first century." Gunn retired from his position as professor of natural philosophy and Cargill chairman in 1982. In 1968, Gunn became a member of the Science Research Council, and was its chairman from 1970 to 1972. It was during his period as chairman that the British government agreed to take part in the CERN project in Geneva, which proved critical to the development of European particle physics.

He became a member of Glasgow University's grants committee in 1973 and was chairman of its Equipment Sub-committee until 1976. From 1976 to 1981, he was chairman of the university's physical sciences sub-committee. He was vice-principal of Glasgow University from 1972 till 1977 and dean of faculties from 1988 to 1992.

== Death ==
Gunn died of pneumonia and heart failure at Gartnavel General Hospital, Glasgow, on 26 July 2002, and his funeral service was held at the University Chapel, Glasgow University, on 2 August.

== Honors and awards ==
Upon graduation from Cambridge, Gunn was awarded the Mayhew Prize in applied mathematics.

Gunn was elected a Fellow of the Royal Society of Edinburgh in 1959.

In the Queen's Birthday Honours 1976 Gunn was appointed a Commander of the Order of the British Empire, and in the New Year Honours 1982 was appointed a Knight Bachelor.

In 1985 he was awarded the Glazebrook Medal by the Institute of Physics.

Gunn was awarded an honorary D.Sc. (Doctor of Science) by Glasgow in 2001. He also had honorary D.Sc. degrees from Heriot-Watt and Loughborough, and an honorary D. Univ. from Oxford.

== Personal life and attributes ==
On 30 September 1944, he married Betty Russum (1919/20–2002), a secretary, who was the daughter of Roger Russum, a brush manufacturer. She predeceased him by only six months. They had one son, Michael, born 1954, who became a theoretical physicist and a professor at Birmingham University, a daughter-in-law, Nicola, and granddaughters, Eva and Lisa.

Gunn was an avid lunchtime chess player and a lifelong cello player and concertgoer, He is described as having "a great love of music" and as being "a keen golfer" who "displayed little interest in other sports." "In personal interaction, alertly clever, he had a comprehension of others," according to one colleague. "Mingling in the Department and University he had humour and lively and persistent conversation. From 1972 to 1982 he was the benevolent Head of a remarkably happy Department."
