= Ariel 2 =

Radio astronomy satellite

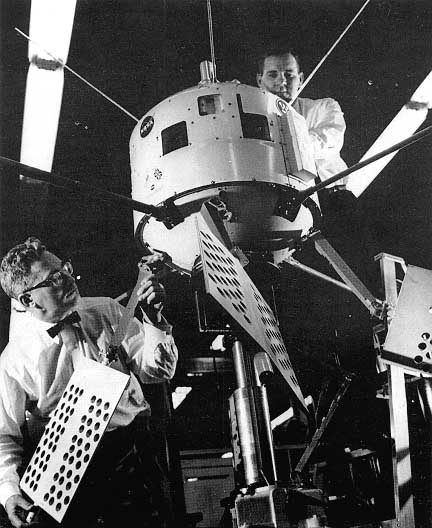
- Ariel 2 before launch
- Names: Ariel2, S 52, S 52A, UK 2, UK-C
- Mission type: Radio astronomy
- Operator: SERC / NASA
- COSPAR ID: 1964-015A
- SATCAT no.: 771

Spacecraft properties
- Manufacturer: Westinghouse Electric
- Launch mass: 68 kilograms (150 lb)

Start of mission
- Launch date: 27 March 1964, 17:25:23 UTC
- Rocket: Scout X-3
- Launch site: Wallops Island LA-3
- Contractor: NASA

End of mission
- Last contact: November 1964
- Decay date: 18 November 1967

Orbital parameters
- Reference system: Geocentric
- Regime: Low Earth
- Eccentricity: 0.0733267483
- Perigee altitude: 289 kilometres (180 mi)
- Apogee altitude: 1,343 kilometres (835 mi)
- Inclination: 51.6 degrees
- Period: 101.21 minutes
- Epoch: 3 May 1964

Ariel 2, also known as UK-C, was a British radio astronomy satellite, which was operated by the Science and Engineering Research Council as part of the Ariel programme. It was built in America by Westinghouse Electric, and had a mass at launch of 68 kilograms (150 lb). It was launched in 1964, and became the first satellite to be used for radio astronomy, although the Canadian satellite Alouette 1 was launched 1962 and also did similar radio astronomy observations.

== Launch and mission parameters ==
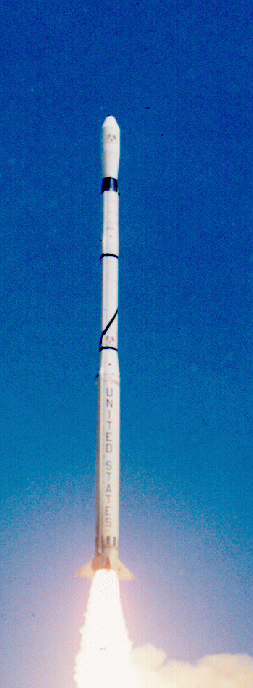
The launch of Ariel 2

The launch of Ariel 2 was conducted by the United States National Aeronautics and Space Administration, using a Scout X-3 rocket. The launch occurred at 17:25:23 GMT on 27 March 1964, from Launch Area 3 at the Wallops Flight Facility. Ariel 2 was placed into a low Earth orbit, with a perigee of 289 kilometres (180 mi), an apogee of 1,343 kilometres (835 mi), 51.6 degrees of inclination and an orbital period of 101.2 minutes as of 3 May 1964. It ceased operations in November 1964, and subsequently decayed from orbit on 18 November 1967.

== Contributions to galactic radio astronomy ==
One of the major scientific focuses of the Ariel 2 mission was to characterize galactic radio emissions at frequencies below 10 MHz. Such frequencies are difficult to observe from Earth due to the influence of the ionosphere.

It was known that a non-directional antenna operating at frequencies below 10 MHz would be sensitive to galactic radio sources, with only a small contribution due to other sources. The Ariel 2 satellite had a 40m non-directional antenna that was essentially a long wire that was unreeled from a drum in the satellite after being placed into orbit. In order to remove the effects of Earth-based radio waves, the antenna was tuned to detect frequencies between 0.7 and 3.5 MHz. This choice was not arbitrary. The ionosphere effectively blocks radio waves below 4 MHz. This is both a problem for Earth-bound radioastronomers (who cannot observe radio waves below 4 MHz) and a benefit for space-based observatories (which are not subject to noise at frequencies above 4 MHz).

The observations were processed to determine the mean sky brightness in Ariel 2's preferred frequency band.

== Telemetry and data storage/transmission ==
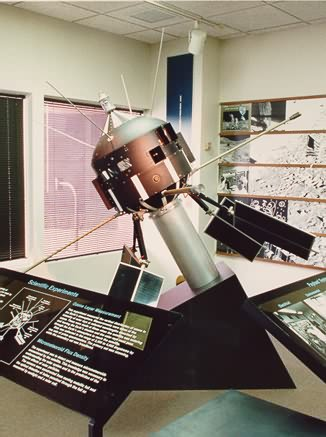
Mock-up of Ariel 2 satellite at Smithsonian National Air and Space Museum (USA)

Ariel 2 could transmit data at 55 samples per second when in range of a ground station. Data transmitted in this way included operating voltages and engineering data as well as science data. Due to the need to share the channel between multiple experiments and the engineering data itself, different data were allocated different sample rates. For example, the galactic radio astronomy data was sampled at a rate of 1 sample every 75ms during times when the high-speed transmission was possible.

In addition, the satellite had an on-board tape recorder, which was shared between experiments. The tape recorder was only able to sample at 1 sample per second. The tape recorder data was downloaded using the high speed transmission channel when the satellite was in range of a ground station.

== See also ==
- Ariel programme
- 1964 in spaceflight
