= Non-relativistic quantum electrodynamics =

Low energy limit of quantum electrodynamics

Non-relativistic quantum electrodynamics (NRQED) is a low-energy approximation of quantum electrodynamics which describes the interaction of (non-relativistic, i.e. moving at speeds much smaller than the speed of light) spin one-half particles (e.g., electrons) with the quantized electromagnetic field.

NRQED is an effective field theory suitable for calculations in atomic and molecular physics, for example for computing QED corrections to bound energy levels of atoms and molecules.
