= Ariel 3 =

1967–1970 research satellite

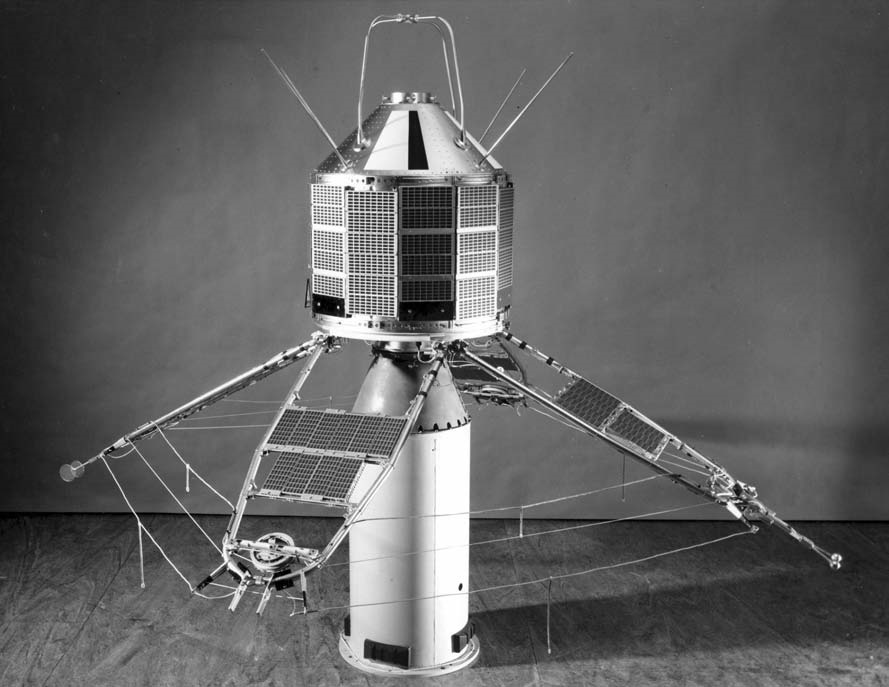
- Ariel 3 with its paddles in the deployed position
- Names: Ariel3, S 53, UK 3, UK-E
- Mission type: Atmospheric studies
- Operator: SERC / NASA
- COSPAR ID: 1967-042A
- SATCAT no.: 2773
- Mission duration: 43 months

Spacecraft properties
- Launch mass: 89 kilograms (197 lb)

Start of mission
- Launch date: 5 May 1967, 16:00:01 UTC
- Rocket: Scout A
- Launch site: Vandenberg SLC-5

End of mission
- Disposal: Decommissioned
- Deactivated: September 1969
- Decay date: 14 December 1970

Orbital parameters
- Reference system: Geocentric
- Regime: Low Earth
- Eccentricity: 0.008
- Perigee altitude: 496 kilometres (308 mi)
- Apogee altitude: 599 kilometres (372 mi)
- Inclination: 80.17 degrees
- Period: 95.69 minutes
- Epoch: 7 June 1967

Ariel 3 (UK 3 or United Kingdom Research Satellite 3) was a satellite in the Ariel programme, a satellite partnership between the US and UK. Three of the onboard experiments continued research from the first two missions and two experiments were designed for new research topics. It was launched from Vandenberg Air Force Base on 5 May 1967, making it the first satellite of the program to launch from the West coast. Ariel 3 was shut down in September 1969, and re-entered the Earth's atmosphere 14 December 1970.

This was the first artificial satellite designed and constructed in the United Kingdom.

== Design ==
=== Development ===
In 1961 the UK Space Research Group accepted proposals for experiments to be carried on the third satellite of the Ariel programme. The British National Committee for Space Research selected experiments from those proposals and submitted them to NASA in 1962. The scientific objectives for the mission were selected in January 1963, and full work on the satellite began in early 1964 due to organisational and financial difficulties. A total of 5 craft were constructed. One prototype, two engineering models, the final satellite and a flight spare. The flight spare was later used as the basis of Ariel 4.

=== Operation ===
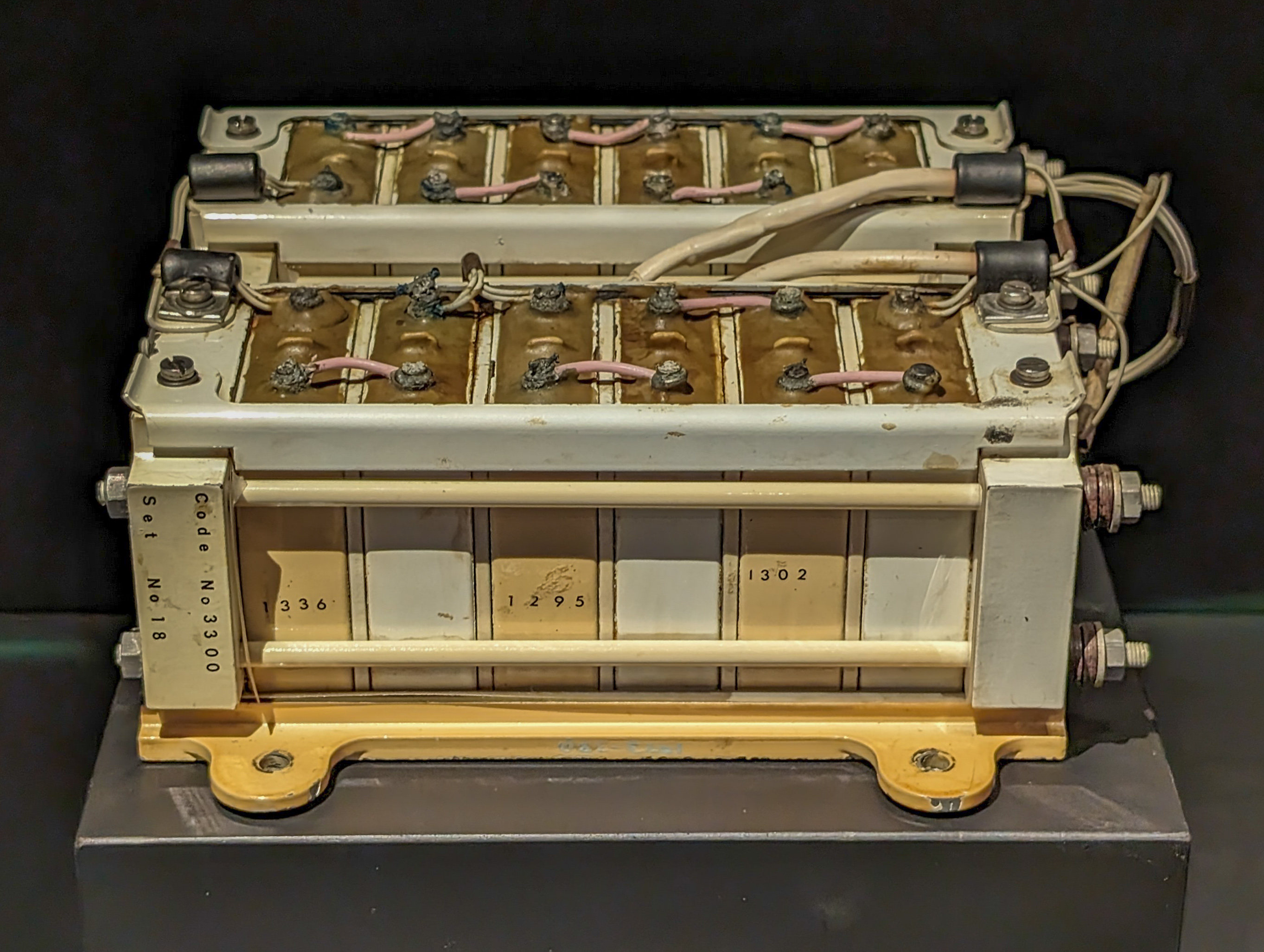
Ariel 3 type nickel-cadmium battery pack

Power could be drawn from the batteries or the solar panels. The batteries were considered the least reliable component in the system so this method was devised to mitigate the issue.

The spacecraft weighed 89 kilograms (197 lb).

=== Sensors ===
Ariel 3 carried five experiments. The experiments measured properties of the thermosphere as well as detected "terrestrial radio noise" from thunderstorms and measured large-scale galactic radio frequency noise. Ariel 3 was also fitted with a series of mirrors to observe the spin of the satellite.

High-speed data was transmitted continuously to the Satellite Tracking and Data Acquisition Network (STADAN). Low-speed data was recorded on tape recorders and was transmitted to ground stations in the high-speed mode when commanded.

Three experiments expanded on data from the previous two missions. Two experiments collected data on naturally occurring radio noise.

== Mission ==
=== Launch ===
The launch was originally planned for Wallops; Ariel 1 and Ariel 2 had both launched on the East coast. In 1964 experimenters requested a change to the proposed orbit, from an inclination of 50–70° to 78–80° to maximize coverage at the geomagnetic latitude. This change precipitated the launch site moving to the West coast.

It was launched from Vandenberg Air Force Base on 5 May 1967 aboard a Scout rocket. This made it the first artificial satellite designed and constructed in the United Kingdom.

=== Operations ===
Ariel 3 had an orbital period of approximately 95 minutes, with an apogee of 608 km and a perigee of 497 km. It initially spun at 31 rpm for stability, though by the time the Ariel 3 deorbited, it had slowed to a rate of about 1 rpm.

On 24 October 1967 the tape recorder aboard Ariel 3 began to malfunction. This restricted observation to real-time operation only. Nevertheless, as of May 5, 1968, after one year in orbit, the satellite's five experiments were still functioning and had returned 400 million bits of usable data on the upper atmosphere. Ariel 3 suffered from a significant power failure in December 1968, restricting the satellite's operation to daylight hours only. The satellite was completely shut down in September 1969. Its orbit decayed steadily until on 14 December 1970 when Ariel 3 re-entered Earth's atmosphere.
