= British National Committee for Space Research =

Committee of the Royal Society

- Abbreviation: BNCSR
- Formation: 18 December 1958
- Purpose: Space exploration research in the UK
- Region served: UK
- Members: Space scientists, physicists
- Chairman: Sir Harrie Massey
- Parent organization: Royal Society
- Affiliations: Committee on Space Research

The British National Committee for Space Research (BNCSR) was a Royal Society committee formed in December 1958. It was formed primarily to be Britain's interface with the newly formed Committee on Space Research (COSPAR).

== History ==
In October 1958, the International Council of Scientific Unions (ICSU) proposed to form a committee for space research. The Committee on Space Research (COSPAR) was the result of the proposal and first met in November 1958. Britain desired a new committee to interface with COSPAR and to organise British spaceflight activities after the International Geophysical Year (IGY). The Royal Society consolidated the Gassiot Committee's rocket and the National IGY Committee's artificial satellite subcommittees into the newly formed British National Committee for Space Research (BNCSR). The BNCSR was officially formed on 18 December 1958 and selected its members 12 February 1959. The 28-person committee was chaired by Harrie Massey and had W. V. D. Hodge as the physical secretary. The subcommittees that were to be incorporated into BNCSR submitted their final reports during the committee's first meeting on 4 March 1959 and were officially dissolved.

== Subcommittees ==
The BNCSR formed three subcommittees: Tracking Analysis and Data Recovery (TADREC, chaired by J. A. Ratcliffe), Design for Experiments (DOE, chaired by Massey), and another to coordinate with the World Data Centre at Radio Research Station (RRS) at Slough (chaired by E. Bullard).

TADREC took over the work National IGY Committee's artificial satellite subcommittee.

DOE continued the work of the National IGY Committee's artificial satellite subcommittee. The new subcommittee had two initials tasks: to find artificial satellites to launch on and to consider if it was worth providing attitude control to Skylark for better scientific results.

== See also ==
- List of astronomical societies
