= Michelle Hanlon =

American lawyer

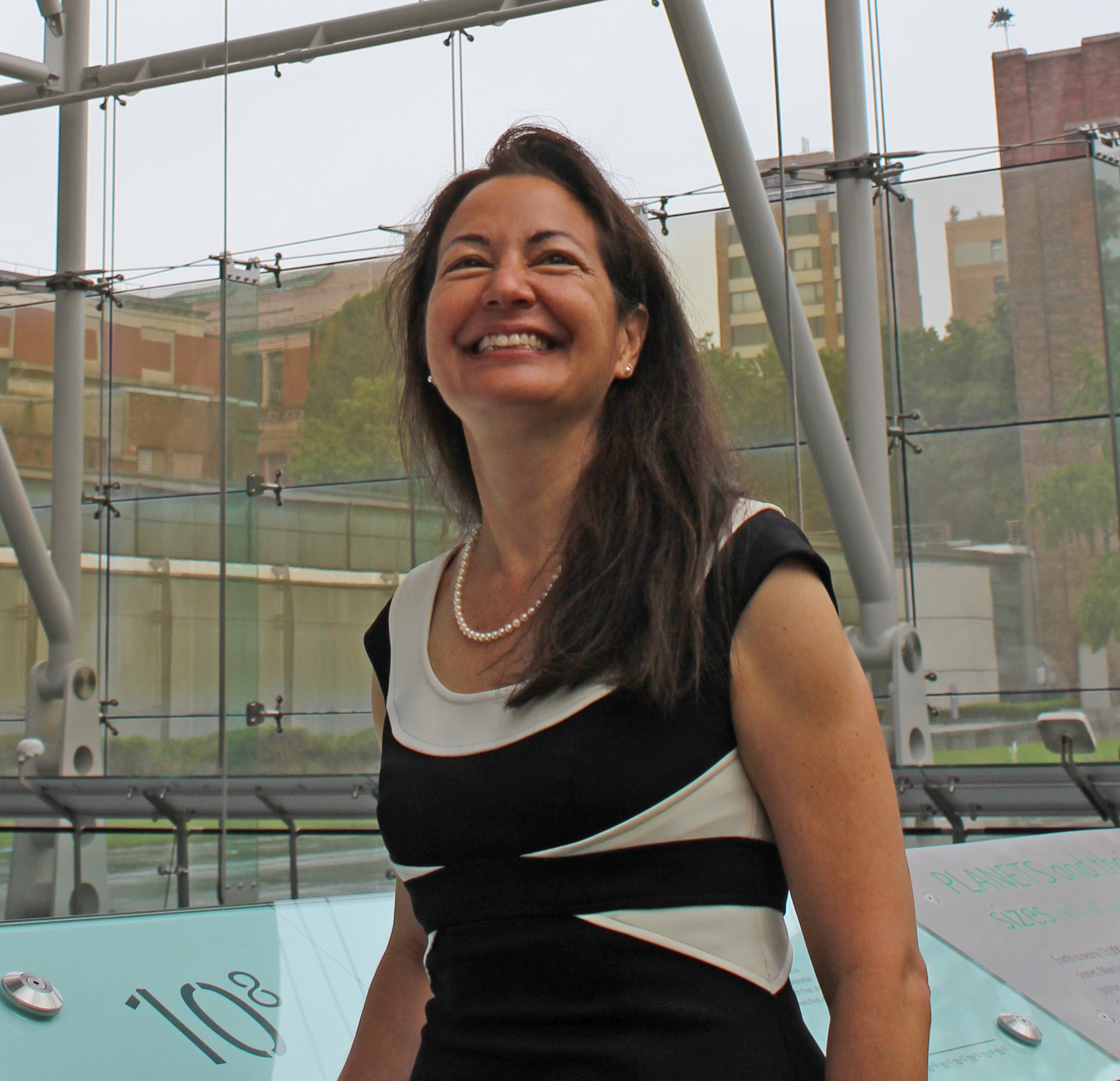
- Born: Michelle Lea Desyin Slawecki
- Education: Yale College; Georgetown University Law Center; McGill University
- Organization: For All Moonkind
- Known for: Space law expert and advocate for the protection of heritage in outer space
- Website: www.forallmoonkind.org

Michelle Lea Desyin Slawecki Hanlon (born August 8, 1965) is an American space lawyer and space law professor. She is the co-founder, president and chief executive officer of For All Moonkind, and Executive Director of the Center for Air and Space Law at the University of Mississippi School of Law.

In July 2017, Hanlon co-founded For All Moonkind with Tim Hanlon. It is a nonprofit organization protecting human cultural heritage in outer space. The organization is a permanent observer to the United Nations Committee on the Peaceful Uses of Outer Space. It advocates internationally, including with the United Nations Committee on the Peaceful Uses of Outer Space, for the development of protocols to identify and protect human history in space.

Hanlon serves on the advisory board of several start-ups involved in commercial space activities, including orbital debris removal, remote sensing, and the support of lunar resource extraction. In 2021, Hanlon joined the Advisory Council of The Hague Institute for Global Justice Off-World Approach, created to serve as a platform "where leading experts in space enterprise can work to develop a rule of law in space that is flexible, inclusive, and permissive for the next generation of space adventurers to excel."

In March 2023, Hanlon announced at the meeting of the Legal Subcommittee of the United Nations Committee on the Peaceful Uses of Outer Space, the formation of the Institute on Space Law and Ethics—a "new nonprofit organization will go beyond advocating for protecting off-world heritage sites and contemplate the ethics around some activities in space that are not fully covered in existing international law." While Space ethics is a discipline that discusses the moral and ethical implications of space exploration the Institute on Space Law and Ethics will look to address current issues in space exploration.

Hanlon is the editor-in-chief of each of the Journal of Space Law and the Journal of Drone Law and Policy. She serves as the Executive Director of the Master of Laws program in the Center for Air and Space Law at the University of Mississippi School of Law.

== Education ==
Hanlon completed high school in 1983 at the Kent School, Kent, Connecticut. In 1987, Hanlon received a B.A. in political science at Yale College. She earned a Juris Doctor degree from Georgetown University Law Center in 1992.

Later in 2017, she studied air and space law at McGill University and graduated from the McGill University Faculty of Law with a Master of Laws degree in air and space law.
