= Space archaeology =

Study of human-made items found in space

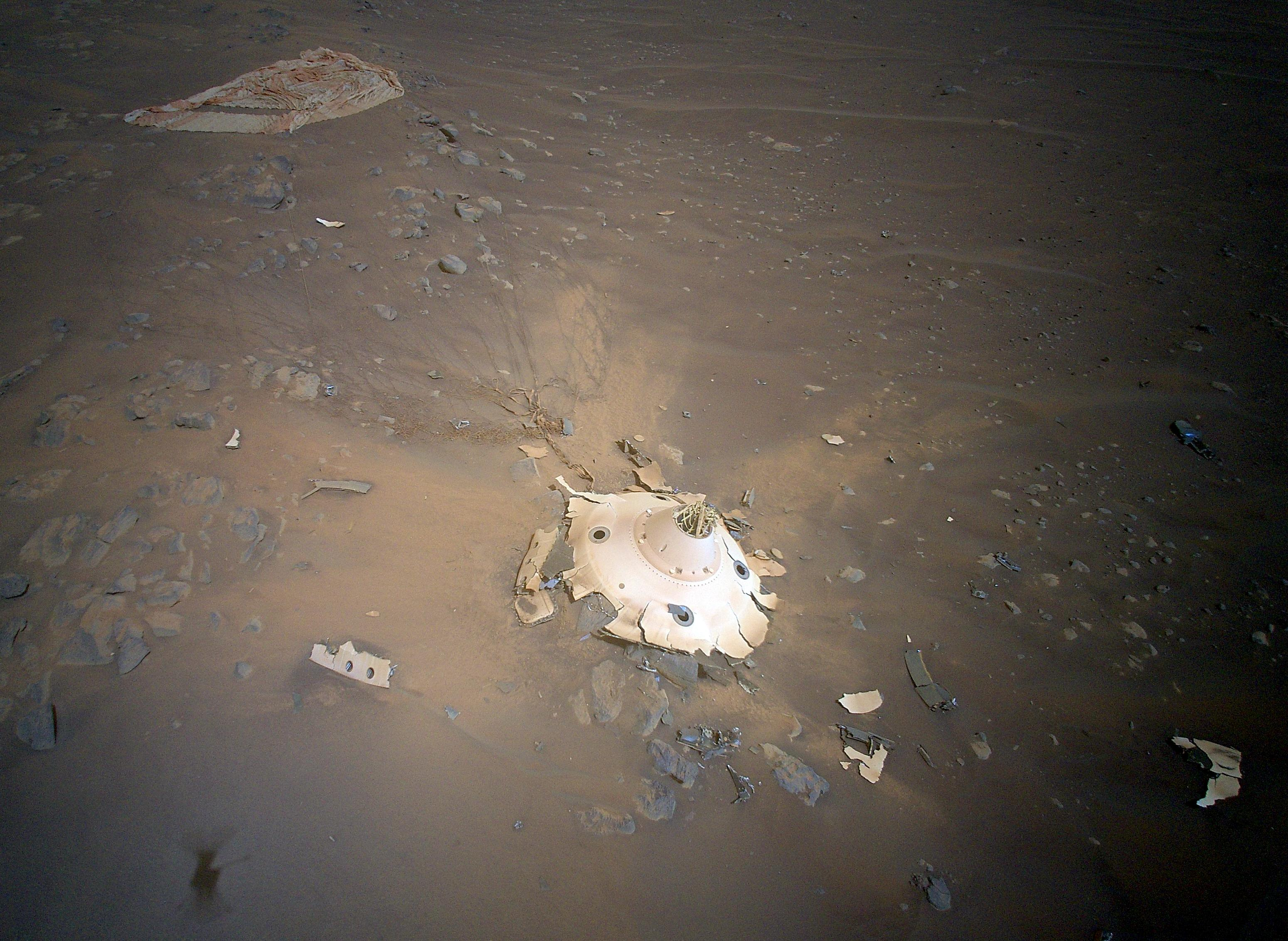
Debris field of Perseverance rover's landing seen from Ingenuity helicopter

In archaeology, space archaeology is the research-based study of various human-made items found in space, their interpretation as clues to the adventures humanity has experienced in space, and their preservation as cultural heritage.

It includes launch complexes on Earth, orbital debris, satellites, and objects and structures on other celestial bodies such as the Moon and Mars. It also includes the applied field of cultural resource which evaluates the significance of space sites and objects in terms of national and international preservation laws. Cultural resource looks at what, how and why these artifacts of our recent history should be preserved for future generations.

== Cultural heritage ==
Space tourism could affect archaeological artifacts, for example, on the Moon. The notion that cultural heritage is at stake and requires action to prevent deterioration or destruction is gaining ground. Perhaps artifacts (say, antiquated space stations) could be preserved in "museum orbit". Many such artifacts have been lost because they were not recognized and assessed. Experts assert that continuity and connection to the past are vital elements of survival in the modern world. A model has been suggested for international cooperation based upon the management of Antarctica. Implications for cooperation interest anthropologists as well.

An unexpected ramification of this work is the development of techniques for detecting signs of life or technology on other planets, or extraterrestrial visitation on Earth. One facet of this work is the use of satellites for identifying structures of archeological significance.

In January 2025, the World Monuments Fund announced that it had added the Moon to its World Monuments Watch, due to its cultural significance to humanity, the achievements of the Apollo and other lunar landings, and the increase in public and commercial spaceflight. This was the first time that heritage located off of the Earth was recognized by the Watch. The ensemble of cultural heritage associated with the Moon was nominated for the Watch by the ICOMOS Aerospace Heritage International Scientific Committee (founded in 2023).

== Satellites ==
Satellites are key artifacts in examining human encounters with space over time and the effect we leave through artificial objects. This list includes:

- Vanguard 1 - Launched in 1958, the manmade satellite Vanguard 1 and the upper stage of its launch rocket are the oldest still in orbit. Vanguard 1 lost communication in 1964 but had a few different functions, including the obtention of geodetic measurements and the testing of capabilities.
- Asterix-1 - With the intention of testing the French Diamant Rocket, Asterix-1 was the first French satellite launched into space. Asterix-1 had a very short lived transmission period of two days but remains in orbit and is expected to for centuries.
- Skynet 1A - Providing communication to Middle Eastern forces, Skynet 1A was launched over the Indian Ocean in 1969. No longer in operation, Skynet 1A has an approximate orbital lifetime of more than one million years.

== Legal matters ==
The complexities and ambiguities of international legal structures to deal with these sites as cultural resources leave them vulnerable to impacts in the near future by many varieties of space travel. An outline of the legal situation was made by Harrison Schmitt and Neil Armstrong, two astronauts who walked on the Moon as part of the Apollo program. The governing law on the Moon and other celestial bodies is the Outer Space Treaty of 1967 based upon guidelines from experience in the Antarctic. Another source of ideas is the Law of the Sea. The Outer Space Treaty contains language stating that space objects remain under the jurisdiction of the originating state, and the civil and criminal laws of that state govern private parties both on the Moon and "events leading up to such activity". State parties are to inform the public about the nature and result of their activities.

The later Moon Treaty of 1979 was signed but not ratified by many spacefaring nations. Schmitt and Armstrong believe this lack of ratification relates to disagreement over wording such as "the Moon and its natural resources are the common heritage of mankind", which is taken as possibly excluding private activity, and objections to wording concerning the disruption of the existing environment.

A non-profit organization called For All Moonkind, Inc. is working to establish legal protections for archaeological sites in outer space. The entirely volunteer group includes space lawyers and policymakers from around the world. As a result of their efforts, the United Nations Committee on the Peaceful Uses of Outer Space agreed, in January 2018, to consider the creation of a "universal space heritage sites program.". Having created a discussion around preservation in outer space, For All Moonkind is now focused on preparing drafts of implementing regulations and protocols.

== Background and history ==
During a graduate seminar at New Mexico State University in 1999, Ralph Gibson asked: "Does federal preservation law apply on the moon?" That question led to Gibson's thesis "Lunar Archaeology: The Application of Federal Historic Preservation Law to the Site where Humans first set foot upon the Moon", to a grant from the New Mexico Space Grant Consortium, and to creation of the Lunar Legacy Project.

A manuscript by scientists at NASA and ESA in 2004 raised the possibility of preserving Apollo landing sites for future "astroarcheologists."

In 2006, Dr. O'Leary with New Mexico State Historic Preservation Officer Katherine Slick and the New Mexico Museum of Space History (NMMSH), documented the Apollo 11 Tranquility Base archaeological site on the Moon. Some legal aspects of this work already have surfaced.

Though its mission is not primarily archaeological, the Lunar Reconnaissance Orbiter has imaged all of the Apollo landing sites as well as rediscovering the location of the first Lunokhod 1 rover, lost since 1971 (note: all of the U. S. flags left on the Moon during the Apollo missions were found to still be standing, with the exception of the one left during the Apollo 11 mission, which was blown over during that mission's lift-off from the lunar surface and return to the mission command module in lunar orbit; the degree to which these flags are preserved and intact remains unknown).

Based on an idea by British amateur astronomer Nick Howes, a team of experts was assembled to try to locate the Lunar Module of the Apollo 10 mission nicknamed "Snoopy", which was released during the mission and was thought to be in a heliocentric orbit. The Snoopy mission was encouraged by the 2002 re-sighting of the Apollo 12 third-stage rocket. In June 2019, the Royal Astronomical Society announced a possible rediscovery of Snoopy, determining that small Earth-crossing asteroid 2018 AV_{2} is likely to be the spacecraft with "98%" certainty.

The International Space Station Archaeological Project (ISSAP), led by Justin Walsh and Alice Gorman, began in late 2015. As of 2021, the International Space Station has been visited by almost 300 people from 25 countries, and continuously occupied since November 2000. ISSAP is the first large-scale investigation of a space habitat from an archaeological perspective, not only documenting the ISS's material culture, but interpreting its social meaning and significance. The project has been funded by the Australian Research Council, and published research on its methodology and on the creation of visual displays by ISS crew. ISSAP is using new methods to study the space station without being able to visit it directly. These methods include using more than two decades of photographs stored in space agency archives to document life on board the ISS, observing the processes used for handling cargo returned from the ISS, and developing experiments for the crew to perform on the archaeologists' behalf.

On January 14, 2022, ISSAP announced that it had initiated the first archaeological documentation of in situ material culture in a space habitat, the Sampling Quadrangle Assemblages Research Experiment, or SQuARE. NASA astronaut Kayla Barron, working on behalf of ISSAP, placed pieces of adhesive tape to mark the boundaries of six square sample areas located in various areas of ISS. These areas were documented with photography by the ISS crew on a daily basis for sixty days. SQuARE is sponsored by the ISS National Lab, which allocated crew time. It was implemented with the help of Axiom Space and funded by Chapman University. The ISSAP team published the first results from SQuARE in 2024, showing that a maintenance workstation was actually used for storage of an eclectic array of objects, and that an area with no designated function near exercise equipment and a latrine was used for body maintenance (cleaning).

== On Earth ==
Space archaeology on Earth has been done about space projects and their sites, like with the work by Alice Gorman about launch sites like Woomera launch site.

Map of the space station Mir re-entry path

The South Pacific area around the most remote oceanic location on Earth, the so-called Point Nemo, where astronauts in orbit are the closest humans, has been used as a place to de-orbit spacecraft, giving it the name spacecraft cemetery. This area has been identified as a future site for terrestrial space archaeology.

Other approaches are through archival research, through data archaeology and digital archaeology, applied to uncover historical insights.

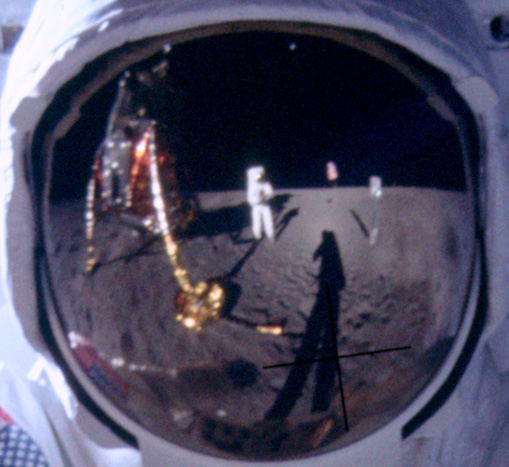
Analysis of old data and media has produced new insights into past space missions like the Apollo program. This image is a crop of one of the most famous images of Buzz Aldrin of Apollo 11 looking into the camera standing on the Moon. The image frames the visor of Aldrin and through digital archeaology showing what he saw, revealing that the Earth is visible as a pale blue dot, in this and many other images of astronauts on the Moon.

== See also ==
Space

- Human presence in space
- Mir
- International Space Station
- List of Solar System probes
- Robotic spacecraft
- Space architecture
- Space colonization
- Space debris
- Space exploration
- Space station
- Spacecraft cemetery
- Technosignature
- Tranquility Base

Heritage

- Cultural heritage management
- Historic preservation
- List of archaeological sites beyond national boundaries

Legal documents

- Rescue Agreement
- Outer Space Treaty
- Registration Convention
- Moon Treaty
- Historic Preservation Act
- Law of the Sea
- Antarctic Treaty System
