= International Space Station Archaeological Project =

Research group

The International Space Station Archaeological Project (ISSAP) is a research group working in the areas of space and contemporary archaeology. It is the first full-scale archaeological investigation of human activity in space, studying the International Space Station (ISS) as an archaeological site. It started in 2015. The project's goals are to understand human adaptations to the space environment (especially isolation, confinement, and microgravity), to identify disjunctions between how parts of the space station were designed to be used and how they are actually used, and to show how the social sciences can contribute to improving life in space. ISSAP is led by Justin Walsh (Chapman University) and Alice Gorman (Flinders University).

The ISS is an ideal site for archaeological study because it is the first permanent human habitat in space. It has been continuously inhabited since November 2, 2000, and has had almost 300 visitors from more than 20 countries. Although it is not possible for archaeologists to travel directly to the ISS to observe its material culture, the ISSAP team has developed methods that allow it to perform their investigation by proxy, especially the use of historic and directed photography.

ISSAP has published numerous peer-reviewed articles on its research since 2020. The first studies concerned crew-created visual displays, such as a Russian one in the Zvezda module consisting of flags, mission patches, toys, Orthodox icons, and photographs of Russian space heroes such as Yuri Gagarin. In 2018, ISSAP observed the only ISS material culture that returns to Earth, as part of an ethnographic study of the station's cargo-handling processes. The team has experimented with the use of computer vision algorithms to identify crew members, locations in the space station, and objects in tens of thousands of historic photos of the ISS interior. They have also used metadata in the form of captions published by NASA along with historic photos on the image-hosting site Flickr to identify the distribution of different groups of people (men/women, people of different nationalities, and people affiliated with different space agencies) across the various ISS modules.

== The Sampling Quadrangle Assemblages Research Experiment (SQuARE) ==
In 2022, ISSAP carried out the first archaeological fieldwork off of the Earth. This research was an ISS payload sponsored by the Center for the Advancement of Science in Space during Expedition 66. On January 14, 2022, flight engineer Kayla Barron installed tape marking the boundaries of six sample locations around the US Orbital Segment of the ISS. Five locations were chosen by the ISSAP team, and one by the astronauts based on what they thought might be interesting to observe. The locations included science facilities in the Japanese Kibo and European Columbus modules, a maintenance area in the US Node 2 module, a workstation in the US Destiny module, the galley in the US Node 1 module, and the aft wall of the US Node 3 module. From January 21 to March 21, 2022, the crew took photographs of each location every day, allowing archaeologists to see the objects located in each one and their movements over time. The final results from two of the six sample locations were published in 2024.

== Recognition ==
ISSAP received the Archaeological Institute of America's 2023 Award for Outstanding Work in Digital Archaeology and the American Anthropological Association General Anthropology Division's 2023 New Directions Award in Public Anthropology. Justin Walsh and Alice Gorman were both named to the Explorers Club 50 Class of 2024 for their work on the project. The publication of results from SQuARE were named one of the ten best archaeology stories of 2024 by Popular Science.
