= Center for Air and Space Law =

The Center for Air and Space Law at the University of Mississippi School of Law has been the premier U.S. platform for Air and Space Law since 1965. It is the only American Bar Association accredited law school to offer an LL.M., a J.D. Concentration and a Graduate Certificate in Air and Space Law. The core of the space law program was built by Stephen Gorove, one of the earliest jurists to focus on legal aspects of space exploration.

The Center for Air and Space Law addresses numerous topics in the fields of air, and space law including:

- Commercial space activities like space mining and space tourism
- Issues related to space debris
- Privacy
- International Law
- Use of Remote Sensing Imagery as Legal Evidence
- Intellectual Property
- Legal liability
- Environmental Issues

The Center publishes the Journal of Space Law twice yearly, as well as other publications on a broad range of aerospace topics.

The center hosts speakers and webinars, the most recent one being "Conversation: Race in Space."

== Faculty and staff ==
- Michelle Hanlon, executive director, Air and Space Law Instructor and Research Counsel. She is also the co-founder of For All Moonkind.
- Charles Stotler, co-director, Air and Space Law Instructor and Research Counsel.

== See also ==
- Space law
- Aviation law
