= Alice Gorman =

Australian scientist

Alice Gorman FAHA FSA
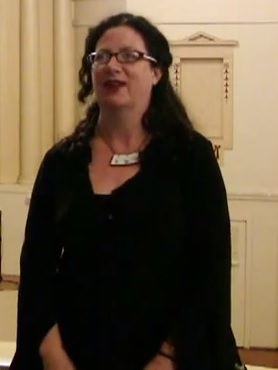
- Dr. Alice Gorman introduces a film at Camperdown, Australia
- Born: 1964 (age 61–62)
- Education: University of Melbourne University of New England
- Occupation: Archaeologist

Alice Gorman FAHA FSA (born 1964) is an Australian archaeologist, heritage consultant, and Associate Professor, who is best known for pioneering work in the field of space archaeology and her Space Age Archaeology blog. Based at Flinders University, she is an expert in Indigenous stone tool analysis, but better known for her research into the archaeology of orbital debris, terrestrial launch sites, and satellite tracking stations. Gorman teaches modern material culture studies, cultural heritage management, and Australian stone tools. Gorman is also a founding member of the Archaeology, Science and Heritage Council of For All Moonkind, Inc., a nonprofit organisation developing and seeking to implement an international convention to protect human cultural heritage in outer space.

== Traditional archaeology ==
Gorman graduated from The University of Melbourne in 1986 with a B.A. (Hons) before working as an archaeological consultant in the Indigenous heritage management sector. She returned to study in the late 1990s and obtained a Ph.D. from The University of New England in 2001. Her doctoral thesis examined how archaeologists can identify tools used in body modification through wear and residue analysis. After graduation, she continued working as a heritage consultant until receiving a permanent academic position at Flinders University in 2005. Gorman continues to work in the Indigenous heritage management sector on short-term contracts.

== Space archaeology ==
From an early age, Gorman wanted to be both an astrophysicist and an archaeologist. While she ended up pursuing a career in archaeology, she has reconciled the two by turning her research focus onto the archaeology of space exploration, or simply, space archaeology (for the use of satellite imagery to examine archaeological sites and landscapes, see remote sensing). In 2003, she took part in the first conference session on space archaeology at the Fifth World Archaeological Congress with John Campbell and Beth Laura O'Leary.

Since the mid-2000s, she has produced a number of publications on space archaeology and is credited for pioneering the concept of space as a cultural landscape and the application of cultural significance assessment to "space junk". Gorman not only explored "Space Race" that happened during the Cold War, she has also considered the contribution of Indigenous people to global space exploration and the archaeological signatures of this interaction.

Gorman's space archaeology research includes the oldest satellite still in orbit, Vanguard 1, the Woomera and Kourou terrestrial launch sites, and the Orroral Valley NASA Tracking Station. In 2013, Gorman received recognition for her work on the archaeology of space when she was invited to present at TEDx Sydney.

Gorman is a member of the faculty of the International Space University, an assessor for the Australian Research Council, and a member of numerous space and archaeology organisations including the Space Industry Association of Australia. She writes regularly for The Conversation, where she details much of her space archaeology research for a general audience. Her work has been included in the 2013 Science Online anthology and the collection of Best Australian Science Writing from 2013 to 2017.

In 2019, Gorman published her first book on space archaeology entitled "Dr Space Junk vs The Universe: Archaeology and the future" for which she was interviewed on the ABC's Conversations program. In December 2019, "Dr Space Junk vs The Universe: Archaeology and the future" was awarded the John Mulvaney Book Award by the Australian Archaeological Association, which recognises a significant publication on Australian Archaeology.

In 2024, Gorman co-authored a PLoS ONE paper reporting results from a 2022 archaeological survey on the International Space Station, showing the difference between intended and actual use of storage areas.

== Awards and recognition ==
In 2016, Gorman was elected as a Fellow of the Society of Antiquaries of London. In 2017 she was awarded the Bragg UNSW Press Prize for Science Writing for her essay "Trace fossils: The silence of Ediacara, the shadow of uranium". In 2020, Gorman was given a Distinguished Alumni Award by the University of New England. In 2021, the Working Group on Small Body Nomenclature of the International Astronomical Union announced that asteroid 551014 Gorman, a 2-km diameter asteroid orbiting between Mars and Jupiter, was named in her honour.

In 2022, Gorman was included in a program, "The Unidentified: Are we alone in the universe?", an episode of the sensational "Under Investigation". She was elected a Fellow of the Australian Academy of the Humanities in 2023.

== Publications ==
- Gorman, A.C. (2019). Dr Space Junk vs the Universe: Archaeology and the Future. Sydney: NewSouth Books.
- Smith, C., Burke, H.D., Ralph, J., Pollard, K., Gorman, A.C., Wilson, C.J., et al. (2019). Pursuing social justice through collaborative archaeologies in Aboriginal Australia. Archaeologies, 15: 536-569.
- Gorman, A.C. (2018). Gravity's playground: dreams of spaceflight and the rocket park in Australian culture. In Darran Jordan and Rocco Bosco, ed. Defining the Fringe of Contemporary Australian Archaeology. Pyramidiots, Paranoia and the Paranormal. Newcastle upon Tyne: Cambridge Scholars Publishing, pp. 92–107.
- Munt, S., Roberts, A. and Gorman, A. (2018). An investigation of human responses to climatic fluctuations at Allen's Cave, South Australia, from ca 40,000 to 5,000 BP, by a technological analysis of stone artefacts. Australian Archaeology, 84(1) pp. 67–83.
- Burke, H.D., Arthure, S.A., De Leiuen, C., McEgan, J. and Gorman, A.C. (2018). In Search of the Hidden Irish: Historical Archaeology, Identity and "Irishness" in Nineteenth Century South Australia. Historical Archaeology, 52(4) pp. 798–823.
- Gorman, A.C. (2017). Trace Fossils. The silence of Ediacara, the shadow of uranium. In Julianne Schultz and Patrick Allington, ed. Griffith Review 55 State of Hope. Melbourne: Text Publishing, pp. 257–266.
- Gorman, A.C. (2016). Culture on the Moon: bodies in time and space. Archaeologies, 12(1) pp. 110–128.
- Gorman, A.C. (2016). Tracking cable ties: contemporary archaeology at a NASA satellite tracking station. In Ursula K. Frederick and Anne Clarke, ed. That was Then, This is Now: Contemporary Archaeology and Material Cultures in Australia. Newcastle-upon-Tyne, United Kingdom: Cambridge Scholars Publishing, pp. 101–117.
- Wallis, L., Gorman, A. and Burke, H.D. (2013). The opportunities and challenges of graduate level teaching in cultural heritage management. Australian Archaeology, 76 pp. 52–61.
- Gorman, A. C. and Beth Laura O'Leary, 2013, The archaeology of space exploration. In Paul Graves-Brown, Rodney Harrison and Angela Piccini (eds) The Oxford Handbook of the Archaeology of the Contemporary World. pp 409–424 Oxford: Oxford University Press
- Gorman, A. C., 2013, Space archaeology In Claire Smith (Editor in chief) Encyclopedia of Global Archaeology, Springer
- Gorman, A. C., 2012, Space Archaeology. In Neal Silberman, ed. The Oxford Companion to Archaeology. USA: Oxford University Press, pp. 197–200.
- Burke, H. D., Gorman, A., Mayes, Ken, and D. Renshaw, 2011, The Heritage Uncertainty Principle: Excavating Air Raid Shelters from the Second World War. In Katsuyuki Okamura and Akira Matsuda, ed. New Perspectives in Global Public Archaeology, pp 139–154. New York, USA: Springer
- Gorman, A. C., 2011, The sky is falling: how Skylab became an Australian icon. Journal of Australian Studies, 35(4):529-546.
- Wallis, Lynley and A. C. Gorman, 2010, A time for change? Indigenous heritage values and management practice in the Coorong and Lower Murray Lakes region, South Australia. Australian Aboriginal Studies 2010(1):57-73
- Gorman, A. C., 2009, The gravity of archaeology. Archaeologies: The Journal of the World Archaeological Congress 5(2):344-359
- Gorman, A. C., 2009, The archaeology of space exploration. In David Bell and Martin Parker (eds) Space Travel and Culture: From Apollo to Space Tourism, pp 129–142. Wiley-Blackwell
- Gorman, A. C., 2009, The cultural landscape of space. In Ann Darrin and Beth Laura O'Leary (eds) The Handbook of Space Engineering, Archaeology and Heritage, p 331–342. CRC Press: Boca Raton
- Gorman, A. C., 2009, Heritage of Earth orbit: orbital debris – its mitigation and heritage. In Ann Darrin and Beth Laura O'Leary (eds) The Handbook of Space Engineering, Archaeology and Heritage, pp 377–393. CRC Press: Boca Raton
- Gorman, A. C., 2009, Beyond the Space Race: the significance of space sites in a new global context. In Angela Piccini and Cornelius Holthorf (eds) Contemporary Archaeologies: Excavating Now, pp 161–180 Bern: Peter Lang
- Gorman, A. C., 2008, The primitive body and colonial administration: Henry Ling Roth's approach to body modification. In Iain Davidson and Russell McDougall (eds) The Roth Family: Anthropology and Colonial Administration pp 83–103 Left Coast Press, Walnut Creek, CA
- Gorman, A. C., 2007, La terre et l'espace: rockets, prisons, protests, and heritage in Australia and French Guiana. Archaeologies: Journal of the World Archaeological Congress 3(2):153-168
- Gorman, A. C. and Beth Laura O'Leary, 2007, An ideological vacuum: the Cold War in space. In John Schofield and Wayne Cocroft (eds) A fearsome heritage: diverse legacies of the Cold War, pp 73–92 Left Coast Press, Walnut Creek, California
- Gorman, A. C., 2005, The cultural landscape of interplanetary space. Journal of Social Archaeology 5(1):85-107
- Gorman, A. C., 2005, The archaeology of orbital space. In Australian Space Science Conference 2005, pp 338–357, RMIT University, Melbourne
