= Laser SETI =

Instrument for detecting brief laser pulses in the night sky

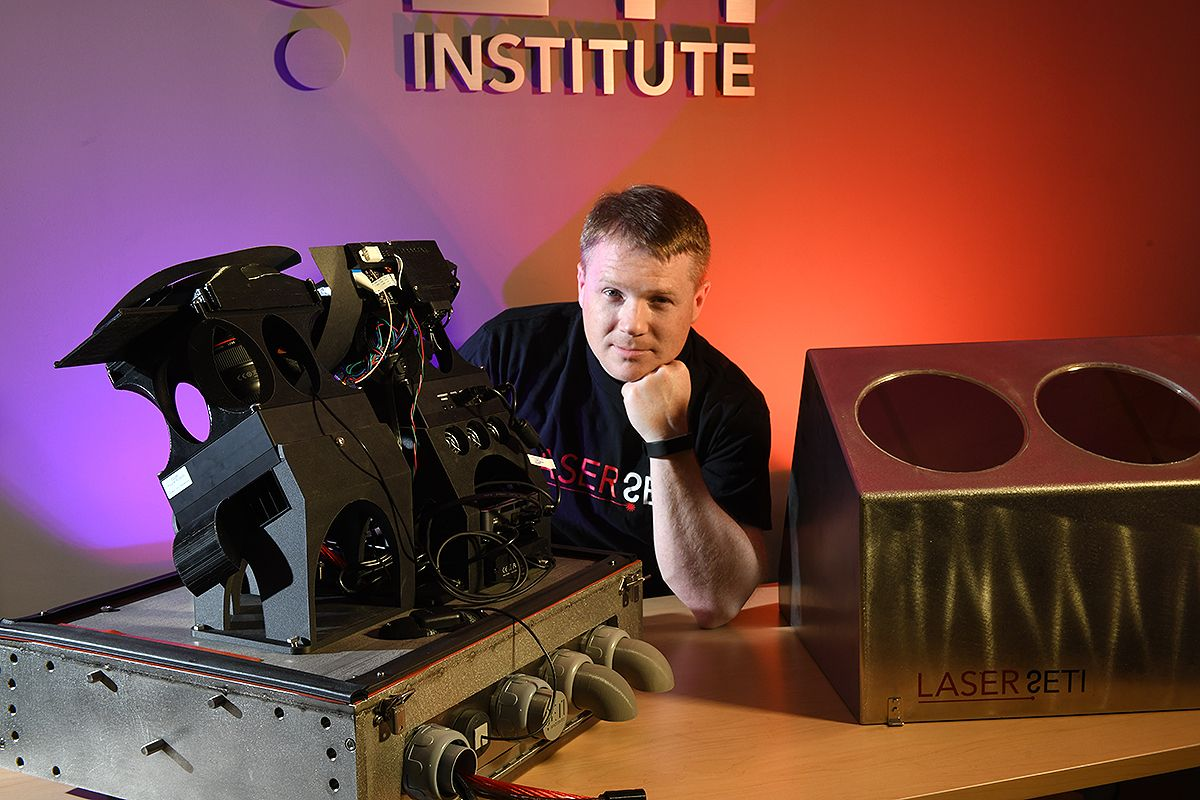
LaserSETI PI Eliot Gillum with a LaserSETI prototype.

LaserSETI is a network of optical instruments distributed around the world designed to observe "all of the sky, all of the time" in search of laser pulses originating outside of the Solar System. LaserSETI could give evidence of intelligent life beyond Earth as it searches for techno-signatures in the form of these laser pulses or high intensity monochromatic light sources. The technology, which consists of straightforward optical and mechanical components, was prototyped and subjected to rigorous preliminary tests before the first light in 2019. While the LaserSETI network of observatories is still in construction as of 2024, strategic placement of the current and future observatories will lend the network its capability for all-sky monitoring once it is complete.

With consistent all-sky monitoring, even relatively rare events could be found via LaserSETI monitoring. LaserSETI can discover pulses over a wide range of pulse durations, and is especially sensitive to millisecond, non-repeating pulses that may have been overlooked in previous astronomical surveys.

== History ==
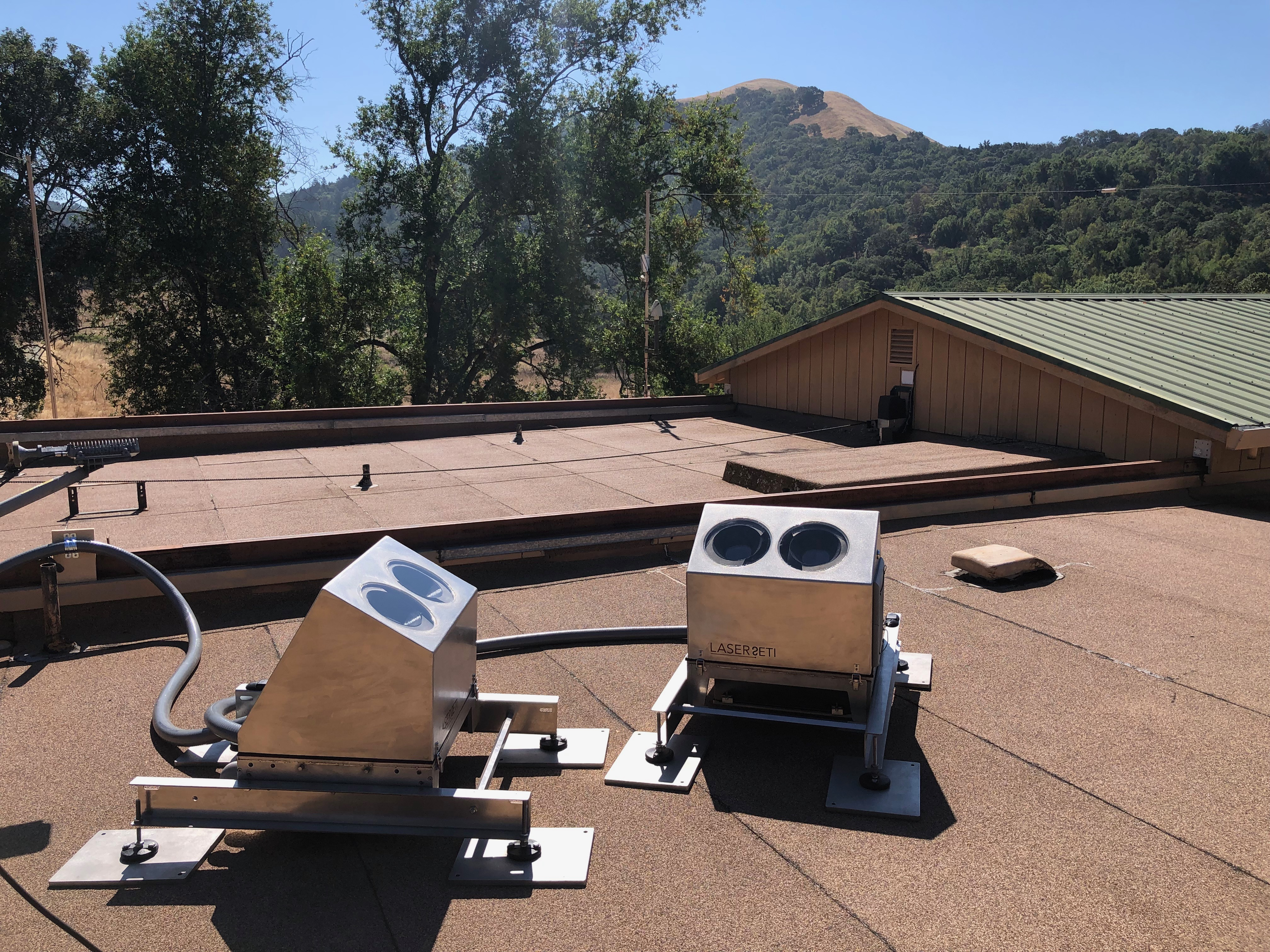
The LaserSETI observatory at Robert Ferguson Observatory in California. Credit: Eliot Gillum

LaserSETI started in 2015 as a program of the SETI Institute, though the official name was not made public until 2016. Founded by Eliot Gillum, the project began with a small team dedicated to the design, construction and scientific priorities of initial prototypes. In August 2017, the crowdfunding goal of $100k was reached, which the team used to initially deploy one camera to analyze the quality of the observations.

In 2018, the first two cameras were manufactured. This same year, the SETI Institute announced that they were going to be able to deploy eight cameras instead of four, meaning that they could fully monitor two independent fields-of-view.

In 2019, SETI announced that the final logistics were being worked out for the placement of LaserSETI's first observatory at RFO's (Robert Ferguson Observatory) idyllic facility, in Sonoma County. By August 6th of 2019, the installation at RFO was complete and LaserSETI had its first light.

In August 2021, a second LaserSETI station was installed at the Haleakalā High Altitude Observatory Site in Hawai'i, which is owned and operated by Institute for Astronomy of the University of Hawai’i. This second LaserSETI observatory was operational by Dec 2021.

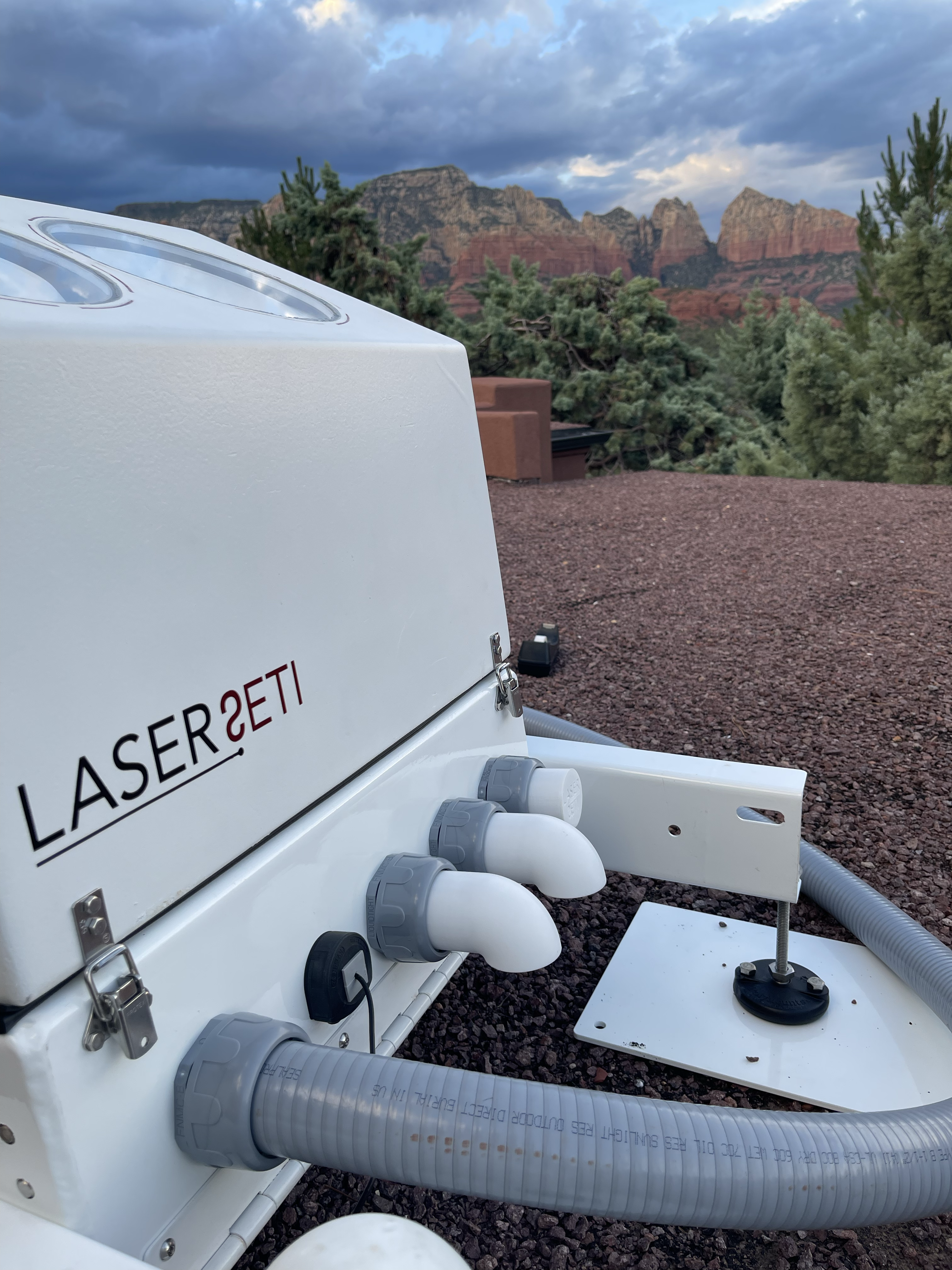
One of the laserSETI stations in Sedona, AZ. Credit: LaserSETI team.

In May 2024, the team grew with the contribution of Franck Marchis, Director of Citizen Science at the SETI Institute & Project lead, Lauren Sgro as Outreach Manager, and Tom Esposito as Science Software Manager, with the goal of accelerating the growth of the LaserSETI Network. The group will oversee the manufacturing of additional stations, their installation in the Northern Hemisphere, and the development of the software architecture.

In July 2024, two new LaserSETI instruments were installed in Sedona, Arizona, making for the third LaserSETI observatory. As of Spring 2025, the instruments have been focused and are fully operational. In August 2025, the LaserSETI team — in collaboration with the University of Puerto Rico (UPR) at Mayaguez Department of Marine Sciences and UPR at Arecibo's Dr. Abel Mendez — installed three more instruments at Isla Magueyes, Puerto Rico. These instruments overlap in field of view with the previously installed observatories.

Six more observatories are currently under construction and slated for installation outside the United States. Note that cameras are installed in pairs with their diffraction gratings at 90 degrees to each other.

== LaserSETI Instruments ==
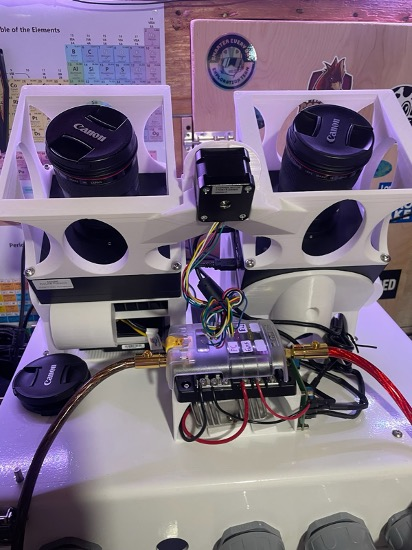
A LaserSETI instrument under construction. Credit: Eliot Gilum

Each LaserSETI instrument is made up of two wide-field, highly sensitive large format CCD cameras fitted with 24mm SLR lenses, attached to an optical transmission grating, and set within a sturdy 3D printed weather-durable frame with Pyrex windows. Residing at the base of the instrument is a PC to implement data reduction from the high-speed data from the cameras, and a hard drive to store the raw data. Images are read out more than a thousand times a second.

A second computer at the top of the instrument supplies GPS capabilities for precise clocking as well as a gyrometer and accelerometer to measure any vibration in the system to help avoid error, and an internal camera providing monitoring capabilities of the instrument itself. The components are cost effective for this level of “all sky, all the time” technology since most are COTS (commercial-off-the-shelf), with only the transmission grating and stainless steel enclosure being custom made.

Each instrument can monitor approximately 75 degrees of the sky, and each observatory consisting of two instruments with overlapping fields of view has a combined field of view of 120 degrees down to 30 degrees above the horizon.

== LaserSETI Network ==
The cameras operate fully automatically, initiating data acquisition at astronomical sunset and ceasing at astronomical sunrise. Each night's data capture begins with a calibration field of view (FOV) followed by a period of acquisition on the sky which gathers data referred to as science frames. The calibration frames serve as astrometric and photometric references. Subsequently, science frames undergo processing—including dark current subtraction, sky field correction, and bad pixel removal—on board the station. The processed frames are then transmitted to the network for storage and further analysis.

Currently, the data are stored on a private server, but plans are in place to provide open access to the data on a decentralized platform allowing universities and students to access to the data and develop their own data analysis algorithms. Additionally, live feeds of the cameras from two of the three current observatories are available on the website (https://laserseti.net/status/).

Upon the completed installation of 15 instruments across 7 sites—including Hawaii, California, Europe, the Arabian Peninsula, the Caribbean, and the Himalayas—by early 2026, the network will be capable of observing 58% of the sky. Future expansions are projected to extend coverage to the Southern Hemisphere, featuring an updated instrument design and enhanced sensitivity.

== LaserSETI Science ==
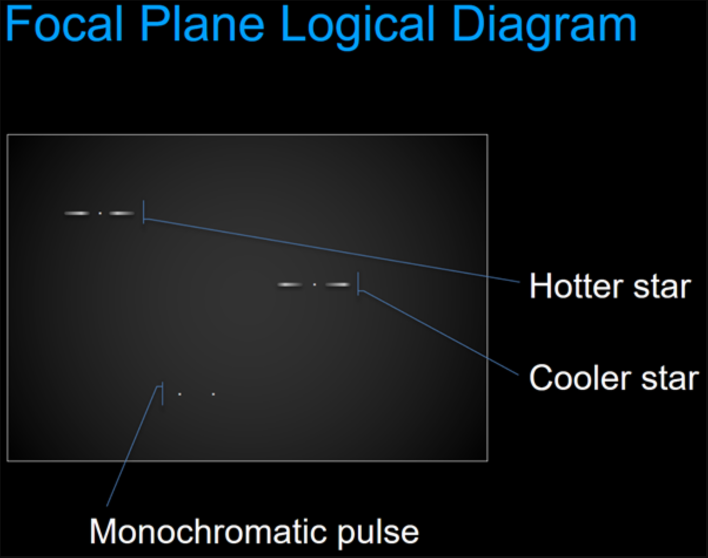
A diagram showing how LaserSETI instruments can distinguish between stellar sources and monochromatic sources such as lasers. Credit: Eliot Gilum

The main science goal of the LaserSETI project is to monitor the skies for extrasolar laser pulses. To do so, LaserSETI cameras creates signatures from natural and non-natural sources that are easy to distinguish from each other using slit-less spectroscopy. The different wavelengths of light coming from a star or other body will be spread into a full spectrum by the grating combined with each camera. In contrast, a monochromatic pulse only consists of one wavelength of light and will not produce a full spectrum and would be easily identifiable by the LaserSETI pipelines. There are no currently known monochromatic laser sources in nature, so any such detection by LaserSETI could indicate extraterrestrial intelligence or a previously unknown astrophysical process.

Meteors that enter Earth’s atmosphere are also detected by LaserSETI. Surveying meteor activity can help scientists to track fireballs, meteroid orbits, and even assist in meteorite recovery on the ground. Due to its final all-sky nature, LaserSETI might even be able to determine the cause of observed events often attributed to meteoroid activity such as “sky flashes,” which are brief flashes of light that appear as if they are blinking stars. Due to its spectroscopic capabilities, LaserSETI can distinguish and study the composition of natural objects like meteors, whereas hypothetical objects, such as relativistic meteors, could be additionally distinguished by speed.

LaserSETI will also be able to detect the re-entry of man-made debris, both planned and unplanned. Such objects can be distinguished from natural objects like meteors based on qualities like their velocity across the sky. The LaserSETI survey will be able to study the brightness and trajectory of man-made debris, like fragments of spacecraft from launches.
