= For All Moonkind =

UN volunteer organisation

For All Moonkind, Inc. is a volunteer international nonprofit organization which is working with the United Nations and the international community to manage the preservation of history and human heritage in outer space. The organization believes that the lunar landing sites and items from space missions are of great value to the public and is pushing the United Nations to create rules that will protect lunar items and secure heritage sites on the Moon and other celestial bodies. Protection is necessary as many nations and companies are planning on returning to the Moon, and it is not difficult to imagine the damage an autonomous vehicle or an errant astronaut—an explorer, colonist or tourist—could to one of the Moon landing sites, whether intentionally or unintentionally.

== History ==
The organization was founded by Tim and Michelle Hanlon in 2017. It is named after a phrase used with significance twice during the Apollo program: as text on the first lunar plaque left on the Moon by the Apollo 11 explorers ("We came in peace for all mankind") and as a statement made by Gene Cernan during the Apollo 17 mission ("we leave as we came and, God willing, as we shall return, with peace and hope for all mankind"). The organization aims to work with space agencies around the world to draw up a protection plan which will be submitted to the UN Committee on the Peaceful Uses of Outer Space. The goal is to present the international community with a proposal prepared by a diverse group of space law experts, preservation law experts, scientists and engineers which takes into consideration all the necessary aspects of law, policy and science. The effort will be modeled on the United Nations Educational, Scientific and Cultural Organization's World Heritage Convention. Simonetta Di Pippo, currently the director of the United Nations Office for Outer Space Affairs, has acknowledged the work of For All Moonkind and confirmed that UNOOSA supports and facilitates international cooperation in the peaceful uses of outer space. In November 2017, the UNOOSA United Arab Emirates High Level Forum 2017 acknowledged the work of For All Moonkind and recommended that the international community should consider proclaiming universal heritage sites in outer space. In January 2018, a draft resolution was considered by the UN Committee on the Peaceful Uses of Outer Space Scientific and Technical Subcommittee recommended the creations of "a universal space heritage sites programme ... with specific focus on sites of special relevance on the Moon and other celestial bodies."

One of the first human steps on the Moon, left by Buzz Aldrin of Apollo 11 in 1969

For All Moonkind is also working directly private companies to preserve human heritage in outer space. German company PTScientists, which is planning to send a rover to revisit the Apollo 17 landing site, was the first private company to make a public pledge of support for For All Moonkind.

In February 2018, For All Moonkind was named a Top Ten Innovator in Space in 2018 "for galvanizing agencies to preserve Moon artifacts." The honor was repeated in 2019 when the organization was recognized for its innovative "campaign to create and international agreement to preserve human artifacts in space." In May 2018, the organization announced that it is teaming up with TODAQ Financial to map heritage sites on the Moon using blockchain. In December 2018, the United Nations General Assembly granted to For All Moonkind Observer status, on a provisional basis, for a period of three years, pending on the status of their application for consultative status with the United Nations Economic and Social Council.

In spring 2019, For All Moonkind worked closely with the office of Gary Peters to develop the One Small Step Act, legislation designed to permanently protect the Apollo landing sites from intentional and unintentional disturbances by codifying existing NASA preservation recommendations. The bipartisan bill, which was cosponsored by Senator Ted Cruz was passed unanimously by the United States Senate on 18 July 2019. In the United States House of Representatives, it was cosponsored by Representatives Eddie Bernice Johnson, Brian Babin, Kendra Horn, Frank Lucas (Oklahoma politician), Lizzie Fletcher and Brian Fitzpatrick (American politician). It was passed by the United States House of Representatives in December 2020 and became law on 31 December 2021.

In October 2020, the United States and seven other countries signed the Artemis Accords. Section 9 of the Accords specifically includes the agreement to preserve outer space heritage, which the signatories consider to comprise historically significant human or robotic landing sites, artifacts, spacecraft, and other evidence of activity, and to contribute to multinational efforts to develop practices and rules to do so. This is the first time the protection of human heritage in space has ever been referenced in a multilateral agreement. Through May 2025, a total of 55 nations have signed the Accords.

In March 2021, the organization revealed the first-of-its-kind digital registry of all the historic landing sites on the Moon. The For All Moonkind Moon Registry is free to all. Astronaut and second-to-last human on the Moon, Harrison Schmitt called the registry a "worthy cause", while fellow astronaut and moonwalker Charles Duke said it is a "spectacular resource". Neil Armstrong biographer James Hansen calls it "an all-access pass to the history of human activity on the Moon."

In March 2023, the organization formed the Institute on Space Law and Ethics a "new nonprofit organization will go beyond advocating for protecting off-world heritage sites and contemplate the ethics around some activities in space that are not fully covered in existing international law." While Space ethics is a discipline that discusses the moral the ethical implications of space exploration the Institute on Space Law and Ethics will look to address current issues in space exploration.

== Human heritage in outer space ==
Space heritage has been defined as heritage related to the process of carrying our science in space; heritage related to crewed space flight/exploration; and human cultural heritage that remains off the surface of planet Earth. The field of space archaeology is the research-based study of all the various human-made items in outer space. Human heritage in outer space includes Tranquility Base (Apollo 11's lunar landing site) and the robotic and crewed sites that preceded and followed Apollo 11. This also comprises all the Luna programme vehicles, including the Luna 2 (first object) and Luna 9 (first soft-landing) missions, the Surveyor program and the Yutu rover.

Human heritage in outer space also includes satellites like Vanguard 1 and Asterix-1 which, though nonoperational, remain in orbit.

== Advocacy ==
In December 2018, the United Nations General Assembly granted to For All Moonkind observer status, on a provisional basis, for a period of three years, pending on the status of their application for consultative status with the United Nations Economic and Social Council.

In spring 2019, For All Moonkind worked closely with the office of Gary Peters to develop the One Small Step Act, legislation designed to permanently protect the Apollo landing sites from intentional and unintentional disturbances by codifying existing NASA preservation recommendations. The bipartisan bill, which was cosponsored by Senator Ted Cruz was passed unanimously by the United States Senate on 18 July 2019. It passed the House in December 2020 and became law on 31 December 2020.

Principals in the organization advocate for preservation of historical sites and artifacts on various network and social media channels.

== Leadership and advisory councils ==
For All Moonkind is an entirely volunteer endeavor with a Leadership Board and three Advisory Councils. The team includes space lawyers and policymakers, scientists and technical experts – including space archaeologists – and communications professionals from around the world.

Noteworthy members include:

- Astronaut Col. Mike Mullane, USAF, Retired
- Astronaut Col. Robert C. Springer, USMC, Retired
- American space historian Robert Pearlman
- James R. Hansen, author of First Man: The Life of Neil A. Armstrong (2005), the official biography of Neil Armstrong
- Space entrepreneur Rick Tumlinson

== See also ==
- Space archaeology
