= History of the extraterrestrial life debate =

Historical views about extraterrestrial life

The existence of extraterrestrial life is a scientific idea that has been debated for centuries. Initially, the question was purely speculative; in modern times a limited amount of scientific evidence provides some answers. The idea was first proposed in Ancient Greece, where it was supported by atomists and rejected by Aristotelians. The debate continued during the Middle Ages, when the discussion centered upon whether the notion of extraterrestrial life was compatible with the doctrines of Christianity. The Copernican Revolution radically altered mankind's image of the architecture of the cosmos by removing Earth from the center of the universe, which made the concept of extraterrestrial life more plausible. Today we have no conclusive evidence of extraterrestrial life, but experts in many different disciplines gather to study the idea under the scientific umbrella of astrobiology.

== Ancient Greece ==
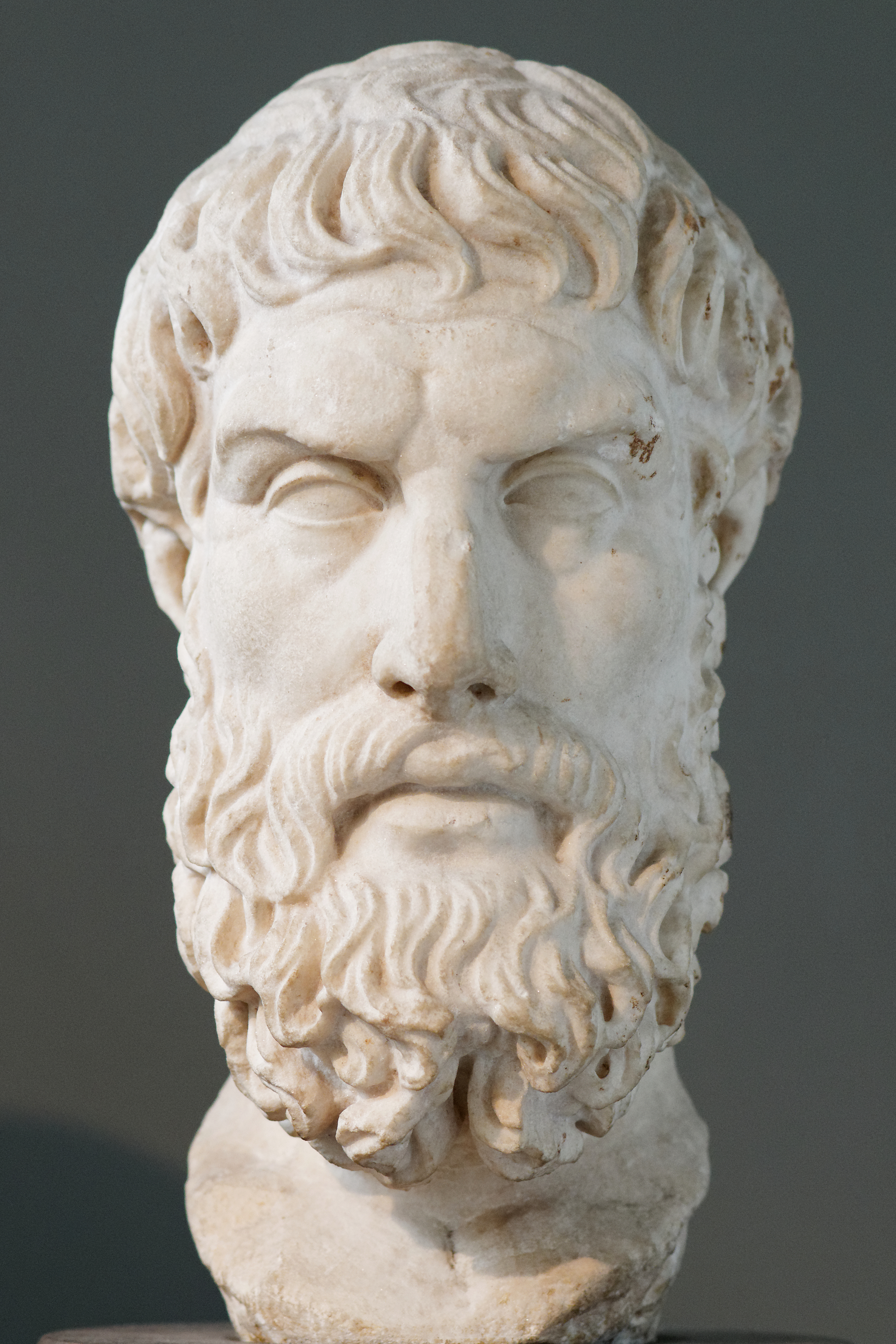
The Greek Epicurus proposed that other worlds may have their own animals and plants.

During the early days of the history of astronomy the things seen in the night sky were explained as the actions of mythological deities. However, it soon became evident that celestial objects move and behave in regular and predictable patterns, which helped in keeping track of time, tides, and seasons, crucial for ancient agriculture. Most ancient civilizations had great knowledge of astronomy but only used it for religious and practical needs. Ancient Greek astronomy sought to go beyond that and explain the architecture of the cosmos.

Thales of Miletus sought to explain the nature of the universe without relying on supernatural explanations, and reasoned that Earth was a flat disk floating on an ocean of water. The idea was not widely accepted even then, but it established the underlying idea that the universe is intrinsically understandable. Greek philosophers did not follow the scientific method but based their ideas on pure thought instead. However, their discussions laid some principles that would eventually lead to it, such as the rejection of supernatural explanations and that ideas would not be valid if they were contradicted by observable facts. They also developed geometry, which helped with architecture and other practical tasks, but also with astronomic observations.

The initial idea of a flat Earth covered by a celestial dome was soon discarded. Thales' student Anaximander proposed a full celestial sphere instead. He also noticed evidences of the curved surface of the world and proposed that the Earth was shaped like a cylinder. Most other Greeks, however, preferred the proposal of Pythagoras that Earth was a perfect sphere, as they associated circles and spheres with mathematical perfection. The model of the celestial sphere works for distant stars, which seem to be at fixed locations in the sky to the naked eye, but the Sun and the Moon move at different speeds and the other classical planets follow complex paths and vary in their brightness. This was explained by adding other layers to the celestial sphere. This was detailed in the Ptolemaic model. Aristarchus of Samos proposed instead that it is Earth that spins around the sun, which makes it easier to explain the retrograde motion of the classical planets, but this was rejected by other Greeks. They pointed out that if Earth moves a stellar parallax would change the location of stars in the sky during the year. Although stellar parallax does exist, stars are too far away from Earth, more than Greeks considered, to be noticeable by the naked eye.

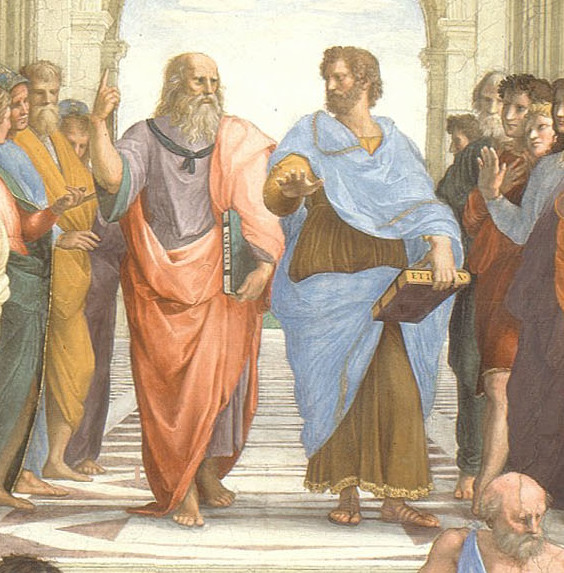
Plato (left) and Aristotle (right) opposed the idea of a plurality of worlds.

The Greeks discussed as well the possible existence of other worlds, but did not consider the planets as such. In their view, the celestial sphere was a part of Earth and other potential worlds would have their own ones. There was consensus that the world was made of the four classical elements, earth, water, fire and air. From there, they had two opposite ideas: Atomists thought that all existence was composed by atoms, small and indivisible pieces of the four elements, and Aristotelians thought that the four elements were exclusive to Earth and that the universe was made of a fifth one, the Aether. The atomist view would allow the existence of other worlds, as the processes that created Earth may happen elsewhere as well. Although very few of their writings were preserved, it is known that early atomists Leucippus and Democritus thought that atoms should create other worlds the same way Earth was created. Epicurus said in his "Letter to Herodotus" that "There are infinite worlds both like and unlike this world of ours... we must believe that in all worlds there are living creatures and plants and other things we see in this world".

Aristotle and Plato opposed the idea of a plurality of worlds. Plato reasoned that there could be a single heaven, and that if there were several worlds the universe would be composite, eventually falling into dissolution and decay. Aristotle thought that the earth element would tend to fall to the center of the universe and fire to rise away from it, under that logic the existence of other worlds would not be possible. He also thought that Aether moves in circles, and for that reason the universe could not be spatially infinite. Aristotle also rejected the plurality of universes, or heavens, arguing that the universe has a Prime Mover that started it all. If there were more than one universe then there would be more than one Prime Mover, and he considered that idea to be impossible. This idea may be influenced by his theological views, as well as his views about physics and cosmology. He concluded that "The world must be unique... There cannot be several worlds".

The Greek ideas and debates expanded across the ancient world, beyond Greece. Epicureanism spread across the Roman Empire, with proponents such as Lucretius with his book De rerum natura. Alexander the Great made a series of military campaigns that expanded the Greek Macedonian Empire to the Middle East, founding the city of Alexandria in Egypt, which would house the Library of Alexandria which was eventually destroyed. Baghdad became a hub of learning and trade during the Islamic Golden Age. Many Islamic scholars studied at the Library and cited or translated the work of the Greek authors, which did not get completely lost. They were also in contact with Hindu scholars from India, who were in turn influenced by the Chinese works and discoveries. Thus, Baghdad created a synthesis of the combined works of Ancient Greece, India, China, and their own scholars. This knowledge spread across the Byzantine Empire, and finally returned to Europe when many scholars escaped from the fall of Constantinople.

== Christianity ==
The views of the atomists fell under religious scrutiny when Christianity became a prominent religion. All Church Fathers who made mention of the idea of the plurality of worlds dismissed it as a heresy. The only exception was Origen, who did not believe in many worlds existing at the same time, but rather in worlds that may exist before and after Earth. He developed this idea to explain God's apparent lack of purpose and activities before creating the world. Augustine of Hippo rejected this idea, proposing that time only manifests in the motion of the material, which means that there was no time "before" the creation because time itself started with it. Thomas Aquinas discussed it in his Summa Theologica: according to John 1:10 "the world was made by Him", with "world" in singular, which would mean only one. A single world would also mean order, in contrast with the plurality of words held by atomists, who would believe in chance rather than in an "ordaining wisdom" creating it all. He cited Aristotelian thought as support for this notion; On the Heavens had been translated to Latin by Gerard of Cremona a few years before. He also considered that, as God was only one, he would create only one world to mirror his own perfection. However, the ideas of Aquinas were banned by the Condemnation of 1277: they considered that God was being analyzed in a very rational way, and that they were close to suggesting that God could not do certain things, such as creating infinite worlds. In the following years several scholars discussed the plurality of worlds and maintained that it was not a theological impossibility, even if they rejected it for other reasons.

William Vorilong was likely the first author to discuss the death and resurrection of Christ in the context of the plurality of worlds. He reasoned that if there were people on other worlds they would not be living in sin, because they would not descend from Adam and Eve, but they would still live by virtue of God. He assumed that the death of Christ would surely redeem the people of other worlds just as it did for humans on Earth, and did not consider fitting that God would repeatedly manifest at each different world.

== Copernican revolution ==
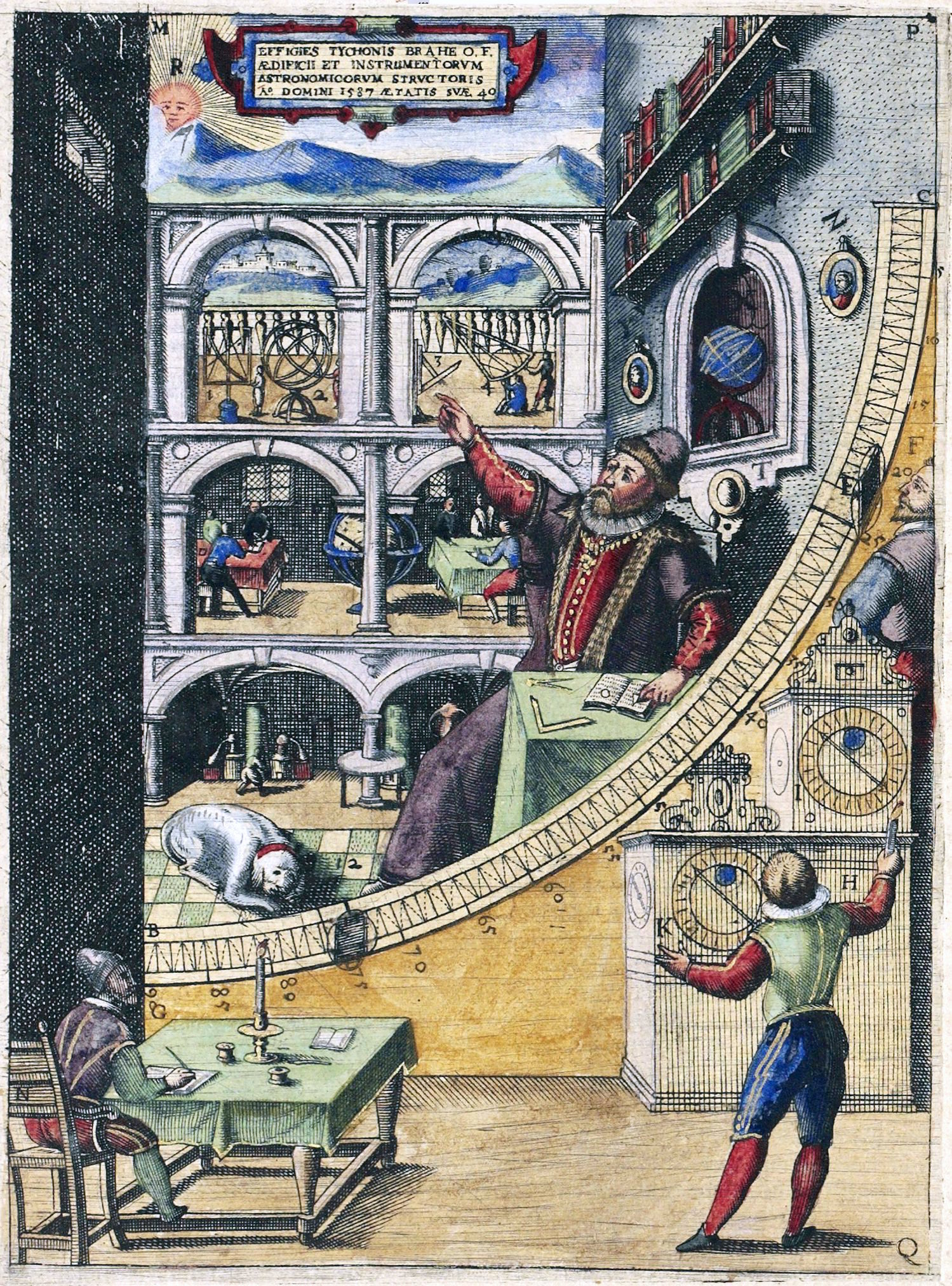
Tycho Brahe in his naked eye observatory

Nicolaus Copernicus published De revolutionibus orbium coelestium in 1543, kickstarting the Copernican Revolution. This book restored and updated the old idea of Aristarchus that Earth spins around the sun. The new version was written with so much mathematical detail that it could contest the Ptolemaic model. By this time, scientists noticed several inaccuracies in the Ptolemaic model. They were more open to revising it, but largely kept using it because of the huge work involved in changing the tables. Copernicus thought that Earth spinning around the sun could provide a simpler explanation for the retrograde motion of the planets, and calculated the distance of the planets to the Sun. However, he kept the idea of circular orbits, and added several composite orbits to explain the errors caused by it. Although he correctly displaced the center of the Solar System, this first model turned out to be as inaccurate and as complex as the Ptolematic one, and did not get much supporters in the first decades.

A recurring problem for both models was the lack of quality data, as the telescope had not been invented yet and naked eye observations are highly inaccurate. The Danish Tycho Brahe sought to gather such data, by creating huge naked-eye observatories. On his deathbed, he asked his assistant Johannes Kepler to make sense of his observations, so that it did not feel like he lived in vain. Kepler initially kept the circular orbits, and eventually found a system that would explain all the data, except for a mistake of 8 arcminutes on the position of Mars. However, Kepler trusted the accuracy of Tycho's observations, and so refused his provisional results. Instead, he challenged the circular orbits and tried with other shapes. With orbits shaped as ellipses he could explain the recorded motion of all the planets, including Mars' retrograde motion, without using composite circles to do so. He compiled his final results as the Kepler's laws of planetary motion.

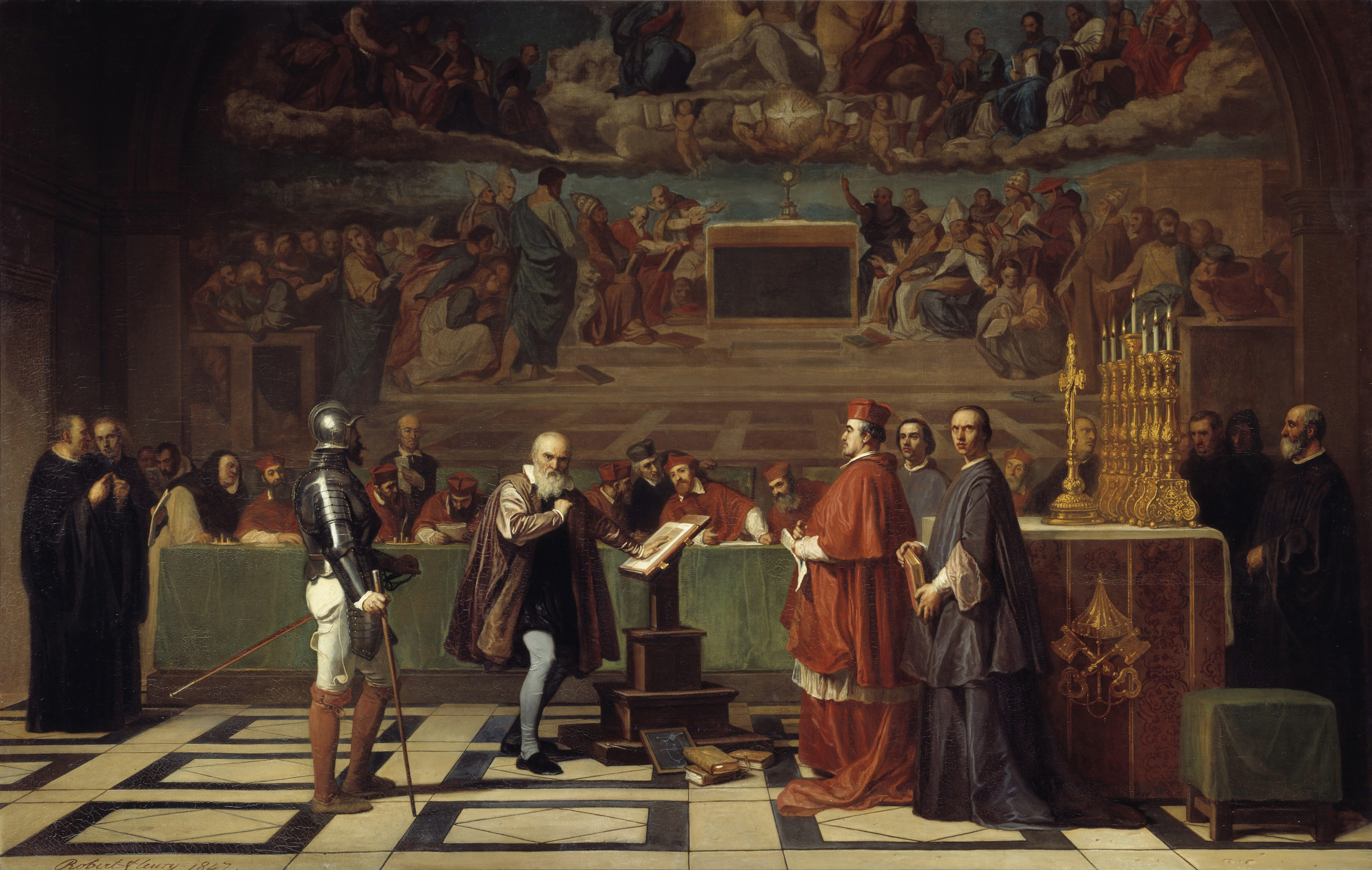
Galileo before the Holy Office, a 19th-century painting by Joseph-Nicolas Robert-Fleury

However, some scientists had concerns over the new model. Aristotle had once stated that Earth could not move because, if it did so, birds, clouds, and falling objects would be left behind. Orbits had to be circular because the heavens had to be perfect and unchanging. And if Earth moved, the stars should leave a stellar parallax. Those concerns were addressed by Galileo Galilei. First, he explained that an object in motion stays in motion unless a force stops it; a principle nowadays included in the first of Newton's laws of motion. The idea of heavenly perfection was already being challenged by Tycho's observations. Tycho had observed a supernova, which proved that sometimes the heavens do change. The newly invented telescope also revealed "imperfections" in celestial bodies: the sun was shown with sunspots, and the Moon has many features such as craters and mountain ranges. If the heavens were not as perfect as originally considered, then the idea that orbits are not perfect circles was not so questionable. Galileo also discovered the Galilean moons of Jupiter, celestial bodies orbiting another planet, and the phases of Venus. The existence of the Galilean moons refuted the common argument that the Moon would not stay with a moving Earth. As for the stellar parallax, Galileo could not prove that the stars were more distant than estimated, but got strong evidence suggesting it: a closer look at the Milky Way revealed that it is composed of several stars.

Although those discoveries proved that Earth was not located at the center of everything, they did not completely prove that it spins around the Sun; this fact was fully confirmed when the stellar parallax was measured in detail and with stellar aberration. However, the idea generated such controversy that Galileo was summoned by the Inquisition and forced to recant his findings. Galileo, who was 70 at the time and probably fearing that his life would be at stake, did as ordered. It is said that Galileo muttered "Eppur si muove" (Italian for "And yet it moves"), but most historians doubt it, given the possible consequences Galileo would have faced if heard.

Despite the trial, by 1630 the model of Kepler and the clarifications of Galileo were unanimously accepted. However, although it was accepted that planets moved in ellipses, it was not clear why they did so. The reason was finally explained by Sir Isaac Newton in his book Philosophiæ Naturalis Principia Mathematica, which described the three laws of motion. (Note: Not to be confused with Kepler's laws of planetary motion, mentioned earlier) This book also introduced the law of universal gravitation, and explains all motions in the universe. It also uses maths to explain that Kepler's laws of planetary motion are a natural consequence of the laws of gravitation and motion. With this, the geocentric model was completely discarded.

The Copernican revolution, the time between Copernicus and Newton, was almost 150 years and changed science forever. It changed the view of the universe and the place of Earth and humankind in it, shifting from a central position to just a world like many others. It also changed the way science works. Previous academics were willing to give leeway to mistakes and errors of measurement, which were strictly less tolerated by the new generations. There was also a stronger emphasis to understand not only how nature works, but also why it works that way and not another. Mere guesses like atomism or aesthetic preferences like heavenly perfection would not fly anymore. Any explanation and assumption was required to be proved before being accepted.

Although the dispute was not specifically about extraterrestrial life, the outcome kickstarted it. As there was a conflict between atomists and Aristotelians back in ancient Greece, and the Aristotelians were proved to be wrong, many assumed that this meant that atomists were right and that other worlds were just like Earth. However, the only fact about this that was found at this time was that the stars and the classical planets are not lights but celestial objects analogous to Earth, and that life in them may be plausible, if still unknown. The idea of extraterrestrial life, which was once a radical notion held by limited and specific people, became an accepted idea discussed in college classrooms. The change was also possible because of the changes in religious and philosophical thinking that took place at the time.

Besides that, there was much speculation. Galileo confused the lunar mares with seas. Kepler said that the Moon has an atmosphere and intelligent inhabitants, even writing a science fiction story about them. Dominican philosopher Giordano Bruno accepted the existence of extraterrestrial life, which became one of the charges leveled against him at the Inquisition, leading to his execution.

== Modern times ==
The study of astronomy continued after Newton, and later technological devices and math models allowed to study objects that were undreamt of at the time. Although no actual extraterrestrial life has been found, either in the Solar System or elsewhere, science currently has a far greater understanding of the context of such life or lack thereof. Biology studies the nature of life, and chemistry and biochemistry the way it works. Chemistry and biochemistry also help to understand abiogenesis, the process by which life can be generated by non-living things, which is not yet completely understood. Physics in general and planetary science in particular help to understand the conditions at places other than Earth and how they can be more beneficial or harmful for life. All those sciences are collectively studied under the umbrella science of astrobiology.

Most knowledge of astronomy is relevant in some way for the discussion of extraterrestrial life, but there are three main tenets. One, that the universe is incredibly vast and old. Second, the elements that make up life on Earth are plentiful. Third, that the laws that rule matter are the same across the universe. As a result, it can be reasoned that there is nothing special about Earth, and that life on other worlds should be plausible.

== See also ==
- Plurality of worlds – Belief in numerous life-bearing "worlds"
- Exotheology – Examination of theological issues as they pertain to extraterrestrial intelligence

== Bibliography ==
- Bennett, Jeffrey O.; Shostak, Seth (2016). Life in the universe (4th ed.). United States: Pearson. ISBN 978-0-13-408908-9.
- Crowe, Michael J., ed. (2008). The extraterrestrial life debate antiquity to 1915: A source book. Notre Dame, Indiana: University of Notre Dame Press. ISBN 978-0-268-02368-3.
