= Space ethics =

Discipline of applied ethics

Space ethics, astroethics or astrobioethics is a discipline of applied ethics that discusses the moral and ethical implications arising from astrobiological research, space exploration and space flight. It deals with practical contemporary issues like the protection of the space environment and hypothetical future issues pertaining to our interaction with extraterrestrial life forms.

Specific issues of space ethics include space debris mitigation, the militarization of space and the ethics of SETI and METI, but also more theoretical topics like space colonization, terraforming, directed panspermia and space mining. The field also concerns itself with more fundamental moral questions, such as the value of abiotic environments in space, the intrinsic value of extraterrestrial life, and how humans should treat extraterrestrial non-intelligent life (like microbes) and extraterrestrial intelligent life (and whether this distinction should be made in the first place).

Astroethical issues are often discussed as elements of broader issues such as general environmental protection and imperialism. Astroethics have been described as an emerging discipline gaining in attention, a "necessity for astrobiology" and a "true issue for the future of astrobiology".

== Ethical guidelines for space exploration ==
=== Planetary Protection ===
A guiding principle in astroethics is that of Planetary Protection (PP), which seeks to prevent the introduction of lifeforms from Earth to other celestial bodies (forward contamination) and vice versa (back contamination), and thereby possible adverse consequences on existing ecospheres resulting from such contamination. This principle is anchored in the UN Outer Space Treaty, which was established in 1967 and has since been signed and ratified by all space-faring nations.

=== Precautionary Principle ===
The precautionary principle was defined in the 1998 Wingspread Conference on the Precautionary Principle. This approach is supposed to guide decisions in the face of a lack of scientific knowledge or consensus on a matter. In a 2010 COSPAR workshop at Princeton University, 26 experts embraced the precautionary principle and concluded that "further investigations before interference that is likely to be harmful to Earth and other extraterrestrial bodies, including extraterrestrial life and the contamination and disturbance of celestial environments", are to be conducted.

=== Other Astroethical Principles for SETI ===
SETI astrobiologist Margaret Race and Methodist theologian Richard Randolph have outlined 4 principles for the search for extra-terrestrial life within the Solar System:

1. Cause no harm to Earth, its life, or its diverse ecosystems.
2. Respect the ecosystem on the surveyed celestial body, do not irreparably alter it or its evolutionary trajectory.
3. Follow proper scientific procedures with honesty and integrity during all phases of exploration.
4. Ensure international participation by all interested parties.

== Issues ==
A wide range of concrete issues is discussed in astroethics. Some of them are herein elaborated.

=== Sterility ===
Assumptions about outer space, particularly regarding space colonization, have characterized outer space as sterile and therefore a terra nullius. This assumption does not hold true, particularly considering that Earth is part of it.

=== Space debris ===
Millions of pieces of space debris, defunct artificial objects in space, are orbiting Earth. On average, one cataloged piece of space debris falls back onto the planet every day, potentially posing a risk to organisms and property. In total, an estimated 80 tons of space debris re-enter Earth's atmosphere every year. Due to the high friction with the atmospheric gases, the debris burns up, causing the release of its chemical components, which may contribute to atmospheric pollution and ozone depletion. Additionally, space debris orbits the Earth at extremely high velocity. In Low Earth Orbit, where all crewed space stations and many satellites are located, debris typically reaches speeds of around 8 km/s (approximately 18,000 mph or 29,000 km/h). As a result, even tiny pieces of debris can severely damage or destroy satellites and spacecraft in the event of a collision. This could pose a threat to the lives of astronauts on crewed missions and lead to the phenomenon of Kessler syndrome, where a collision of objects in space produces new fragments of space debris that could set off a chain reaction of more collisions. This could render the space around Earth untraversable for space missions and unsuitable for the use of satellites.

As of March 2022, there are no legally binding international laws about who is responsible for the extraction of space debris, or mandating a reduction of new space debris brought into Earth's orbit. However, space agencies of several countries have implemented their own standards and policies to reduce introduction of new space debris, and the Inter-Agency Space Debris Coordination Committee (IADC) has been founded to address issues regarding orbital debris. Additionally, JAXA is researching an electromagnetic tether that could be used to pull debris down into the atmosphere.

The moral problem is that those in power (space agencies) can launch material into the Earth's orbit for their own gains without being held accountable for it, while the general public has to bear the consequences (such as atmospheric pollution or the risk of being hit by space debris).

=== Satellite surveillance ===
Reconnaissance satellites are used for a variety of military and intelligence purposes, such as optical imaging and signals intelligence. It has been noted that such data could infringe on people's privacy and thereby lead to ethical and legal issues. It could also turn into a source of national security threats if such information got into malevolent hands. In order to ensure ethically correct obtainment and use of satellite data, leading researchers in law, meteorology and atmospheric science have called for new policy which would lead to more transparency and security.

=== Weaponizing space ===
In 1967, the Outer Space Treaty was signed, spurred by the development of intercontinental ballistic missiles, the Soviet Union's launch of Sputnik, the first artificial satellite, and the following arms race with the United States. The treaty outlaws all kinds of military action (including weapon tests) in space, limits the use of space to peaceful purposes only and ensures that all nations on Earth are free to explore space.

This treaty has since been called into question multiple times, especially by President of the United States Donald Trump. On June 18, 2018, Trump announced plans to establish a space force, which would constitute a new, sixth branch of the United States military. He expressed that "When it comes to defending America, it is not enough to merely have an American presence in space. We must have American dominance in space". On December 20, 2019, the United States Space Force Act was signed into law with votes from both Democratic and Republican senators and House members. As a result, the United States Space Force was founded.

This was seen by some as an American contestation of the Outer Space Treaty. Viktor Bondarev, chair of the Federation Council Committee on Defense and Security, responded by saying that if the US were to go further and withdraw from the 1967 treaty, there would be "a tough response aimed at ensuring world security." This is despite Russia itself having a space force branch in their military.

=== Private spaceflight and space tourism ===
The emergence of space tourism gives rise to a number of ethical concerns. Future frequent and large-scale landings on celestial bodies like the moon may damage or pollute landing sites and the areas around them. While scientific activity in space is benign, this cannot be guaranteed for actions by private people. If, how, by what criteria and by whom laws should be made to ensure that space tourism doesn't negatively impact other celestial bodies is a question of astroethics.

=== Terraforming other celestial bodies ===
Terraforming is a controversial astroethical matter. Proponents of terraforming, like Robert Zubrin, argue that humans, being the only technologically advanced and intelligent species on Earth, have a moral obligation to make other celestial bodies habitable for Earth's lifeforms to ensure their survival after the inevitable destruction of our planet. The other, ecocentrist and biocentrist side of the debate criticizes this position as anthropocentrism and argues that other celestial bodies may already contain life which always has intrinsic value, no matter how advanced it may be. They oppose the interplanetary contamination and changes to the other world that would stem from terraforming, as they could endanger the indigenous life and alter its evolutionary trajectory.

=== Ethicality of SETI and METI ===
SETI and especially METI (Active SETI) are not uncontroversial and come with their own ethical implications. METI has been criticized as incompatible with the precautionary principle because it could reveal the location of our planet to potentially malevolent alien species. It therefore also potentially puts all of humanity at risk without the need for their individual prior consent, which violates the basic scientific rule of informed consent that all other science must abide by. Reflecting on human history, some authors even fear the enslavement of humanity, should we be discovered by a more advanced species. Similarly, Stephen Hawking, one of the most prominent METI critics, warned of the potential consequences of a meeting with such a species, citing the near-extinction of Aboriginal Tasmanians as an equivalent case from human history.

Concerns regarding the ethicality of METI might be a solution to the Fermi paradox. It is proposed that extraterrestrial life forms may abstain from attempting interstellar communication due to the potential danger it may pose to them, in line with the precautionary principle.

Other astroethical considerations regarding METI are the lack of legally enforceable protocols about the steps that should be taken once extraterrestrial life is discovered, the unpredictability of cultural consequences of that discovery (potential paradigm changes in policy, nations, religions, etc.), who will get to speak for humanity in case contact is made, how and by whom that person or group of people should be selected, and what the contents of the messages should be.

=== Value of extraterrestrial life ===
A further point of contention in the field is whether extraterrestrial life has intrinsic value and therefore if humans have a moral obligation to protect it. This becomes even more difficult when considering the wide span of possible extraterrestrial life forms and whether our treatment of them should differ based on criteria such as their advancement and intelligence. As former NASA chief historian Steven J. Dick put it, "Does Mars belong to the Martians, even if the Martians are only microbes?" Dick argues that the first step in deciding how we should interact with life forms is to assess their moral status, which is complicated by our ambiguous relations with animals on earth, sheltering some species as pets while eating and exterminating others. The principle of planetary protection provides that all life on other celestial bodies is worthy of protection from harm (also in the form of contamination) and therefore confers rights even on hypothetical extraterrestrial microbes, a situation that contrasts with our treatment of microbes and even most higher-developed organisms on Earth. This difference in treatment is hardly justifiable. Therefore, according to Dick, astroethical considerations will broaden our current ethical horizon: they will unveil such inconsistencies and double standards and move humanity from an anthropocentric ethic (ascribing intrinsic value only to rationing beings) to a cosmocentric or biocentric one that values all living things. In fact, Dick says that the finding of extraterrestrial life would "necessitate" a transition away from the anthropocentric approach because it would no longer be consistently applicable to a cosmos that harbors life beyond Earth.

=== Space burial ===
The decision to include several grams of human cremains onboard Peregrine Lunar Lander flight 01 was criticized by the Navajo Nation, whose president, Buu Nygren, argued that the Moon is sacred to the Navajo and other American Indian nations, saying "As stewards of our culture and traditions, it is our responsibility to voice our grievances when actions are taken that could desecrate sacred spaces and disregard deeply held cultural beliefs". Celestis CEO Charles Chafer responded that "[the company] reject[s] the whole premise that this is somehow desecration" and that "nobody owns the Moon". The launch was not successful in reaching the Moon.

== See also ==
- Environmental ethics
- Ethics of technology
