= Goldilocks principle =

Analogy for optimal conditions

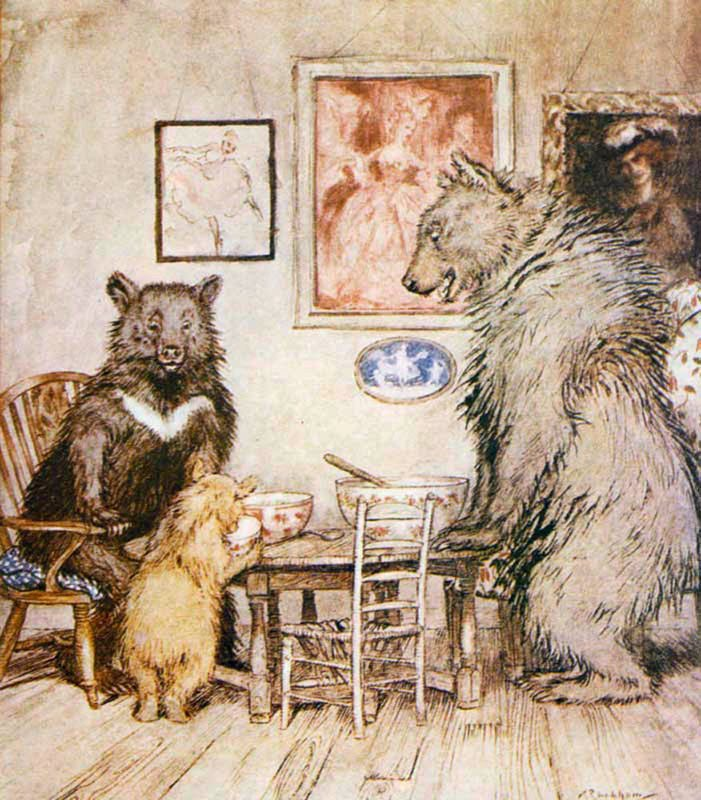
Illustration for "Goldilocks and the Three Bears"

The Goldilocks principle is named by analogy to the children's story "Goldilocks and the Three Bears", in which a young girl named Goldilocks tastes three different bowls of porridge and finds she prefers porridge that is neither too hot nor too cold but has just the right temperature. The concept of "just the right amount" is easily understood and applied to a wide range of disciplines, including developmental psychology, biology, astronomy, economics and engineering.

== Applications ==
An animation used to study the Goldilocks effect in visual attention of infants

In cognitive science and developmental psychology, the Goldilocks effect or principle refers to an infant's preference to attend events that are neither too simple nor too complex according to their current representation of the world. This effect was observed in infants, who are less likely to look away from a visual sequence when the current event is moderately probable, as measured by an idealized learning model.

In astrobiology, the Goldilocks zone refers to the habitable zone around a star. As Stephen Hawking put it, "Like Goldilocks, the development of intelligent life requires that planetary temperatures be 'just right'". The Rare Earth hypothesis uses the Goldilocks principle in the argument that a planet must be neither too far away from nor too close to a star and galactic centre to support life, while either extreme would result in a planet incapable of supporting life. Such a planet is colloquially called a "Goldilocks planet". Paul Davies has argued for the extension of the principle to cover the selection of our universe from a (postulated) multiverse: "Observers arise only in those universes where, like Goldilocks' porridge, things are by accident 'just right'".

In economics, a Goldilocks economy sustains moderate economic growth and low inflation, which allows a market-friendly monetary policy. Goldilocks pricing, also known as good–better–best pricing, is a marketing strategy that uses product differentiation to offer three versions of a product to corner different parts of the market: a high-end version, a middle version, and a low-end version.

In communication, the Goldilocks principle describes the amount, type, and detail of communication necessary in a system to maximise effectiveness while minimising redundancy and excessive scope on the "too much" side and avoiding incomplete or inaccurate communication on the "too little" side.

In statistics, the "Goldilocks Fit" references a linear regression model that represents the perfect flexibility to reduce the error caused by bias and variance.

In the design sprint, the "Goldilocks Quality" means to create a prototype with just enough quality to evoke honest reactions from customers.

In machine learning, the Goldilocks learning rate is the learning rate that results in an algorithm taking the fewest steps to achieve minimal loss. Algorithms with a learning rate that is too large often fail to converge at all, while those with too small a learning rate take too long to converge.

== See also ==
- Cosmic Jackpot
- Frugality
- Anthropic principle
- Big History
- Fine-tuned universe
- Golden mean (philosophy)
- Anna Karenina principle
