= Grid Iron Theatre Company =

Scottish theatre company est. 1995

Grid Iron Theatre Company Ltd.
- Type: Registered charity of Scotland
- Industry: Theatre Company
- Founded: 1995
- Founder: Judith Doherty
- Key people: Judith Doherty (Chief Executive / Producer / Co-Artistic Director); Ben Harrison (Co-Artistic Director); Deborah Crewe (Director of Finance and Development)
- Website: gridiron.org.uk

Grid Iron Theatre Company is a Scottish theatre company, one of the world's leading specialists in site-specific theatre although they also produce for the stage.

Over the 27 years the company has won 31 awards and another 20 nominations across all aspects of their work, including six awards in the Critics' Awards for Theatre in Scotland.

As a renowned specialist in site-specific theatre, the company performs in a wide variety of venues which have included a cancer hospital in Jordan, land and air-side at Edinburgh Airport, a former morgue in Cork, Mary King's Close in 1997 before it was opened up as a tourist attraction, the venue which is now run during the Fringe as The Underbelly, Edinburgh Zoo, The London Dungeon, parks, gardens, playgrounds and fields all over Britain and Ireland.

During the COVID-19 pandemic, the company created a documentary film about the preparations of what was to be an outdoor production in Gifford Community Woods in East Lothian, based on the novel by Norwegian author Erlend Loe, Doppler.

The company appears regularly at the Edinburgh Festival Fringe, and has appeared three times as part of the Edinburgh International Festival, most recently in 2022 with Muster Station: Leith, a production which took place within Leith Academy.

They have also appeared as part of the Imaginate, Edinburgh International Science Festival, Edinburgh International Book Festival, the Belfast Festival at Queens and Cork’s Fringe (now Midsummer) Festival. The company has co-produced theatre National Theatre of Scotland, The Almeida Theatre (London), the Traverse Theatre, Dundee Rep Theatre, Lung Ha Theatre Company, Stellar Quines and many others.
