= Goldilocks (disambiguation) =

Goldilocks or "Goldilocks and the Three Bears" is a 19th-century fairy tale.

Goldilocks may also refer to:

== Media and entertainment ==
- Goldilocks (comics), a supervillain in the DC universe
- Goldilocks (musical), a 1958 stage show by Jean and Walter Kerr and Leroy Anderson
- Goldilocks (film), a 1971 animated special starring Bing Crosby
  - Goldilocks (album), the soundtrack album
- "Goldilocks and the Three Bears" (Faerie Tale Theatre), an episode of Faerie Tale Theatre
- The Story of Pretty Goldilocks, a French fairy tale by Madame d'Aulnoy
- Goldilocks, a character in Fables
- Princess Goldilocks (Czech: Zlatovláska), a 1973 Czechoslovak television film
- "Goldilocks" (For All Mankind), a 2023 TV episode, of the fictional asteroid discovered in the episode
- Goldy Locks (born 1979), American singer and professional wrestler
- Goldielocks (born 2001), Finnish singer and songwriter

== Astronomy and physics ==
- Goldilocks (planet), a nickname of the extrasolar planet 70 Virginis b
- Goldilocks planet, a planet that falls within a star's habitable zone
- Goldilocks zone, the habitable region in a stellar-centered orbit
- Cosmic Jackpot or The Goldilocks Enigma: Why is the Universe Just Right for Life?, a 2007 book by Paul Davies

== Other uses ==
- Goldilocks Bakeshop, a bakeshop chain in the Philippines
- Goldilocks economy, an economy that is not too hot or cold
- Goldilocks principle, the idea that something must fall between two extremes
- Goldilocks Process, a process of initiating and sustaining systemic change
- The goldilocks buttercup, Ranunculus auricomus
- The goldilocks aster, Galatella linosyris
