= God and the New Physics =

1984 popular science book by Paul Davies

- Paperback edition
- Author: Paul Davies
- Language: English
- Subject: Physics, cosmology, philosophy, theology
- Genre: Popular science
- Publisher: J. M. Dent (UK), Simon & Schuster (US)
- Publication date: 1983 (UK), 1984 (US)
- Publication place: United Kingdom
- Media type: Print
- Pages: 272
- ISBN: 978-0-671-52806-5
- OCLC: 10477855

God and the New Physics is a 1983 book by physicist Paul Davies that explores the intersection of modern physics, cosmology, and theology. Davies contends that recent scientific advancements, particularly in quantum mechanics and cosmology, offer a more compelling path toward understanding fundamental questions of existence—such as the origin of the universe, the nature of consciousness, and the possibility of a divine creator—than traditional religious doctrines. He argues that science can provide a surer path to "God" than religion.

== Synopsis ==
In God and the New Physics, Davies confronts some of the biggest questions that have historically been addressed by philosophy and religion. He guides the reader through complex scientific theories, such as the Big Bang, quantum mechanics, and relativity, to examine their implications for metaphysics. The book explores whether the universe is a random accident or the product of intelligent design, the nature of miracles, the concept of a soul, the meaning of free will, and the physical basis of time and consciousness. Davies posits that the "new physics" is not only reshaping our understanding of the physical world but is also providing profound insights into questions once considered beyond the scope of scientific inquiry.

== Key Themes ==
The book is structured around several core themes that bridge science and theology:

- The Origin of the Universe: Davies analyzes the Big Bang as a creation event and discusses the philosophical challenges it poses, questioning what might have preceded it and whether it requires a supernatural cause.
- A 'Designer' Universe?: The book explores the fine-tuned universe argument, noting that the fundamental constants of nature appear to be precisely calibrated to allow for the emergence of life. This leads to a discussion of the anthropic principle and the possibility of a cosmic designer.
- Mind and Soul: Davies investigates the physical basis of consciousness and the self, questioning whether the concept of a soul can be reconciled with modern neurology and physics.
- Free Will and Determinism: He discusses how the indeterminacy inherent in quantum mechanics might challenge the classical, deterministic view of the universe, potentially leaving room for free will.
- Time, Reality, and Miracles: The book examines the nature of time as described by physics and how it relates to human perception. It also considers whether phenomena classified as "miracles" could have explanations within a more advanced scientific framework.

== Author's Perspective ==
Paul Davies is known for his extensive writing on the deeper philosophical implications of science. While he does not subscribe to a traditional religion, he is critical of the view that the universe is meaningless. In the book, he famously states, "it may seem bizarre, but in my opinion science offers a surer path to God than religion." This perspective positions him as a thinker who sees science not as an antagonist to faith, but as a legitimate and powerful tool for exploring the divine. For his work in this area, Davies was awarded the prestigious Templeton Prize in 1995 for "his contribution to the dialogue between science and religion."

== Critical reception ==
Upon its release, God and the New Physics was widely praised for making complex scientific ideas accessible to a general audience. Critics highlighted Davies's skill as a science communicator.

The New York Times called Davies "one of the most adept science writers on either side of the Atlantic" and praised the book, stating, "The concepts are breathtaking...the general thrust of modern physics is amazingly well described." Another review in the same publication noted Davies's ability to "synthesize a vast amount of material from physics, cosmology, computer science, and religion with elegance and economy."

Kirkus Reviews described it as "a clear, comprehensive, and dazzling survey of the new physics and its philosophical implications," concluding that it was "popular-science writing at its best."

== See also ==
- List of books by Paul Davies
- The Mind of God (a follow-up book by Davies)
- About Time
- Physics and religion
