= Manuae (Cook Islands) =

Atoll of the Cook Islands

Coordinates: 19°15′27″S 158°56′20″W

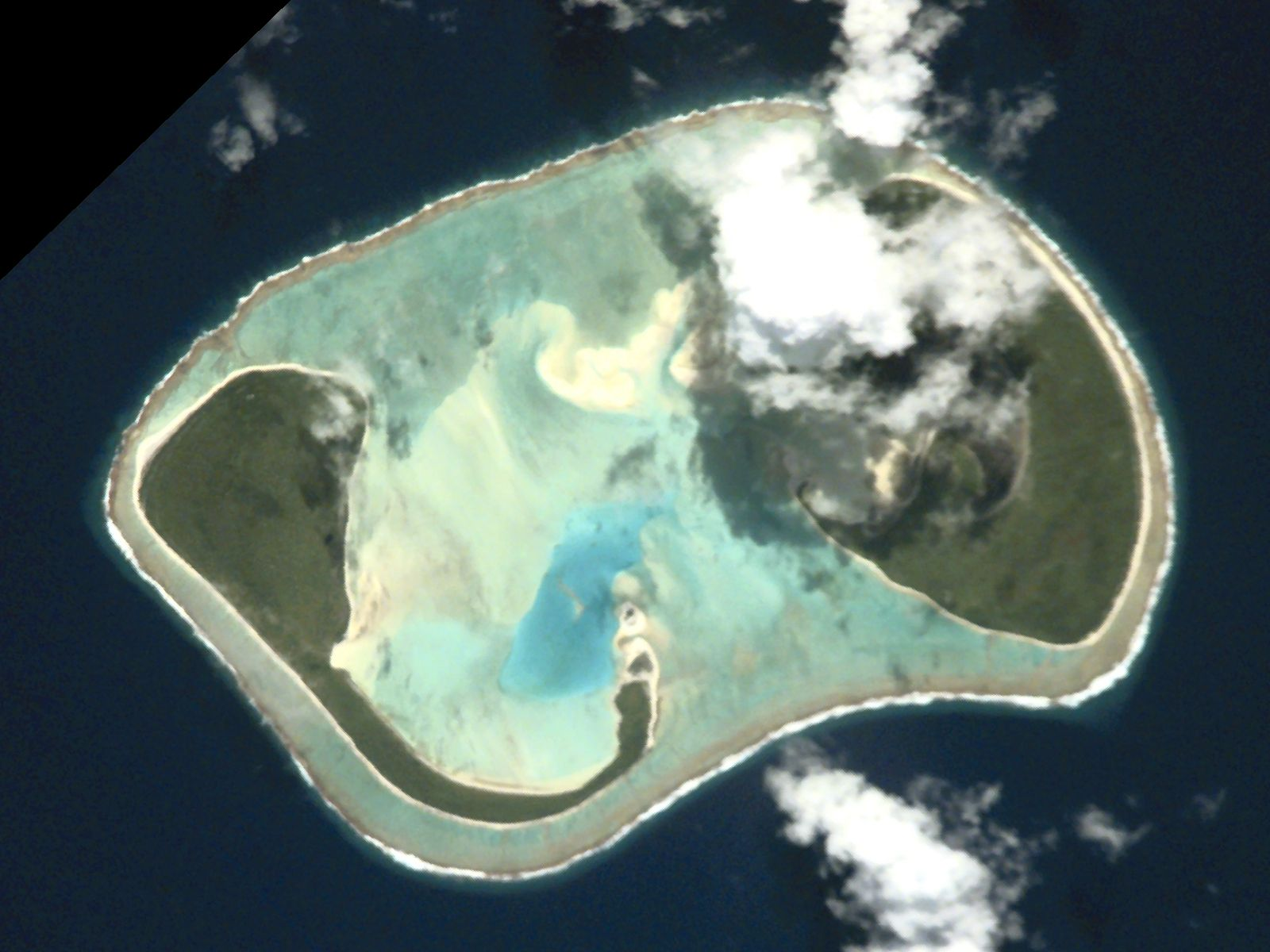
- An aerial view of Manuae

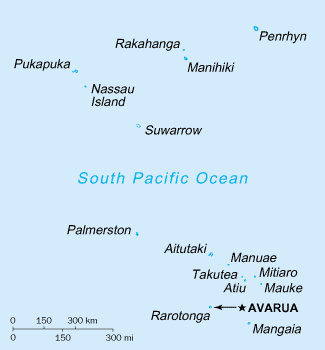

Geography
- Area: 6.17 km^{2} (2.38 sq mi)
- Highest elevation: 5 m (16 ft)

Administration
- Cook Islands

Demographics
- Population: 0 (2021)

Manuae is an uninhabited atoll in the southern group of the Cook Islands, 100 kilometres south-east of Aitutaki. Manuae is not administratively part of Aitutaki, however, it is part of Arutanga-Reureu-Nikaupara Constituency on Aitutaki for electoral purposes only.

== Geographic description ==
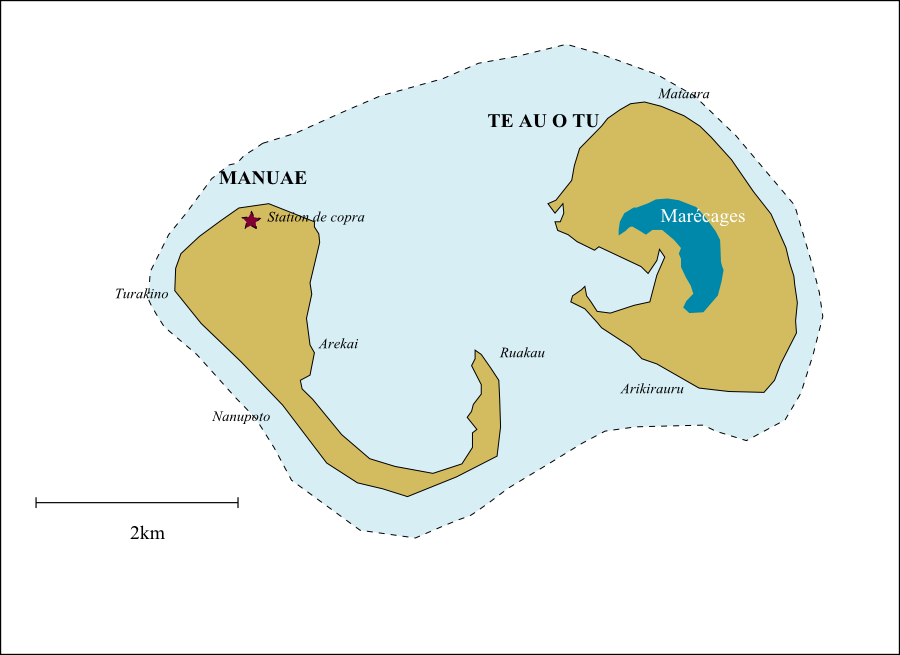
Map of Manuae

Manuae is a true atoll sitting on the peak of a submerged volcano which descends over 4000 meters to the ocean bed. It comprises two horseshoe-shaped islets, Manuae islet to the west and Te Au O Tu islet to the east, with a total area of 6 km^{2} on either side of a lagoon about 7 km x 4 km. Manuae islet has an area of 2.1 km^{2}, while Te Au O Tu islet is 3.9 km^{2}. The lagoon is 13 km^{2} in size, shallow and subject to large shifting sand banks. A coral reef surrounds the atoll, and there is no major passage through the reef.

The waters surrounding the island are a marine park and it is an important breeding ground for seabirds and marine turtles in the Central Pacific. The offshore waters of Manuae are good fishing grounds.

== History ==
According to oral tradition, Manuae was discovered by Ruatapu, who named it Manu-enua ("bird-land"). Ruatapu planted coconuts and released birds there, and later sent his second son and his family to settle the island. Another tradition states that the island was first settled by two brothers from Atiu, and that Ruatapu found it already inhabited. Later the island was attacked by Mangaia.

Captain James Cook sighted Manuae on his second voyage on 23 September 1773, but did not land. He visited again on 6 April 1777 during his third voyage, and found the island inhabited and apparently under the control of an Ariki from Atiu. Cook initially named Manuae "Sandwich Island", but changed it to "Hervey Island" in honor of Augustus Hervey, 3rd Earl of Bristol, then a Lord of the Admiralty. This name was later corrupted to Hervey's Island, or Hervey's Isle, and later applied to the entire southern group, as the Hervey Islands.

In July 1823 the island was visited by John Williams of the London Missionary Society, who found it inhabited by sixty people. The island was depopulated shortly afterwards, and by 1852 was home to a single family. In 1888 it was declared to be a British protectorate. In 1898 it was leased out as a copra plantation. In 1900 it was annexed by New Zealand.

In April/May 1965 the population briefly increased to more than a hundred when the island was visited by six expeditions (from Australia, N.Z., Japan, U.K., U.S.A. and U.S.S.R.) to observe the total solar eclipse of 30 May 1965.

Norwegian author Erlend Loe writes humorously about an expedition to Manuae in his 1999 novel "L".

In April 2020 the Cook Islands National Environment Service advertised for two caretakers to live on the island for a year.

The Proprietors of Manuae Incorporated (PMI) were established by court order in 1983. The committee members are elected by the indigenous landowners of Manuae Atoll on a regular basis. In October 2022, the PMI established the not-for-profit Manuae Enua Conservation Trust (MECT) to represent the landowners’ interests in managing the island of Manuae for conservation action and sustainable development.

== Economy and improvements ==
The island once supported a copra industry with a settlement established next to the small reef passage less than one kilometer northeast of Turakino, the westernmost point of the atoll. The passage, at the sea entrance, is less than 4 metres wide and in a swell is exceedingly dangerous without local knowledge.

The island has an airfield, an overgrown coral airstrip barely visible, that has been out of use for several years.

Fishermen from Aitutaki occasionally organise trips to Manuae.

== Demography ==
The population peaked with 32 at the 1956 census, but twenty years later the island was abandoned.

Historical population

| Year | Pop. | ±% |
|---|---|---|
| 1926 | 23 | — |
| 1936 | 8 | −65.2% |
| 1956 | 32 | +300.0% |
| 1961 | 18 | −43.8% |

| Year | Pop. | ±% |
|---|---|---|
| 1966 | 16 | −11.1% |
| 1971 | 2 | −87.5% |
| 1976 | 0 | −100.0% |

Papers Past

== See also ==
- Desert island
- Lists of islands
