= Paul Davies =

English physicist, writer and broadcaster (born 1946)

Paul Davies AM
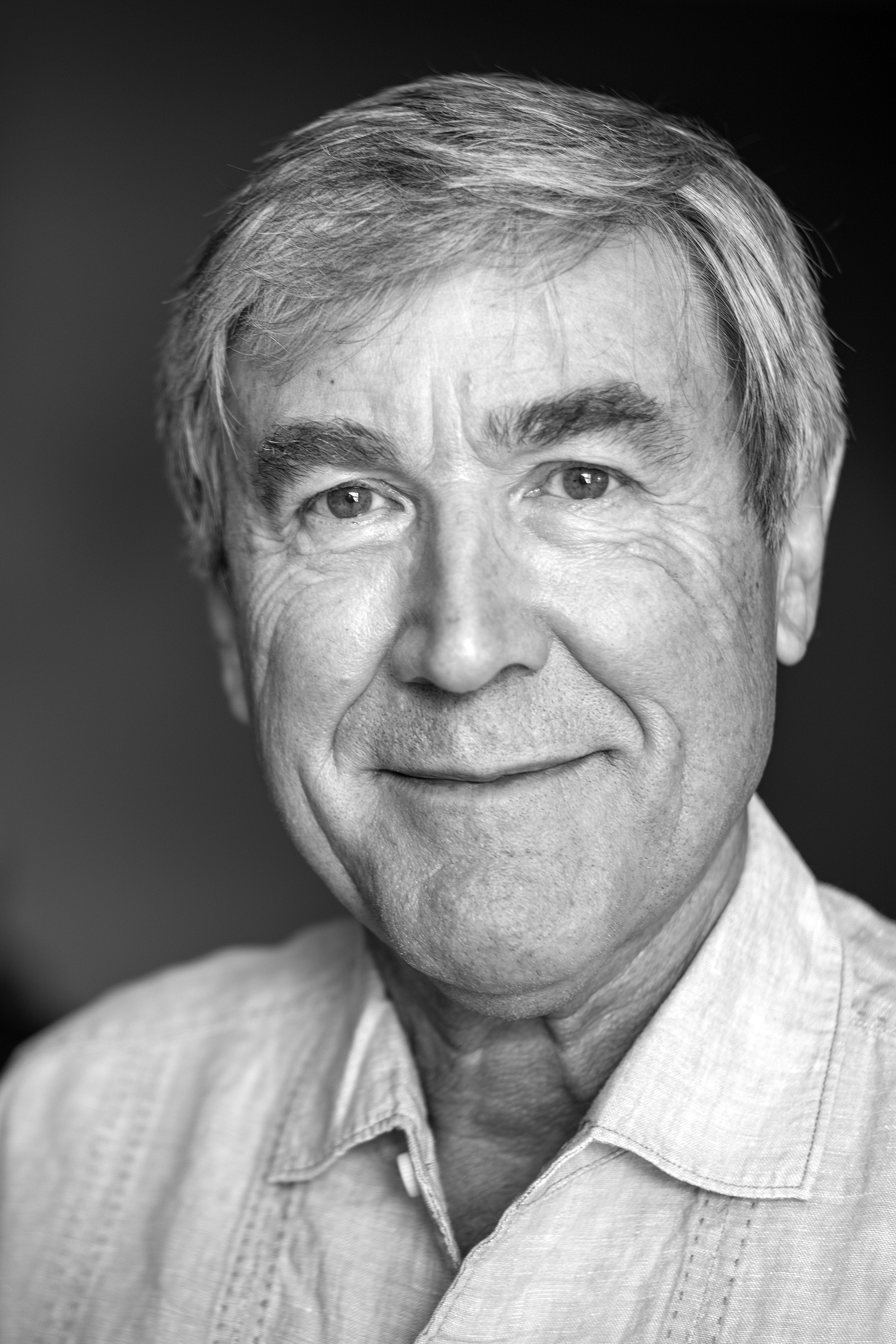
- Davies in 2016
- Born: Paul Charles William Davies; 22 April 1946 (age 80); London, United Kingdom
- Education: University College London
- Known for: Fulling–Davies–Unruh effect Bunch–Davies vacuum state Davies-Fulling "moving mirror" model
- Awards: Templeton Prize (1995); Kelvin Medal (2001); Faraday Prize (2002); Klumpke-Roberts Award (2011)
- Scientific career
- Fields: Physics
- Workplaces: Arizona State University; University College London; University of Cambridge; King's College London; University of Adelaide; Macquarie University; Newcastle University
- Thesis: Contributions to Theoretical Physics: (i) Radiation Damping in the Optical Continuum; (ii) A Quantum Theory of Wheeler–Feynman Electrodynamics (1970)
- Doctoral advisors: M. J. Seaton; Sigurd Zienau
- Other academic advisors: Fred Hoyle (postdoctoral advisor)
- Notable students: Sara Imari Walker; Edmund Copeland
- Website: cosmos.asu.edu

Paul Charles William Davies AM (born 22 April 1946) is an English physicist and science populariser. He is a professor in Arizona State University and director of BEYOND: Center for Fundamental Concepts in Science. He is affiliated with the Institute for Quantum Studies in Chapman University in California. He previously held academic appointments in the University of Cambridge, University College London, King's College London, University of Newcastle upon Tyne, University of Adelaide and Macquarie University. His research interests are in the fields of cosmology, quantum field theory, and astrobiology.

In 2005, he took up the chair of the SETI: Post-Detection Science and Technology Taskgroup of the International Academy of Astronautics. Davies serves on the Advisory Council of METI (Messaging Extraterrestrial Intelligence). Davies was a co-author with Felisa Wolfe-Simon on the 2011 Science article "A Bacterium That Can Grow by Using Arsenic Instead of Phosphorus". The article has been retracted.

== Education ==
Born on 22 April 1946, Davies was brought up in Finchley, London. He attended Woodhouse Grammar School and studied physics at University College London, gaining a Bachelor of Science degree with first-class honours in 1967.

In 1970, he completed his PhD under the supervision of Michael J. Seaton and Sigurd Zienau at University College London. He carried out postdoctoral research under Fred Hoyle in the University of Cambridge.

== Scientific research ==
Davies's research interests are theoretical physics, cosmology and astrobiology; his research has been mainly in the area of quantum field theory in curved spacetime.

His notable contributions are the Fulling–Davies–Unruh effect, according to which an observer accelerating through empty space will be subject to a bath of induced thermal radiation, and the Bunch–Davies vacuum state, often used as the basis for explaining the fluctuations in the cosmic microwave background left over from the Big Bang. A paper co-authored with Stephen Fulling and William Unruh was the first to suggest that black holes evaporating via the Hawking effect lose mass as a result of a flux of negative energy streaming into the hole from the surrounding space.

Davies has had a longstanding association with the problem of time's arrow, and has also identified the mystery of 'dark energy' as one of the most important issues facing fundamental science. Davies was also an early proponent of the theory that life on Earth may have come from Mars cocooned in rocks ejected by asteroid and comet impacts. He is also a propagator of scientific research and technology development in order to prevent future comet impacts threatening the development or existence of humankind. He proposed that a one-way trip to Mars could be a viable option in the future. During his time in Australia he helped establish the Australian Centre for Astrobiology.

Davies was a co-author on the 2011 Science article "A Bacterium That Can Grow by Using Arsenic Instead of Phosphorus". Reports refuting the most significant aspects of the original results were published in the same journal in 2012. Following the publication of the articles challenging the conclusions of the original Science article first describing GFAJ-1, the website Retraction Watch argued that the original article should be retracted because of misrepresentation of critical data. The article has been retracted.

Davies is an outreach investigator at Arizona State University's Center for Convergence of Physical Science and Cancer Biology. This is part of a program set up by the National Institutes of Health's National Cancer Institute to involve physicists in cancer research which has set up a network of 12 Physical Sciences-Oncology Centers.

== Awards ==
Davies received the Templeton Prize in 1995. He was elected a Fellow of the Royal Society of Literature in 1999. Davies's talent as a communicator of science has been recognized in Australia by an Advance Australia Award and two Eureka Prizes, and in the UK by the 2001 Kelvin Medal and Prize by the Institute of Physics, and the 2002 Faraday Prize by The Royal Society. Davies was made a member of the Order of Australia in the 2007 Queen's birthday honours list.

The minor planet 6870 Pauldavies is named after him.

== Media work ==
Davies writes and comments on scientific and philosophical issues. He made a documentary series for BBC Radio 3, and two Australian television series, The Big Questions and More Big Questions. His BBC documentary The Cradle of Life featured the subject of his Faraday Prize lecture. He writes regularly for newspapers and magazines worldwide. He has been guest on numerous radio and television programmes including the children's podcast programme Ask A Biologist.

A 2007 opinion piece "Taking Science on Faith" in The New York Times, explored of the role of faith in scientific inquiry. Davies argued that the faith scientists have in the immutability of physical laws has origins in Christian theology, and that the claim that science is "free of faith" is "manifestly bogus". Edge.org presented a criticism of Davies's article written by Jerry Coyne, Nathan Myhrvold, Lawrence Krauss, Scott Atran, Sean Carroll, Jeremy Bernstein, PZ Myers, Lee Smolin, John Horgan, Alan Sokal and a response by Davies beginning "I was dismayed at how many of my detractors completely misunderstood what I had written. Indeed, their responses bore the hallmarks of a superficial knee-jerk reaction to the sight of the words 'science' and 'faith' juxtaposed." Atheists Richard Dawkins and Victor J. Stenger have criticised Davies's public stance on science and religion. The John Templeton Foundation has praised his work.

Davies wrote an article in The Wall Street Journal describing the background to the December 2010 arsenic bacteria press conference and stating that he supported the finding of Felisa Wolfe-Simon that arsenic can replace phosphorus because "I had the advantage of being unencumbered by knowledge. I dropped chemistry at the age of 16, and all I knew about arsenic came from Agatha Christie novels." He also made the statement, "Well, I would be astonished if this was the only arsenic-based organism on Earth and Felisa just happened to scrape it up from the bottom of Mono Lake on the first try, It's quite clear that it is the tip of an iceberg. I think it's a window into a whole new world of microbiology. And as a matter of fact, she already has 20 or so candidate other organisms that we're very anxious to take a look at. I think we're going to see a whole new domain of life here." It was later independently demonstrated that the organism's DNA contained no arsenic at all. Concerns have been raised about his responsibility as one of Wolfe-Simon's co-authors.

== In popular culture ==
- The 1996 novel Naive, Super, by Norwegian writer Erlend Loe (translated by Tor Ketil Solberg), refers to Davies frequently.
- Numbers (season 5, episode 12) refers to Paul Davies's Cosmic Think Tank at Arizona State.
- In Lawrence Leung's Unbelievable (season 1, episode 3), Leung interviews Paul Davies about alien abduction, and Davies discusses having experienced sleep paralysis.
- Through the Wormhole, season 3, episode 1 "Will We Survive First Contact?"
- Through the Wormhole, season 6
- The 2013 novel The Extinction Machine, by American writer Jonathan Maberry, refers to Paul Davies.

== Works ==
=== Popular science books ===
- 1974 The Physics of Time Asymmetry, University of California Press, Berkeley, California, ISBN 0-520-03247-0
- 1978 The Runaway Universe, Penguin Books, ISBN 0-460-04286-6
- 1979 Stardoom, HarperCollins Publishers Ltd, ISBN 0-00-635318-5
- 1979 The Forces of Nature, Cambridge University Press, ISBN 0-521-31392-9
- 1980 Other Worlds, Touchstone/Simon and Schuster, ISBN 0-460-04400-1
- 1980 The Search for Gravity Waves, Cambridge University Press, ISBN 0-521-23197-3
- 1981 The Edge of Infinity, Penguin USA, ISBN 0-14-023194-3
- 1982 The Accidental Universe, Cambridge University Press, ISBN 0-521-28692-1
- 1982 Quantum Fields in Curved Space, (with N.D. Birrell), Cambridge University Press, ISBN 0-521-27858-9
- 1983 God and the New Physics, Simon & Schuster, ISBN 0-14-022550-1
- 1984 Superforce, Touchstone, ISBN 0-04-539006-1
- 1986 The Ghost in the Atom, Cambridge University Press, ISBN 0-521-31316-3
- 1987 The Cosmic Blueprint, Simon & Schuster, ISBN 0-04-440182-5
- 1988 Superstrings: A Theory of Everything, Cambridge University Press, ISBN 0-521-35741-1
- 1989 The New Physics, Cambridge University Press, ISBN 0-521-30420-2
- 1991 The Matter Myth, Simon & Schuster, ISBN 0-670-83585-4
- 1992 The Mind of God, Simon & Schuster UK, ISBN 0-671-71069-9
- 1994 The Last Three Minutes, Basic Books, ISBN 1-85799-336-5
- 1995 Are We Alone?, Basic Books, ISBN 0-14-025179-0
- 1995 About Time: Einstein's Unfinished Revolution, Penguin Books, Simon & Schuster, ISBN 0-670-84761-5
- 1998 The Fifth Miracle: The Search for the Origin and Meaning of Life. New York: Simon and Schuster. ISBN 0-684-83799-4
- 2002 How to Build a Time Machine, Penguin Books, ISBN 0-14-100534-3
- 2003 The Origin of Life, Penguin Books, ISBN 0-14-101302-8
- 2007 The Goldilocks Enigma, also under the title Cosmic Jackpot, Houghton Mifflin Harcourt, ISBN 0-14-102326-0
- 2008 Quantum Aspects of Life (eds. Derek Abbott, Paul C. W. Davies, and Arun K. Pati, with foreword by Sir Roger Penrose), Imperial College Press, ISBN 1-84816-267-7
- 2010 The Eerie Silence, Houghton Mifflin Harcourt, ISBN 1-4001-6551-2
- 2010 Information and the Nature of Reality: From Physics to Metaphysics, Cambridge University Press, ISBN 978-0-521-76225-0
- 2019 The Demon in the Machine, Allen Lane, ISBN 978-0241309599
- 2021 What's Eating The Universe? (And Other Cosmic Questions), Allen Lane, ISBN 978-0-241-45985-0
- 2025 Quantum 2.0: The Past, Present, and Future of Quantum Physics, Pelican, ISBN 978-0-241-65580-1

=== Technical books ===
- 1974 The Physics of Time Asymmetry, University of California Press, Berkeley California,
- 1982 (with N. D. Birrell) Quantum Fields in Curved Space, Series: Cambridge Monographs on Mathematical Physics, Cambridge University Press.
- 1984 Quantum Mechanics, (with David S. Betts), 2nd edition, CRC Press, 1994.

=== Essays and papers ===
- "Are We Alone in the Universe?" in The New York Times, 18 November 2013.
- "Taking Science on Faith" in The New York Times, 24 November 2007.
- "What Happened Before the Big Bang?" in God for the 21st Century, Russell Stannard ed., Templeton Foundation Press, 2000, ISBN 1-890151-39-4
- Davies, P.C.W. (2012). "Footprints of alien technology". Acta Astronautica. 73: 250–257. Bibcode:2012AcAau..73..250D. doi:10.1016/j.actaastro.2011.06.022.
