= Cosmic Jackpot =

2007 book by Paul Davies

The Goldilocks Enigma: Why is the Universe Just Right for Life? (Cosmic Jackpot)
- Cover
- Author: Paul Davies
- Language: English
- Subject: Physics
- Publisher: Penguin Group
- Publication date: 2007
- Publication place: United Kingdom
- Media type: Print
- Pages: 242
- ISBN: 978-0-618-59226-5
- OCLC: 70775587
- Dewey Decimal: 523.1/2 22
- LC Class: BS651 .D325 2007

Cosmic Jackpot, also published under the title The Goldilocks Enigma: Why is the Universe Just Right for Life?, is a 2007 non-fiction book by physicist and cosmologist Paul Davies, describing the idea of a fine-tuned universe.

== The Enigma ==
In Cosmic Jackpot, Davies argues that certain universal fundamental physical constants are precisely adjusted to make life in the Universe possible: that we have, in a sense, won a "cosmic jackpot," and that conditions are "just right" for life, as in The Story of the Three Bears. As Davies writes elsewhere, "There is now broad agreement among physicists and cosmologists that the universe is in several respects 'fine-tuned' for life."

After explaining this enigma, Davies discusses possible solutions, such as the anthropic principle, the idea of a multiverse which contains many different universes (including our "just right" one), and the idea of intelligent design.

== The Multiverse ==
Davies also discusses a number of other ideas connected with the "multiverse." Much like a pencil falling to the ground from its tip in a trade off of symmetry for stability, Davies writes that the Big Bang could have established a complex but stable universe (or multiverse) from symmetry breaking as the heat radiation in "space" lowered abruptly past the Curie Point.

== See also ==
- The Mind of God
- God and the New Physics
- About Time
