= Top shelf =

Top shelf may refer to:

- Pornographic magazine (also a top shelf magazine), magazine that contains content of an explicitly sexual nature
- Top Shelf Productions, an American publishing company
- Top-shelf liquor, a term used in marketing to describe higher-priced alcoholic beverages
- Topshelf Records, an American independent record label
- Thee Top Shelf, a short-lived and popular barter-based "speakeasy" type bar located in Sacramento's Alahambra Triangle neighborhood between 2000 and 2004. Famous for its adherence to vinyl-formatted soundscape and a strict baseball- or C-SPAN-only live television policy (with other ambient video provided by blaxploitation and other vintage feeds). Its kitchen was also renowned for its genuine gumbos and five-alarm chilis.
