= Good–better–best =

Tiered pricing strategy

Good–better–best pricing, also known as Goldilocks pricing, is a tiered pricing strategy in which variations of a product or service are offered at multiple price levels. The approach typically presents three options, basic ("good"), mid-range ("better"), and premium ("best"), to influence consumer choice and increase overall revenue.

== Consumer behavior ==
The "good" option is typically a basic, no frills product which has few features, but which is accessible to more buyers because of its low price. The "best" option is typically a premium product which has the most features and a high price, and which is sometimes considered a luxury good. Offering a middle, "better" option invokes the Goldilocks principle, in which consumers may reason that they can spend more money than the "good" option costs, but that they do not need the premium features of the "best" option.

Companies selling a particular good had traditionally relied on a demand curve to identify an ideal price. This created a Catch-22 in which a good with only one price would exclude buyers who would not pay the single price, and it would also sacrifice profits if a less price sensitive customer were able to pay more for a premium version. In addition, a lower-priced good can generate additional ancillary revenue for the seller through further revenue streams; for example, in 2018, an iPhone SE cost about one-third as much as Apple's flagship iPhone X did, but Apple could continue to sell content, services, and accessories to a buyer of the less expensive phone.

Good–better–best pricing takes advantage of consumers' anchoring bias; for example, when Williams-Sonoma sold a bread machine for $279, then introduced a premium bread machine for $429, the premium machine did not sell well, but the original model's sales almost doubled, because customers reasoned that the $279 model was a better value. In addition, the "best" option creates a halo effect, such as when Patrón's introduction of premium tequila caused its lower-priced tequilas to also increase in sales, due to improved customer sentiment about the brand.

== Examples ==
Sears often used the good–better–best strategy in its mail-order catalog, for products such as Craftsman tools. In the 2000s, Sears and Kmart, which were owned by the same parent company, included celebrity brands like Martha Stewart Living and Ty Pennington Style in their good–better–best tiers. Similarly, in 2009, J.C. Penney announced that it would include brands by Cindy Crawford and Chris Madden in its "better" tier, supporting American Living by Ralph Lauren in the "best" tier.

At bars, customers often have a choice between rail drinks with the bar's choice of inexpensive liquor, "call" drinks with the patron's choice of moderately-priced liquor, or "top shelf" drinks with a premium brand of liquor. At the point of purchase, a bartender may be able to upsell a customer from good to better, or from better to best, if the price differential is small and if the customer is in a good mood.

Consumer packaged goods companies, like Kraft Foods, have attempted to improve sales by adopting good–better–best strategies to broaden their appeal with basic and premium products targeting the low- and high-income consumer.

Economy class air travel, long considered a single class of service, has been diversified into basic economy class, economy class, and premium economy class. Airlines have found that over 50% of consumers who start at a lower price end up upgrading to a higher price.

Some companies have quietly increased consumer prices by lowering prices on basic models while simultaneously introducing new, premium models at higher prices. For example, Peloton Interactive lowered the price of its basic stationary bicycle from $2,245 to $1,895, and also introduced a new premium bike for $2,495. One jewelry sales consultant advised retailers introducing good–better–best pricing to set their "better" price about 10% higher than a product's average sales price, with "good" prices about 25% lower, and "best" prices no more than 50% higher.

== Risks ==
A common pitfall of good–better–best is cannibalization, where customers who could afford the "better" option instead opt for the "good" option to save money. Marketers discourage customers from downgrading by implementing "fence attributes," such as by making "good" hotel rates non-refundable, or by making the least expensive concert tickets general admission, with no assigned seats.

Some sales professionals discourage a good–better–best strategy for being non-specific and non-targeted to a particular customer, instead recommending that salespeople select and offer one pricing tier based on the customer's needs. Customers may be annoyed by price partitioning, especially when the "good" offering appears to be inexpensive, but then includes many fees and limitations, as happens with the basic airfares of low-cost carriers. This risks creating resentful customers who do not return.
