= L (novel) =

1999 Norwegian novel

- 1st (Norwegian) edition
- Author: Erlend Loe
- Language: Norwegian
- Genre: Novel, satire
- Published: 1999

L is a 1999 novel by Norwegian writer Erlend Loe. It follows a group of young men on an expedition to the small island of Manuae in the Pacific Ocean.

== Plot ==
The novel parodies Thor Heyerdahl's Kon-Tiki expedition. The main character, Erlend, believes Pacific islanders originally came from South America on skates and organizes an expedition to prove it.

The book is divided into two parts. The first follows Erlend as he develops his theory and plans the trip. The second covers the expedition itself on Manuae in the Cook Islands. The seven participants, including fictionalized versions of Loe and artist Kim Hiorthøy, feel they have not contributed to building Norway; the expedition is their attempt to make amends and bring Norway international recognition. Erlend believes they will return as heroes.

At the end of the book, dissatisfied with their results, the group experiments with different forms of government on the island, including apartheid and communism. They spend their final days waiting for the boat. When they return home, no one is waiting at the airport.
