= How to Build a Time Machine =

Book by Paul Davies

- Author: Paul Davies
- Language: English
- Genre: Non-fiction
- Publisher: Viking
- Publication date: 2002
- Media type: Print
- Pages: 131 pp.
- ISBN: 0670030635

How to Build a Time Machine by Paul Davies is a 2002 physics book that discusses the possibilities of time travel. It was published by Penguin Books.

== Synopsis ==
In this book, Davies discusses why time is relative, how this relates to time travel, and then lays out a "blueprint" for a real time machine. This is explored whilst also discussing paradoxes which allow a more constructive approach. It is a realistic, albeit fantastical, book.

== Critical reception ==
In Kirkus Reviews the reviewer noted that this volume allowed "Davies to wax eloquent on concepts he has covered in earlier works: general relativity, quantum mechanics, black holes, virtual matter (non-empty vacuums), parallel universes, as well as assorted time paradoxes."

== See also ==
- About Time
