= Bård Løken =

Norwegian photographer

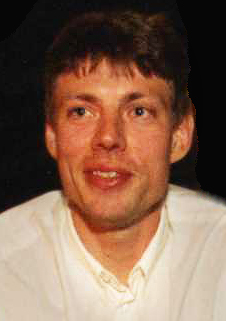
Bård Løken

Bård Løken (born 6 February 1964 in Vadsø) is a Norwegian photographer, living in Elverum.

He has worked as a photographer since 1985. He has taken pictures for a number of books, and worked with some of Norway's best known authors since the start of the 1990s. Løken mainly deals with nature and landscape photography. He has also been picture editor for the last four issues of NAF Veibok.

Løken is a member of Norske Naturfotografer and signed to the picture agency Samfoto .

== Bibliography ==
- Oslomarka – Årstidene, naturen, stemningene, Ernst G. Mortensens forlag, Oslo (1993) ISBN 82-527-1131-6
- Markaboka (with Jørn Areklett Omre), Orion Forlag, Oslo (1995)
- Jotunheimen, bill.mrk. 2469 (with Erlend Loe), Orion Forlag, Oslo (2000) ISBN 82-458-0425-8
- Med kamera i naturen, Naturforlaget, Oslo (2001) ISBN 82-7643-183-6
- Norway: facing the north (with Trym Ivar Bergsmo), Culture and art publishing house, Beijing, China (2001) ISBN 7-5039-1981-7
- Norske omveier – i blues og bilder (with Lars Saabye Christensen), Orion Forlag, Oslo (2005) ISBN 82-458-0738-9
- Inn i naturen (with Jan Chr Næss), Damm, Oslo (2007) ISBN 978-82-04-12983-3
- Naturlig rik (with Mia Svagård, Arne Næss and Henry D. Thoreau), Tun forlag, Oslo (2007) ISBN 978-82-7643-459-0
- Industrispor (with various authors), Aschehoug forlag, Oslo (2008) ISBN 978-82-03-23606-8
- Hedmark i dikt og bilder (with Jørn Areklett Omre, editor Knut Imerslund), Kom Forlag, Oslo (2009) ISBN 978-82-92496-75-6
