= Rule of 40 =

Financial heuristic

The Rule of 40 is a financial heuristic used to measure the performance and health of software as a service (SaaS) companies. It states that a SaaS company's annual revenue growth rate and its profit margin should add up to 40% or more.

The rule provides a high-level view of a company's sustainability by balancing two competing objectives: growth and profitability. It is widely used by venture capitalists, public market investors, and company executives to assess the trade-offs in capital allocation and strategy, particularly in determining whether to invest more heavily in growth or to focus on operational efficiency.

== Formula ==
In corporate finance, the Rule of 40 is represented by the following inequality:

$$\text{Growth Rate} \, (\%) + \text{Profit Margin} \, (\%) \ge 40\%.$$

=== Growth rate ===
The growth rate is typically the year-over-year (YoY) growth in revenue. For SaaS companies, this is most often calculated using annual recurring revenue (ARR) or monthly recurring revenue (MRR).

$$\text{Growth Rate} = \frac{\text{Revenue}_t - \text{Revenue}_{t-1}}{\text{Revenue}_{t-1}} \times 100.$$

where $\text{Revenue}_t$ is the revenue in the current period and $\text{Revenue}_{t-1}$ is the revenue in the previous period.

=== Profit margin ===
The definition of "profit margin" can vary, which is a nuance in applying the rule. The two most common metrics used are the EBITDA margin and the free cash flow (FCF) margin. The EBITDA margin—representing earnings before interest, taxes, depreciation, and amortization as a percentage of revenue—is frequently used as a proxy for operational cash flow. Alternatively, many investors prefer the FCF margin, which measures the cash a company generates after accounting for capital expenditures to support operations and maintain assets. The FCF margin is often considered less susceptible to accounting adjustments and represents the actual cash available to the business. The choice of profitability metric can significantly alter the outcome, making consistent application essential for comparisons.

== Interpretation ==
The Rule of 40 allows for flexibility in a company's strategy. A company can achieve the 40% benchmark through combinations, as summarized in the table below:

Examples of corporate combinations meeting the Rule of 40
Strategy	Example growth rate	Example profit margin	Combined score	Typical company focus
High growth, low profitability	60%	–20%	40%	Early-stage expansion, market capture
Moderate growth, moderate profitability	20%	20%	40%	Mature, balanced operations
Low growth, high profitability	5%	35%	40%	Market leader, cash flow maximization

A company's operational strategy typically evolves through these combinations as the business matures. Earlier-stage companies in a high-growth phase aggressively invest in sales, marketing, and product development to capture market share, often resulting in high growth rates offset by negative profit margins. As the business matures, it usually transitions toward a balanced approach, matching moderate growth with moderate profitability. Finally, market leaders in mature niches often focus on maximizing cash flow rather than expansion, meeting the rule through low growth and high profit margins.

A company that falls below the 40% threshold is typically scrutinized by investors, as it suggests that its growth is insufficient relative to its investment rate or that its business model lacks operational efficiency.

== Strategic implications ==
The Rule of 40 is not just a backward-looking metric but also a forward-looking tool. Studies have shown a strong correlation between a company's Rule of 40 score and its valuation multiple. Companies that consistently outperform the 40% benchmark tend to achieve premium valuations. Management teams use the rule to guide decisions on capital allocation. For example, if a company's score is well above 40%, management may allocate more capital to growth. If the score is below 40%, the focus typically shifts toward improving operational efficiency, optimizing pricing, or reducing customer churn.

== History ==
The Rule of 40 gained prominence in the mid-2010s within the venture capital community. While its origin is debated, it was popularized by investors like Brad Feld as a simple way to evaluate the health of their SaaS portfolio companies. Its simplicity has led to its broad adoption in both private and public markets for valuing software businesses.

== Criticism and limitations ==
While widely used, the Rule of 40 is a heuristic rather than a law, and it has several limitations. First, the 40% figure is an arbitrary benchmark that may not suit all market conditions. During expansionary bull markets, investors often prioritize growth and accept lower combined scores, whereas contractionary bear markets demand a greater emphasis on profitability and cash flow. Second, the lack of a standardized definition for "profit margin" (often varying between EBITDA, FCF, and net income) can lead to inconsistent application and "metric shopping" to artificially inflate the score.

Additionally, the rule is less applicable across different company lifecycles and industries. It is highly irrelevant for early-stage startups, where rapid growth is the singular focus and margins are deeply negative; it is far more appropriate for venture-growth and later-stage companies. Furthermore, the heuristic does not apply equally to all software sub-sectors, as companies in highly capital-intensive or competitive niches may require different baseline metrics. Finally, as a purely quantitative measure, the Rule of 40 does not account for qualitative factors such as revenue quality, product stickiness, or the size of the addressable market.

== See also ==
- Customer acquisition cost (CAC)
- Financial ratio
- Lifetime value (LTV)
