= Naïve. Super =

1996 Norwegian novel by Erlend Loe

- First (Norwegian) edition
- Author: Erlend Loe
- Original title: Naiv.Super.
- Translator: Tor Ketil Solberg
- Language: Norwegian
- Genre: Philosophical fiction
- Published: 1996
- Publication place: Norway
- Media type: Print
- Pages: 208
- ISBN: 1841956724
- OCLC: 49239720

Naïve. Super. (Original title: Naiv.Super.) is a novel by the Norwegian author Erlend Loe. It was first published in 1996 in Norwegian, and proved to be very popular. In 2006, it was on the newspaper Dagbladet's list of the best Norwegian novels 1981–2006. The novel has since been translated into more than 30 other languages. Tor Ketil Solberg translated the novel into English.

== Plot synopsis ==
The story is narrated by a man in his mid-twenties who suddenly becomes disillusioned and confused by life and therefore quits university. The narrator becomes fascinated by modern scientific theories of both time and relativity. He reads a book by Paul Davies, exchanges faxes with his meteorologist friend Kim, and also engages in repetitive childish activities such as playing with wooden BRIO children's toys and repeatedly throwing a ball against a wall. In the end, the narrator visits his brother in New York City and returns to Norway with a renewed sense of meaning in life.

While the narrator's name remains unknown throughout the novel, the author uses his own name at the end of the book, raising questions about the true narrative standpoint throughout the text.

== Chapters ==
The novel is broken up into 45 chapters, each approximately 4-5 pages in length.
