= The Eerie Silence =

2010 book by Paul Davies

- Paperback edition
- Author: Paul Davies
- Language: English
- Subject: Astronomy and astrobiology
- Genre: Non-fiction; science text
- Publisher: Houghton Mifflin Harcourt
- Publication date: 2010
- Publication place: United Kingdom
- Media type: Print, e-book
- Pages: 242 pp.
- ISBN: 978-0547133249

The Eerie Silence: Renewing Our Search for Alien Intelligence is a 2010 popular science book by Paul Davies, chair of the SETI: Post-Detection Science and Technology Taskgroup of the International Academy of Astronautics. The Eerie Silence explores the possibilities of intelligent extraterrestrial life, and its potential consequences.

== Contents ==
=== Chapter 1: Is Anybody Out There? ===
In this chapter, Davies goes over the history of aliens as conceived by humanity, culminating in a discussion about SETI. He makes the point that SETI is science, despite opposing views in the public. Various possibilities for a habitable zone are mentioned, and Davies also debunks various UFO stories.

=== Chapter 2: Life: Freak Side-Show or Cosmic Imperative? ===
Here, Davies debates the point of whether life is common in the universe. He discusses two opposing viewpoints: that of Christian de Duve, which is that life will inevitably arise on Earth-like planets given enough time, and that of Jacques Monod, which is that life has only arisen once in the universe, on Earth.

=== Chapter 3: A Shadow Biosphere ===
Davies discusses the possibility of multiple biospheres on Earth which evolved separately from normal life, which would be strong evidence for life being a cosmic imperative. He gives several examples of possible shadow lifeforms, as well as various methods to search for them.

=== Chapter 4: How Much Intelligence is Out There? ===
In this chapter, Davies analyzes the probability of intelligent life arising on an Earth-like planet and communicating with us. His discussion is centered around the Drake Equation.

=== Chapter 5: New SETI: Widening the Search ===
Davies argues for a new search method for SETI, which would be less anthropocentric but at the same time scientifically eliminating various uninhabitable regions. He also discusses whether or not we have already received signals from extraterrestrials, but have not yet discovered them.

In this chapter, Davies brings up an interesting theory about habitability on the Galactic Plane. The theory is as such: the Solar System moves up and down relative to the Galactic Plane, in a cycle of 62 million years, wandering 230 light years out of the plane as a result. According to Richard Muller and Robert Rohde, this cycle closely matches that of marine extinctions in the past 542 million years. The death rate is highest when the Solar System is located at a maximum distance from the galactic plane in the direction of galactic north and lowest when it is down south.

An explanation for this has been proposed by Mikhail Medvedev and Adrian Melott. They point out that the galactic halo is not symmetric between north and south. The galaxy emits a wind that consists of protons and other charged particles, creating a cloud that extends into intergalactic space but is lopsided towards the south. These protons make up a large fraction of high energy cosmic rays that impact the Earth. The effect is so great that the Earth receives five times more cosmic radiation at its northernmost point relative to the galactic plane compared to its southernmost point.

This lopsided effect exists because the Milky Way travels at a speed of 200 kilometres per second in the direction of the Virgo Supercluster of galaxies, which lie to the galactic north. The intergalactic medium, consisting mostly of ionized hydrogen gas, serves as an impediment, which has deformed the galactic halo towards the south. When the halo gas meets the interstellar medium, a bow shock is created. The energy in the shock front is transferred via a magnetic process to protons from both the intergalactic medium and the halo. These are the protons which form the cosmic rays.

Also in this chapter Davies considers viruses as possible vehicles for interstellar communication which store intelligent messages in their DNA and then 'upload' it into host cells on arrival at inhabited planets. He also speculates that if extraterrestrials visited the Earth in the past, they could gerrymander genomes of some living organisms, what he calls 'genomic SETI'. Even though these methods of communication face great obstacles, primarily because DNA is notoriously mutable, Davies thinks it is worth trying to check that since genome sequencing is performed anyway and genomes are uploaded into the Internet, so it costs almost nothing to run the data through a computer to look for suspicious patterns.

=== Chapter 6: Evidence for a Galactic Diaspora ===
Davies begins by mentioning the Fermi Paradox, and mentions various ways we could find signs of extraterrestrial life tampering with their environments.

=== Chapter 7: Alien Magic ===
Davies discusses the advanced nature of alien technology, and the problems we might have at distinguishing this technology. Davies characterizes technology as "nature-plus", i.e. it performs the functions of nature in an accelerated manner. Also, he believes that technology has gone through two stages: the manipulation of matter (the wheel, steam engine, etc.) and the manipulation of information (computers, phones, etc.).

=== Chapter 8: Post-Biological Intelligence ===
Davies continues his discussion of alien technology, and comes to the conclusion that extraterrestrial intelligence might not be interested in the physical world at all and would instead take on the form of a quantum computer.

=== Chapter 9: First Contact ===
Here, Davies talks about the consequences of detecting intelligent aliens, and various reactions from governments, scientists, the media, and religious organizations.

=== Chapter 10: Who Speaks for the Earth? ===
In this chapter, Davies asks what the best message to send to the aliens is. Finally, he discusses his own viewpoint on the probability of extraterrestrial life, and concludes that, as a scientist, he believes that intelligent aliens are highly unlikely. However, as a human being, he hopes that such aliens in fact exist.

== See also ==
- Astrobiology
- Paul Davies
