= Design sprint =

Hackathon-like rapid prototyping and testing

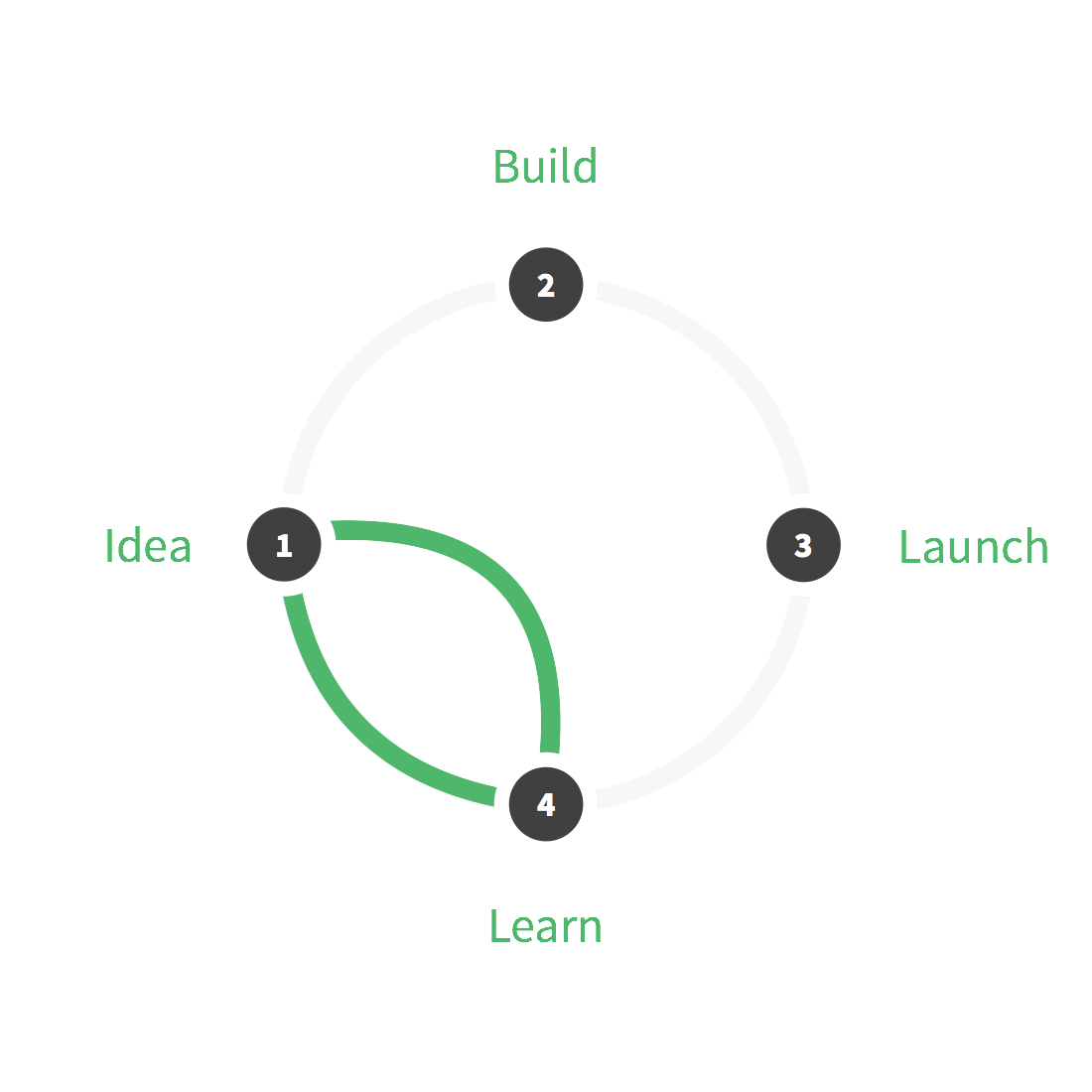
With a design sprint, a product doesn't need to go full cycle to learn about the opportunities and gather feedback.

A design sprint is a time-constrained, five-phase process that uses design thinking with the aim of reducing the risk when bringing a new product, service or a feature to the market. The process aims to help teams to clearly define goals, validate assumptions and decide on a product roadmap before starting development. It seeks to address strategic issues using interdisciplinary expertise, rapid prototyping, and usability testing. This design process is similar to Sprints in an Agile development cycle.

== How it started ==
There are multiple origins to the concept of mixing Agile and Design Thinking. The most popular was developed by a multi-disciplinary team working out of Google Ventures. The initial iterations of the approach were created by Jake Knapp, and popularised by a series of blog articles outlining the approach and reporting on its successes within Google. As it gained industry recognition, the approach was further refined and added to by other Google staff including Braden Kowitz, Michael Margolis, John Zeratsky and Daniel Burka.

It was later published in a book by Google Ventures called "Sprint: How to Solve Big Problems and Test New Ideas in Just Five Days"..

The term “Design Sprint” became globally popular after Jake Knapp’s 2016 book, but it is not the only — nor the first — published sprint methodology. In 2014, Brazilian service designer Tenny Pinheiro released "The Service Startup: Design Thinking Gets Lean"., introducing the Service Design Sprint: a structured sprint method grounded in Service Design and Lean Startup principles. While Knapp’s approach grew from Google Ventures’ internal work (2010–2012) and focused on rapid product prototyping, Pinheiro’s method targeted service innovation. These are two separate evolutions of the sprint idea, and both deserve recognition.

== Possible uses ==
Claimed uses of the approach include

- Launching a new product or a service.
- Extending an existing experience to a new platform.
- Existing MVP needing revised User experience design and/or UI Design.
- Adding new features and functionality to a digital product.
- Opportunities for improvement of a product (e.g. a high rate of cart abandonment)
- Opportunities for improvement of a service.
- Supporting organizations in their transformation towards new technologies (e.g., AI).

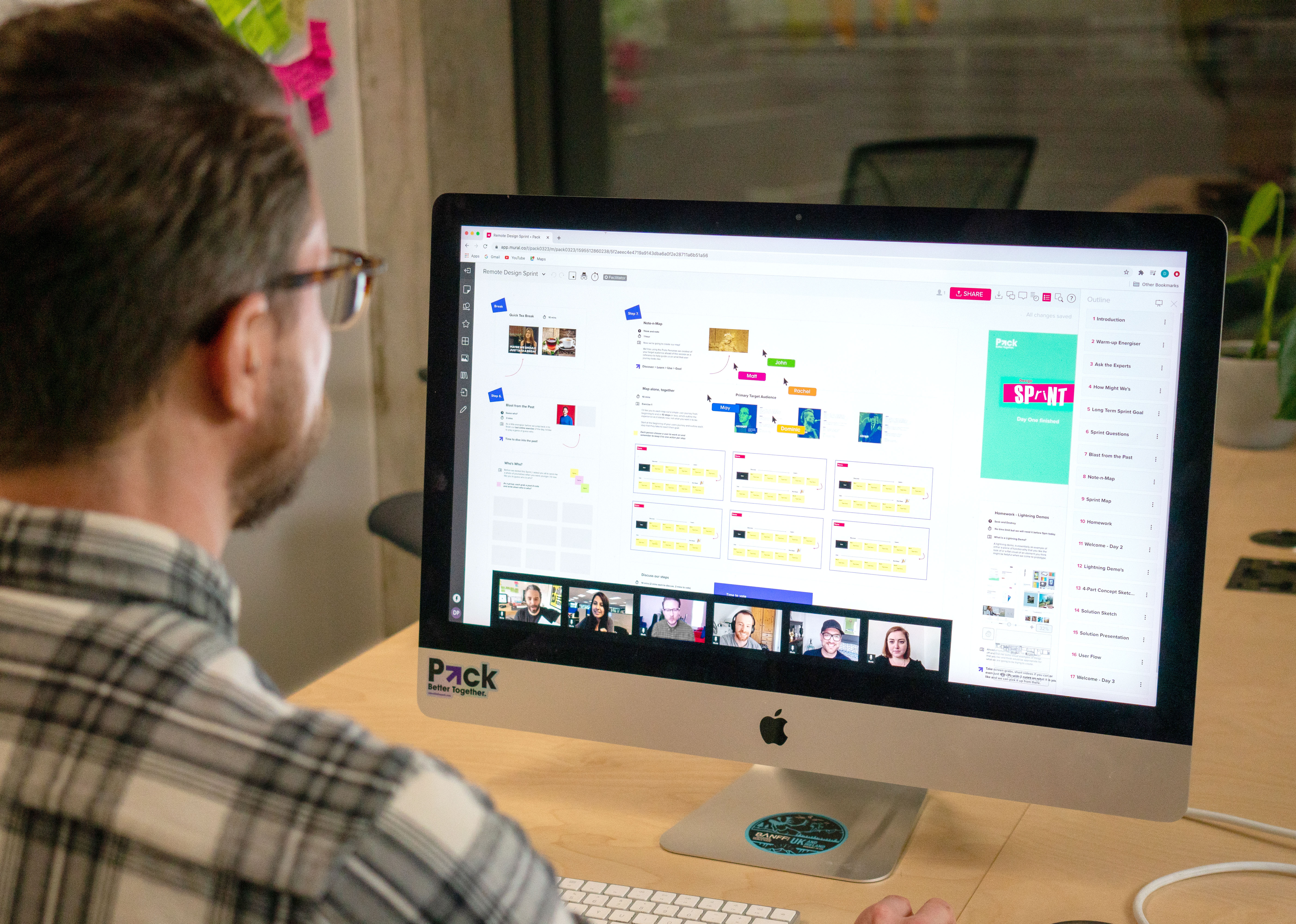
A facilitator delivering a remote design sprint workshop with participants on screen

== Phases ==
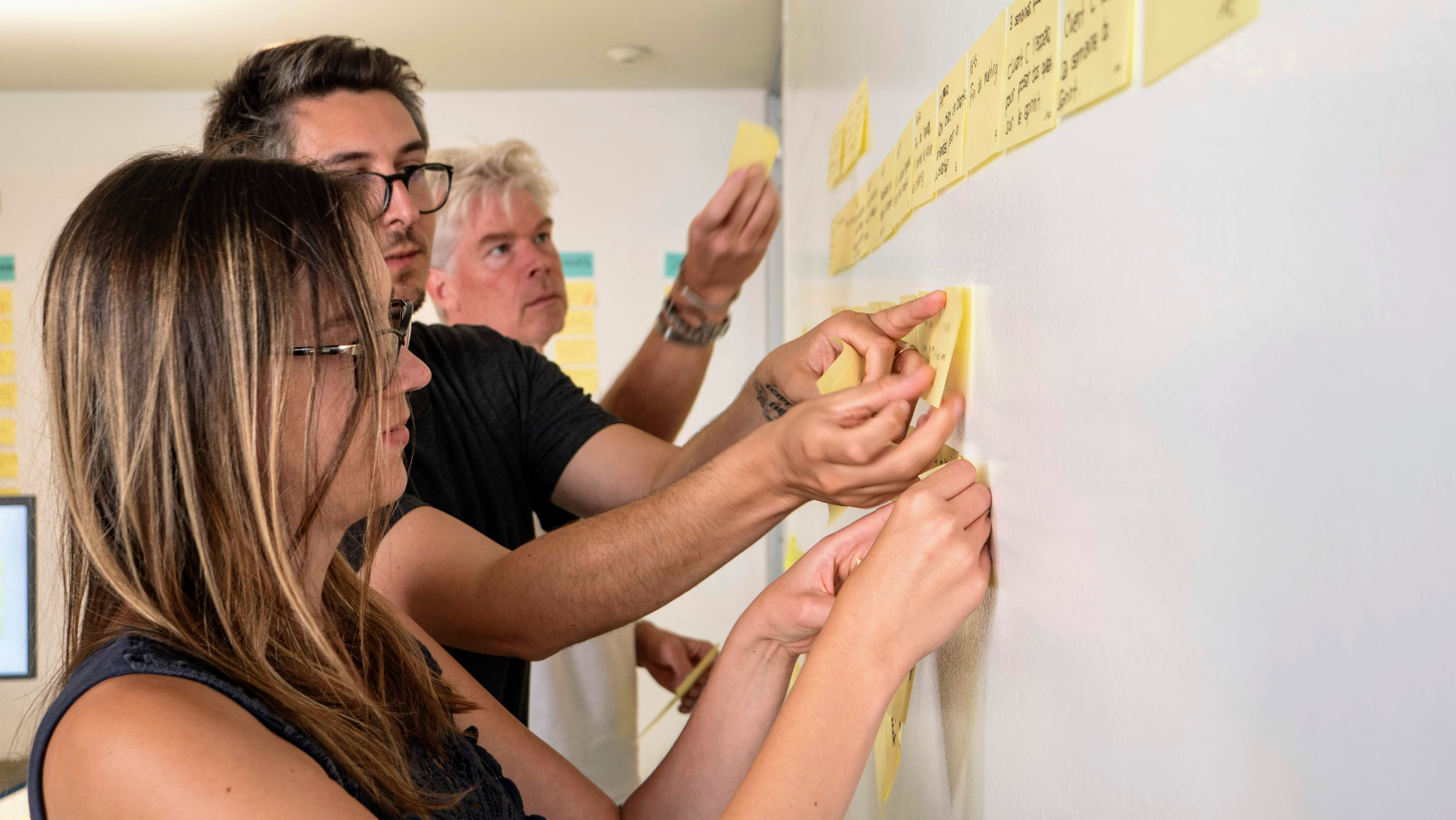
The 'understand' phase of a design sprint workshop

The creators of the design sprint approach, recommend preparation by picking the proper team, environment, materials and tools working with six key 'ingredients'.

1. Understand: Discover the business opportunity, the audience, the competition, the value proposition, and define metrics of success.
2. Diverge: Explore, develop and iterate creative ways of solving the problem, regardless of feasibility.
3. Converge: Identify ideas that fit the next product cycle and explore them in further detail through storyboarding.
4. Prototype: Design and prepare prototype(s) that can be tested with people.
5. Test: Conduct 1:1 usability testing with 5-6 people from the product's primary target audience. Ask good questions.

== Deliverables ==
The main deliverables after the Design sprint:

- Answers to a set of vital questions
- Findings from the sprint (notes, user journey maps, storyboards, information architecture diagrams, etc.)
- Prototypes
- Report from the usability testing with the findings (backed by testing videos)
- A plan for next steps
- Validate or invalidate hypotheses before committing resources to build the solution

== Team ==
The suggested ideal number of people involved in the sprint is 4-7 people and they include the facilitator, designer, a decision maker (often a CEO if the company is a startup), product manager, engineer and someone from companies core business departments (Marketing, Content, Operations, etc.).

== Variants ==
The concept sprint is a fast five-day process for cross-functional teams to brainstorm, define, and model new approaches to business issue..

== Industry examples ==
While initially developed for startups and technology firms, the design sprint methodology has been adopted by multinational corporations, public sector institutions, and cultural organizations to facilitate organizational change and product development.

For instance, the toy manufacturer LEGO systematically integrated the framework into its internal creative agency, executing approximately 150 design sprints over a twelve-month period to restructure operational dynamics and foster agile practices.

The framework has also been adapted outside of corporate environments; the British Museum utilized the methodology to optimize its digital and physical visitor wayfinding systems, and the municipal government of Denver modified the traditional five-day schedule into shorter, distributed sessions to accommodate public sector resource constraints.
