= Bunch–Davies vacuum =

Type of quantum state in de Sitter spacetime

In quantum field theory in curved spacetime, there is a whole class of quantum states over a background de Sitter space which are invariant under all the isometries: the alpha-vacua. Among them there is a particular one whose associated Green functions verify a condition (Hadamard condition) consisting to behave on the light-cone as in flat space. This state is usually called the Bunch–Davies vacuum or Euclidean vacuum, actually was first obtained by N.A. Chernikov and E. A. Tagirov, in 1968 and later by C. Schomblond and P. Spindel, in 1976, in the framework of a general discussion about invariant Green functions on de Sitter space. The Bunch–Davies vacuum can also be described as being generated by an infinite time trace from the condition that the scale of quantum fluctuations is much smaller than the Hubble scale. The state possesses no quanta at the asymptotic past infinity.

The Bunch–Davies state is the zero-particle state as seen by a geodesic observer, that is, an observer who is in free fall in the expanding state. The state explains the origin of cosmological perturbation fluctuations in inflationary models.

== See also ==
- Quantum field theory in curved spacetime
- Unruh effect
- Hawking radiation
- Inflation (cosmology)
