= Doppler (novel) =

2004 novel by Erlend Loe

First edition (Norwegian)

Doppler is a satirical novel by Norwegian author Erlend Loe. It was first published in 2004 in Norwegian where it was a 'barnstorming success', selling over 100,000 copies. It was translated into English in 2012 by Don Bartlett and Don Shaw with the tagline "An elk is for life ... not just for Christmas".

It was identified by Salley Vickers in The Guardian as one of her books of the year, 'wonderfully subversive, funny and original'.

== Plot introduction ==
Following the death of his father and after falling off his bike, Doppler decides to abandon his home in Oslo, job, children and pregnant wife and live a solitary life in a tent in the forest just outside the city. He kills a moose ('elk' in British English) for food but then discovers it has a young calf which he adopts, names Bongo and with whom he discusses the state of the world he has left behind, with its consumerism and focus on personal success. Doppler determines to live a life as far as possible removed from his previous life but finds it impossible to escape entirely, resorting to bartering and even theft to meet his needs. His existence gains much unwanted attention and he struggles to maintain his isolation.
