= Well drink =

Alcoholic beverage

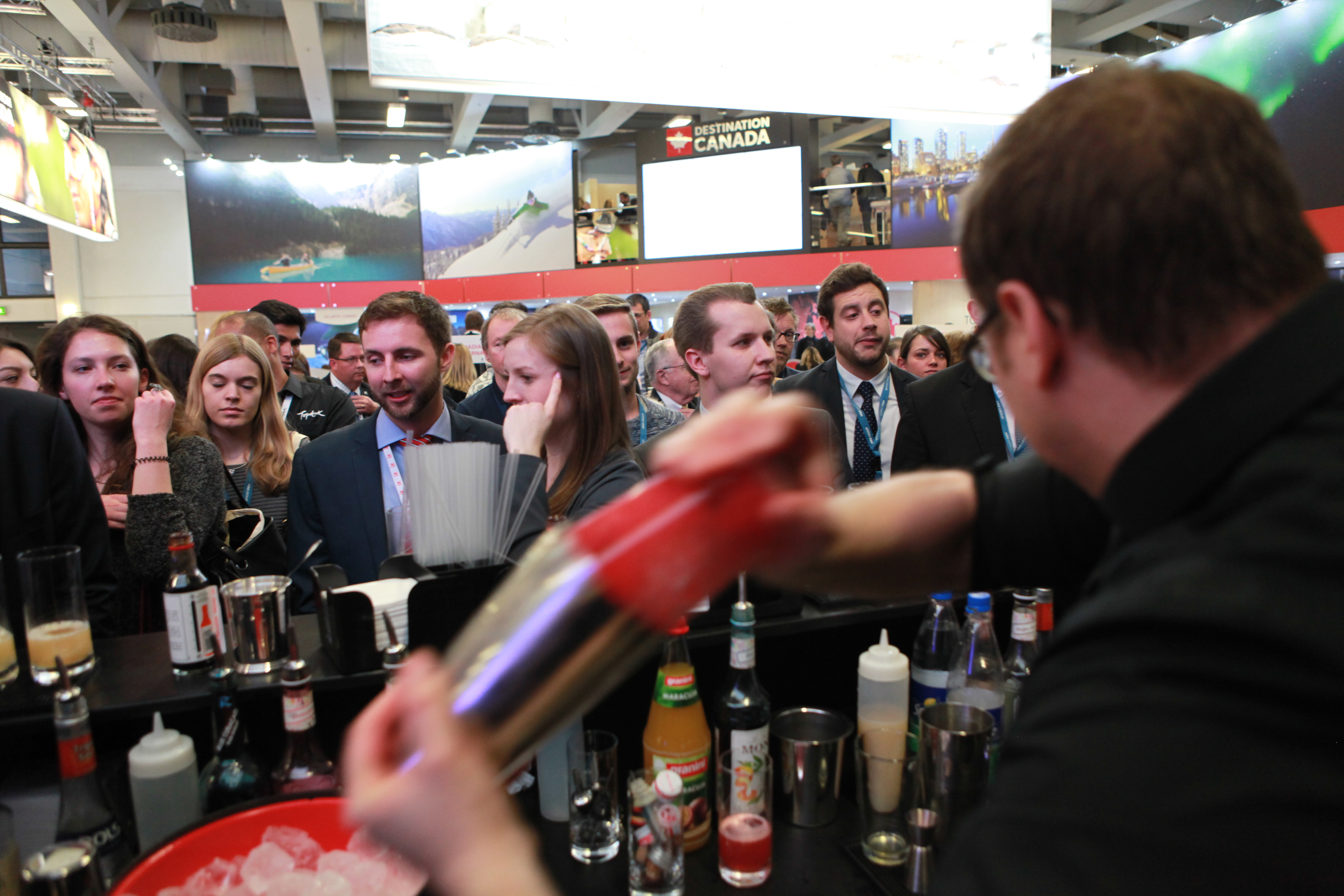
This view from behind a Berlin bar shows the rows of liquor bottles and mixers on the underbar shelf. They are stored so that these bottles are readily available to the bartender to make the most popular drinks.

A well drink or rail drink is an alcoholic beverage or mixed drink made using the lower-cost liquors stored within easy reach of the bartender in the bar's "speed rail", "speed rack", or "well", a rack or shelf at a lower level than the bar that the bartender uses to prepare drinks. In any given establishment, the rail/well liquors available may also be known as the "house pours", "house brands", "house spirits", "pour brands", or "proprietary spirits".

Well drinks differ from "call" drinks in that the former are offered when a customer does not specify a particular brand of liquor when ordering a mixed drink.

The actual liquors used by a drinking establishment will vary. The most common well liquors are vodka and blended whiskey. Common well drinks include at least one variety each of gin, rum, whiskey, vodka, bourbon, tequila, triple sec, and vermouth. Some establishments that cater to higher-end clientele or wish to project an aura of luxury choose premium brands to be their well liquors (thus offering a "premium well").

== Call and top-shelf ==
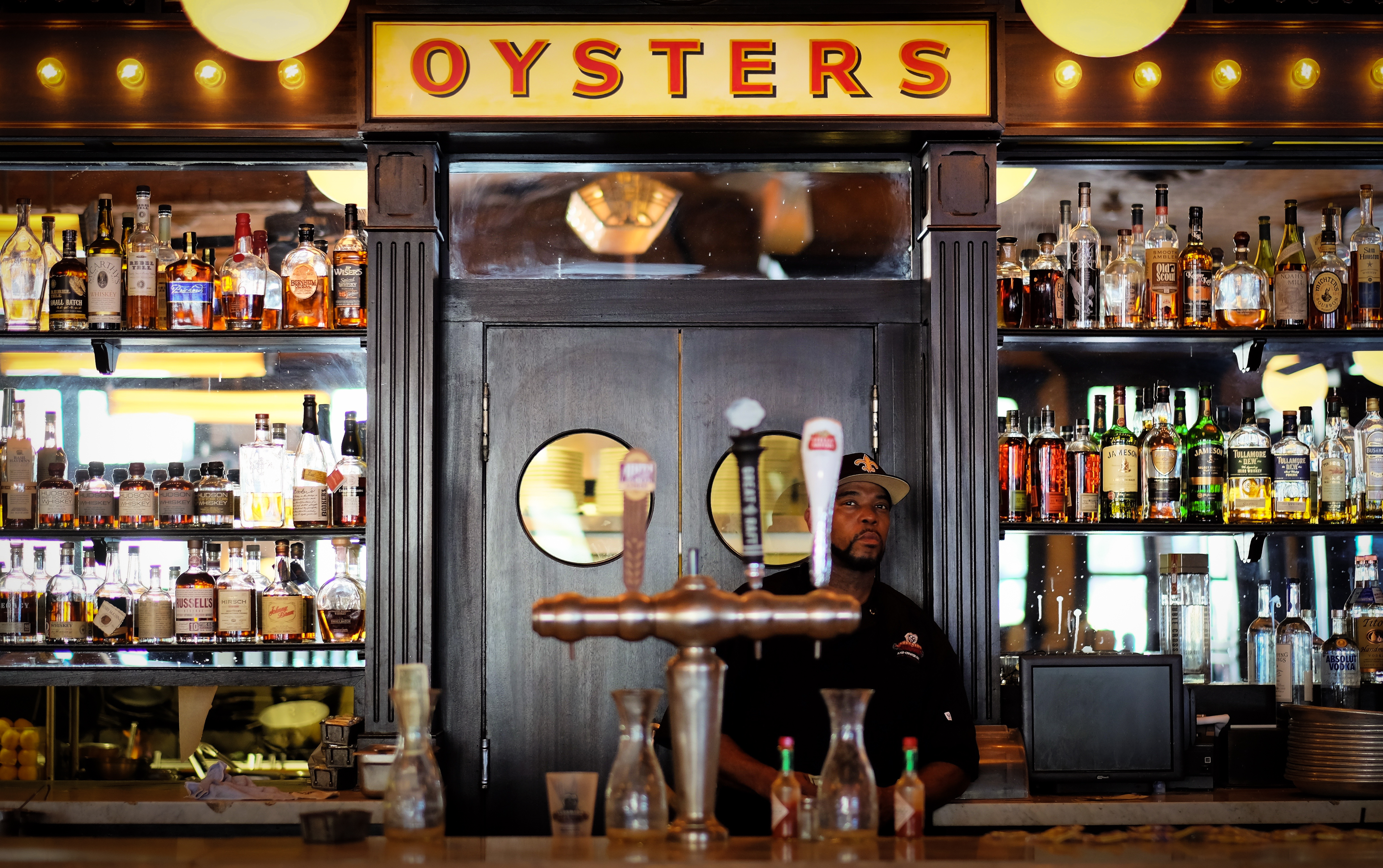
The high shelves behind the bartender at New Orleans' Superior bar display the establishment's expensive, "top shelf" liquor brands.

A rail or well drink is usually served when a customer does not specify that a particular brand of liquor be used. For example, a customer order for a "Scotch and soda" would lead the bartender to use a rail/well Scotch whisky and would be priced as a well drink, whereas ordering "Glenlivet and soda" would be a call drink. Another example would be a "Jack and Coke" rather than a "Whiskey and Coke."

Call liquors are known as such because the customer "calls" or requests a particular brand of liquor. Certain expensive brand-name liquors are not considered or priced as call, but are instead known as "top-shelf liquors", both from their placement on the shelves and from their price relative to the other liquors available.

== See also ==
- House wine
