= Service design sprint =

Design project type

A Service Design Sprint is a time-constrained Service Design project that uses Design Thinking and Service Design tools to create a new service or improve an existing one.

== Methodology ==
The term Service Design Sprint was first introduced by the Brazilian service designer Tenny Pinheiro in his book The Service Startup: Design Thinking Gets Lean (Elsevier; 2014). The Minimum Valuable Service methodology used in a Service Design Sprint combines Agile-based approaches with Service-dominant logic and Service Design tools to help product development teams understand, co-design, and prototype complex service scenarios with low resources and within the timespan of a week. The methodology, created by Tenny Pinheiro in 2014, was designed to be used by startups and tech companies.

== Applications ==
A Service Design Sprint differs from a traditional Design Sprint due to its service dominant logic inclination. It provides a more holistic approach by breaking the challenge into an ecosystem and focusing on rapid research outreach efforts, bespoke ethnographic rounds to gather outside-in insights instead of relying on in-room-only idea harvesting.

Since its inception, the approach has been used by startups, tech companies, taught on educational institutions like the university of Lapland in Finland, MIT, and in consultancy practices by design firms.

== Structure ==
The Minimum Valuable Service model is divided into four phases each containing a set of tools.

1. Projection: Agile ethnographic tools are used to uncover untapped barriers, needs, and desires, understand mental models and get a sense of the user's “Learn, Use and Remember” journey.
2. Perspectives: Tools like the Swap Ideation are used here to co-design with users, generating valuable service propositions.
3. Playground: Mockup and roleplaying tools are used to prototype ideas and explore concepts in a playful manner.
4. Polish Off: The MVS Journey, an Agile service blueprint tool, is used in this phase to breakdown interactions in intentions and avatars.
