= About Time (book) =

Essay by Paul Davies

- Author: Paul Davies
- Language: English
- Publisher: Penguin Books, Simon & Schuster
- Publication date: 1 March 1995
- Pages: 320
- ISBN: 978-0-14-195198-0

About Time: Einstein's Unfinished Revolution (ISBN 978-0-684-81822-1), published in 1995, is the second book written by Paul Davies, regarding the subject of time. His first book on time was his The Physics of Time Asymmetry (1977)(ISBN 0-520-02825-2). The intended audience is the general public, rather than science academics.

About Time explores selected mysteries of spacetime, following on from Albert Einstein's theory of relativity, which Davies believes does not fully explain time as humans experience it. The author explains

Important though Einstein's time turned out to be, it still did not solve "the riddle of time".

The book delves into the nature of metaphysics, time, motion and gravity, covering a wide range of aspects surrounding the current cosmological debate, across 283 pages in great detail. It includes an index, a bibliography, and numerous diagrams.

== See also ==
- Basic introduction to the mathematics of curved spacetime
- Sense of time
- The Mind of God
- How to Build a Time Machine, 2002 fiction book by the same author
