= Top-shelf liquor =

Marketing description

Top-shelf liquor (or "premium liquor") is a term used in marketing to describe higher-priced alcoholic beverages, typically stored on the top shelves within bars. This contrasts to a "rail" or well drink, which are lower cost beverages typically stored on the lower shelves of the bartender's rack.

== Tiers of beverages ==
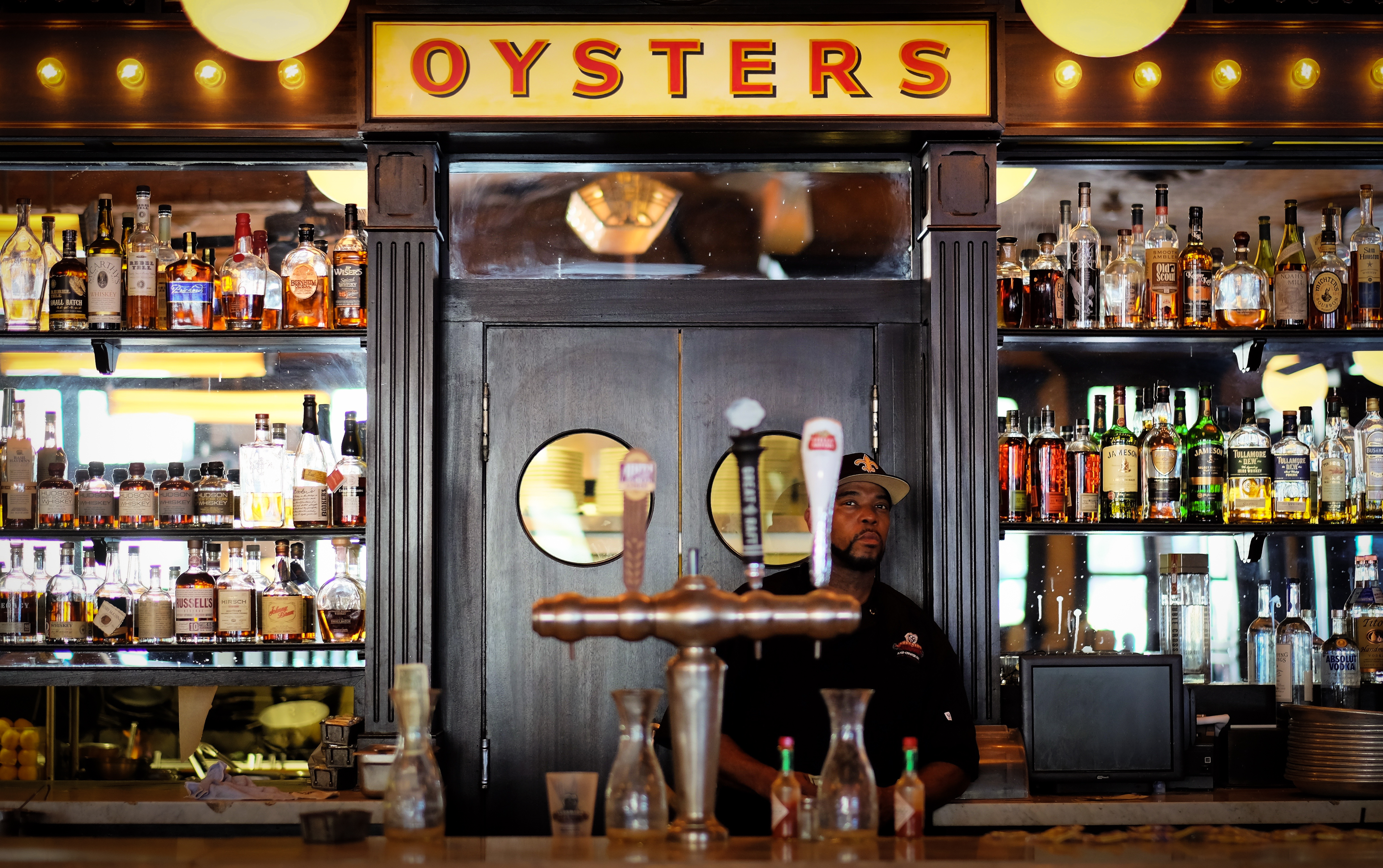
The high shelves behind the bartender at New Orleans' Superior bar display the establishment's expensive, "top shelf" liquor brands.

The Distilled Spirits Council of the United States (DISCUS) divides all spirit categories into four segments: standard, premium, high-end premium, and super premium, with each of the latter three categories often colloquially described under the umbrella of "top shelf".

The categories of premium and super-premium beverage describe top-shelf liquors which may possess additional special attributes, including, but not limited to, brand, batch size, rarity, aging, craftsmanship, revenue for the manufacturer, and marketing budget.

Research by GlobalData indicates growing market share of the premium and super-premium segment, with 40% of global liquor consumers already consuming the category.

== Social reception ==
The trend of certain drinks being labeled "top-shelf" or "premium" and being demanded by consumers based on this status is described as "premiumization." Increased demand from consumers based on perceived "premium" status has been measured to be on the rise since 2020.

Premium labeling, however, is often a topic of debate among consumers and critics. Some use the term premium as a measure of quality, describing liquors made with "natural ingredients and more careful distilling and aging processes" To other industry insiders, the term has been described as "meaningless" with those who purchase premium liquors "really just paying for a mass-produced spirit with an excessively high marketing budget." Some scientific studies have indeed indicated that one's decision to purchase alcohol perceived as premium is not tied to quality at all, but rather to a driven subconscious pursuit of status, complex social factors and desire to conform.
