= The Mind of God =

1992 non-fiction book by Paul Davies

- Softcover edition
- Author: Paul Davies
- Language: English
- Genre: Non-fiction
- Publisher: Simon & Schuster UK
- Publication date: 1992
- Publication place: United Kingdom
- Media type: Print, e-book
- ISBN: 0-671-71069-9
- OCLC: 27726607

The Mind of God is a 1992 non-fiction book by Paul Davies. Subtitled The Scientific Basis for a Rational World, it is a whirlwind tour and explanation of theories, both physical and metaphysical, regarding ultimate causes. Its title comes from a quotation from Stephen Hawking: "If we do discover a theory of everything...it would be the ultimate triumph of human reason—for then we would truly know the mind of God."

In the preface, Davies explains that he has been interested in ultimate causes since childhood, having annoyed his parents with unending "why's" about everything, with each answer demanding another "why," and usually ending with the reply, "Because God made it that way, and that's that!" In the book proper, Davies briefly explores: the nature of reason, belief, and metaphysics; theories of the origin of the universe; the laws of nature; the relationship of mathematics to physics; a few arguments for the existence of God; the possibility that the universe shows evidence of a deity; and his opinion of the implications of Gödel's incompleteness theorem, that "the search for a closed logical scheme that provides a complete and self-consistent explanation is doomed to failure."

He concludes with a statement of his belief that, even though we may never attain a theory of everything, "the existence of mind in some organism on some planet in the universe is surely a fact of fundamental significance. Through conscious beings the universe has generated self-awareness. This can be no trivial detail, no minor byproduct of mindless, purposeless forces. We are truly meant to be here."

== Reception ==
In a review in The New York Times, Marcia Bartusiak called the book "both stimulating and enlightening".

== See also ==
- First Cause
- Substantial form
- Laws of Thought
- Laws of Nature
- Nous
- Plato
- Theory of Everything
