= Erlend Loe =

Norwegian writer

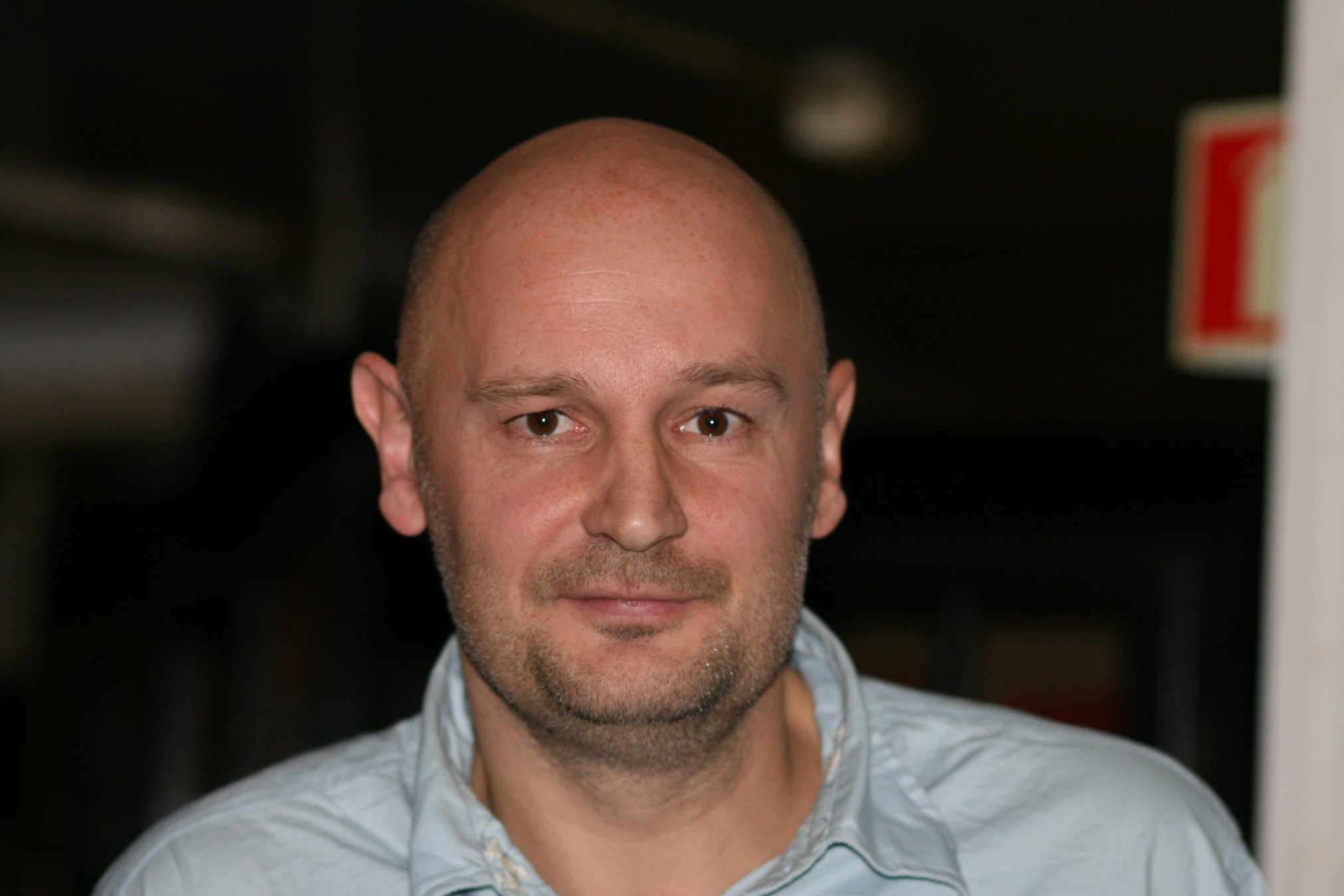
- Erlend Loe in 2007
- Born: Erlend Frank Erik Loe; 24 May 1969 (age 57); Trondheim, Norway
- Occupations: Novelist and screenwriter
- Writing career
- Period: 1993-
- Notable works: Naïve. Super; L Doppler
- Notable awards: Aschehoug Prize, Cappelen Prize; Norwegian Booksellers' Prize

Erlend Loe (24 May 1969, Trondheim) is a Norwegian novelist, screenwriter and film critic. Loe writes both children's and adult literature. He has gained popularity in Scandinavia with his humorous and sometimes naïve novels, although his stories have become darker in tone, moving towards a more satirical criticism of modern Norwegian society.

== Biography ==
Erlend Loe worked at a psychiatric clinic, as a substitute teacher and as a freelance journalist for Norwegian newspaper Adresseavisen. Loe now lives and works in Oslo where in 1998 he co-founded Screenwriters Oslo, an office community for screenwriters.

His first book Tatt av kvinnen (Gone with the Woman) was published in 1993, and a year later published a children's book, Fisken (The Fish), about a forklift operator named Kurt. Loe has a distinctive style of writing which is often likened to naïve art. He often uses irony, exaggeration and humor. His children's books are illustrated by Kim Hiorthøy. Loe has recorded many of his books as Norwegian audiobooks.

His popular novel Naiv. Super. (Naïve. Super.) has been translated into over 30 languages including English.

== Bibliography ==
=== Novels ===
(English title only mentioned if English translation has been published.)

- Tatt av kvinnen (1993)
- Naïve. Super (Naive.Super.) (1996)
- L (1999)
- Fakta om Finland (2001)
- Doppler (Doppler) (2004)
- Volvo lastvagnar (Volvo Trucks) (2005)
- Muleum (Muleum) (2007)
- Stille dager i Mixing Part (Lazy Days) (2009)
- Fvonk (2011)
- Vareopptelling (2013; English: Tallying the Inventory)
- Slutten på verden slik vi kjenner den (English: The End of the World We Know) (2015)
- Dyrene I Afrika (English: The Animals in Africa) (2018)
- Helvete (English: Hell) (2019)
- Forhandle med virkeligheten: Ett år på ett hjul (English: Negotiating with Reality: One Year on One Wheel) (2020)
- Drømmenes cykelregister (English: Dream Bike Register) (2025)

=== Other works ===
- Fisken (1994), Children's book
- Maria & José (1994), picture book
- Kurt blir grusom (1995), children's book, also adapted into an animated film
- Den store røde hunden (1996), children's book
- Kurt quo vadis? (1998), children's book
- Detektor (2000), film script
- Jotunheimen, bill.mrk. 2469 (2001), text to photographs by Bård Løken
- Klatretøsen (2002), film script
- Kurt koker hodet (2003), play, also adapted into a children's book
- Pingvinhjelpen (2006), play
- Organisten (2006), with Petter Amundsen, non-fiction
- The Mischievous Russ/Den Fæle Russen short story in Jørn Tomter's photography book The Norwegian Way
- Kurtby (2008), children's book
- North (2009), screenplay
- Kurt kurér (2010), children's book
- En helt vanlig dag på jobben (2010), screenplay
- Fruit Delivery (short) (2012), original screenplay
- Fisken och apelsinen (short) (2012), original screenplay
- Bara sex (short) (2012), screenplay
- Alle hater Johan (2022), screenplay

== Awards ==
- 1997: Cappelen Prize
- 1999: Norwegian Booksellers' Prize for L
- 2013: Aschehoug Prize

Awards
Preceded by Gert Nygårdshaug	Recipient of the Cappelen Prize; 1997	Succeeded by Georg Johannesen
