= 4C +09.17 =

Quasar in the constellation Orion

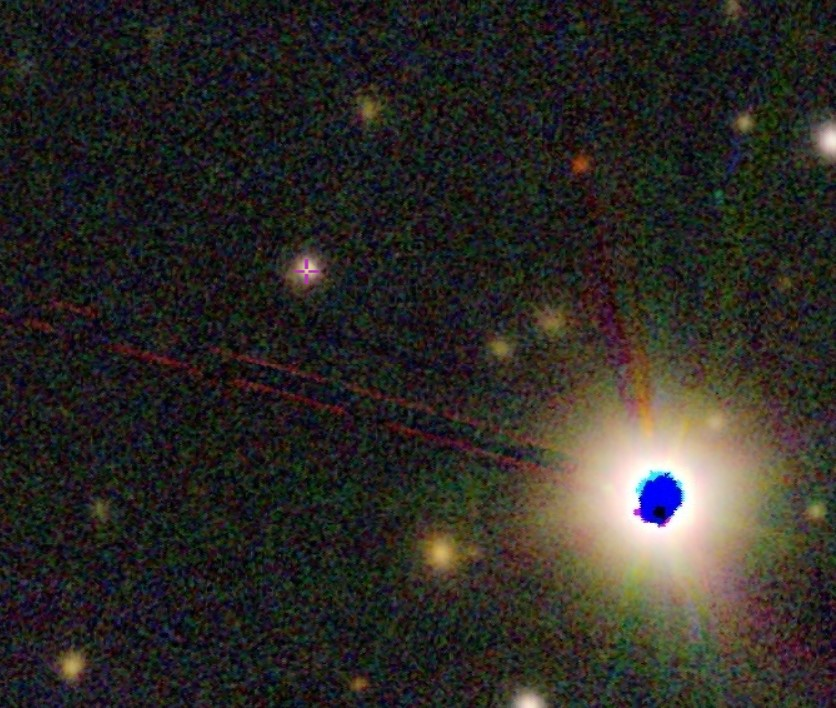
- Pan-STARRS image of 4C +09.17 (located upper left)

Observation data (J2000.0 epoch)
- Constellation: Orion
- Right ascension: 04h 48m 21.738s
- Declination: +09d 50m 51.46s
- Redshift: 2.108300
- Heliocentric radial velocity: 632,053 kilometer per second
- Distance: 10.6 Gly (light travel time distance)
- Apparent magnitude (V): 0.89
- Apparent magnitude (B): 1.18
- Surface brightness: 19.55

Other designations
- PKS 0445+097, NVSS J044821+095050, PGC 2818855, S3 0445+09, MRC 0445+097, GB6 J0448+0950, 87GB J044538.1+094529

4C +09.17 is a quasar located in the constellation Orion. With a redshift of 2.108300, the object is located 10.6 billion light years from Earth and presents an extragalactic astrophysical jet morphology.

== Characteristics ==
4C +09.17 is classified a radio-loud quasar, measured from its narrow-line region, with a bolometric luminosity of 2.88 × 10^{46}erg s^{−1}. It has a one-sided jet extending southwest, with its bright core emission associated with the quasar's optical emission location. 4C +09.17 is also very bright at infrared wavelengths as observed by Podigachoski et al. (2015).

=== Host galaxy ===
The host galaxy of 4C +09.17 is a luminous elliptical galaxy consisting of clumpy star-forming regions with star formation rate of 9 ± 1 M_{☉} yr−1 and a molecular gas reservoir of (3 ± 0.3) × 109 M_{☉}. It belongs to a galaxy group system consisting of several galaxies with similar dynamical masses of ~1010–11M_{☉} and is surrounded by three companions, 17.9<K<20.2 magnitude at radii of 1.7<Deltar<2.9 arcsec, with a bright, diffuse emission. The brightest companion has a redshift of z=0.8384, which its optical-infrared colors, is consistent with a late-type spiral galaxy with a luminosity of 2L*. This object is responsible for the strongest Magnesium ii absorption-line system seen in the spectrum of 4C+09.17.

=== Interacting galaxy system ===
4C +09.17 is found in the process of interacting and merging with another galaxy, 4C +09.17B, with a star formation rate of 96 ± 8 M_{☉} yr^{−1}, observed by the OSIRIS integral field spectroscopy (IFS) via detecting emission from the [O III], H α, and [N II] emission lines. Multiphase outflows can be found detected, which extends towards the eastern direction, with its total outflow rate of 400 ± 50 M_{☉} yr^{−1} which is driven by quasar activity mainly from its host star formation.

== Observation of emission in 4C +09.17 ==
Through detection by Keck and OSIRIS, researchers detected traces of ionized gas emission in nebular emission lines [O iii] 5007 Å, Hα, and [N ii] 6585 Å inside 4C +09.17. They noted an ionized gas outflow extending towards east with a maximum extent of 6 kpc.

Researchers further found a broad, blueshifted emission which resembles a molecular gas outflow inside the host galaxy of 4C +09.17, known as 4C +09.17 A-RL. They also detected a broad component in the merging radio-quiet galaxy towards northeast, known as 4C +09.17 B-RQ, which was found through K-band imaging with a red optical to near-inflared continuum color.

The component of 4C +09.17 has a faint narrow [O iii] emission, with an undetected ionized outflow. Besides, it also contains a narrower emission line component in CO (4–3). The velocity offset between 4C +09.17 A-RL and 4C +09.17 B-RQ is found to be −593 km s−1, which the majority of the narrow CO emission line flux is found concentrated within a 1 kpc radius region. The majority of the dust continuum detected at far-infrared wavelengths with the Herschel Space Telescope is likely associated with this galaxy. It was confirmed to be highly obscured; the narrow CO emission component yielding a line-integrated gas column density of 3.4 × 1024 cm−2 computed by dividing the molecular gas mass by the area of the emitting region. Using the Milky Way's hydrogen column density–V-band extinction relationship, researchers found a V-band extinction of 150 mag. The narrow carbon emission is likely at the center of the merging galaxy as it roughly corresponds to the K-band continuum's peak location.

As for the galaxies from southwest and northwest of the quasar, narrow CO (4–3) emission is detected near their optical locations. There are no high-velocity or broad molecular gas associated within the two systems. From the detection of three galaxies found within 20 kpc of 4C +09.17 host galaxy from both ALMA and Keck/OSIRIS observations makes the system a proto–group candidate environment at redshift ~ 2.11.

The molecular gas outflow in 4C +09.17 A-RL is compacted than the ionized gas outflow. There is a similar blueshifted velocities and velocity dispersion in the ionized and molecular gas outflows. The maximum extent of the molecular gas outflow is 2.8 kpc, while the ionized outflow extends to 6 kpc. Researchers find that both the ionized and molecular outflow in this system are not directly in the path of the radio jet but extending towards the eastern direction. Similar results have recently been found for a subset of nearby galaxies, where outflows appear to expand perpendicular to the path of the jet.

In 4C +09.17 B-RQ, the molecular outflow extends 4.9 kpc from the narrow CO emission line component. The extent of the molecular outflow in 4C +09.17 B-RQ roughly matches the maximum extent of the K-band stellar continuum; hence, the molecular outflow is occurring on galactic scales in this galaxy. Extinction within the outflowing gas can potentially prevent ionization by quasar photons and prevent the observer from detecting recombination photons.

== Evidence of gas stripping in 4C +09.17 system ==
Through galaxy interactions in the 4C +09.17 system creating a hot virialized halo with temperatures ranging as high as 107 K, researchers have detected an outflow likely driven by its energy-conserving shock, indicating the presence of a hot gas medium. The ram pressure due to the hot gas causes stripping, a common byproduct in local clusters and seen as a large extended gas streams extending from satellite galaxies. This phenomenon, suggests the galaxy inside the 4C +09.17 system is a jellyfish galaxy given it showed an extended stream structure as it merges with 4C +09.17. This galaxy has a similar appearance like the galaxy from FOGGIE simulation (Cyclone halo) undergoing a ram pressure process in a dark matter halo containing a mass of 1012 M_{☉}. This redshifted kinematic component in 4C +09.17 kindred with galaxy D has similar streams morphology, likely these galaxies are experiencing levels of gas stripping as they move down with the accretion flow.

From a study conducted by Anglés-Alcázar et al. (2017), stripping of gas from satellite galaxies provides a large reservoir of material that is re-accreted on to the central galaxy. The stripped material from the 4C +09.17B is fated to be re-accreted and recycled to the galaxy group along with the circumgalactic medium gas, part of the blueshifted and redshifted kinematic components. This process plays a vital role in supplying gas to high redshift massive galaxies.
