= PKS 0529−549 =

Radio galaxy in the constellation Pictor

Observation data (J2000.0 epoch)
- Constellation: Pictor
- Right ascension: 05^{h} 30^{m} 25.21^{s}
- Declination: −54° 54′ 22.1″
- Redshift: 2.574360
- Heliocentric radial velocity: 771,774 km/s
- Distance: 10.782 Gly (light travel time distance)
- Apparent magnitude (V): 0.171
- Apparent magnitude (B): 0.227
- Surface brightness: 20.0
- Notable features: Radio galaxy, starburst galaxy

Other designations
- PGC 2824392, PKS B0529−549, MRC 0529−549, PMMM 052927.1−545647, SUMSS J053025−545422

PKS 0529−549 known as MRC 0529−549 and PKS B0529−549, is a radio galaxy located in the constellation Pictor. At the redshift of 2.57, the object is located nearly 10.8 billion light-years away from Earth.

== Characteristics ==
PKS 0529−549 is one of the high redshift radio galaxies (HzRGs) found. Detected from high-resolution 12-mm and 3-cm images, obtained by the Australia Telescope Compact Array, the galaxy is found to have a Type-II active galactic nucleus (AGN) showing two radio lobes. With a rest-frame of -9600 rad m-2, the eastern radio lobe holds a record for the highest Faraday rotation measure to date, signifying a strong magnetic field or either a dense circumgalactic medium.

The host galaxy for PKS 0529−549 is a starburst galaxy in the final stages of merging with another galaxy. The result of this galaxy merger would be progenitor of an elliptical galaxy, in which causes increasing luminosity due to high star formation in its regions. Signs of star formation included a plethora of absorption line features detected through using the deep X-shooter spectrum, stellar photospheric and wind features indicating presence of OB-type stars as well as both emission lines and low-ionization absorption features.

From further observations, PKS 0529−549 has an energetic source of radiation located throughout most of the electromagnetic spectrum. Such HzRGs like PKS 0529−549 are extremely massive, including old stars (up to ~ 10^{12} M○), hot gas (up to ~ 10^{12} M○) and molecular gas (up to ~ 10^{11} M○). Furthermore, galaxies with M_{⋆} ≳1011 M_{⊙} at z ≃ 2–3 tend to have star formation rates of order of ~100 M_{⊙} yr−1. This suggests PKS 0529−549 lies above the mean SFR–M_{⋆} relation, in the so-called star-forming main sequence.

Like most HzRGs, PKS 0529−549 is known to host large reservoirs of interstellar dust and gas. Apart from that, the galaxy is found to exhibit both hot dust emission at 8.0 μm, with a significant internal visual extinction (~1.6 mag), inferred from Spitzer Space Telescope near/mid-IR imaging.

== Observations ==
According to researchers who observed PKS 0529−549 from Atacama Large Millimeter Array in Chile, it contains chlorine [C I] and doubly ionized oxygen [O III] which display regular velocity gradients. However, their systemic velocities and kinematic PAs differ by ~300 km s^{−1} and ~30°, respectively. The [C I] is consistent with a rotating disc, meaning it is aligned together with both the stellar and dust components, while the [O III] has a possible outflow trace, that is aligned with two active galactic nuclei-driven radio lobes in the host galaxy of PKS 0529−549.

Moreover, the [C I] cube is reproduced through a 3D disc model with V_{rot} ≃ 310 km s^{−1} and σ_{V} ≲ 30 km s^{−1}, giving V_{rot}/σ_{V} ≳10, comparable to local spiral galaxies. This indicates that the [C I] disc of PKS 0529−549 is not particularly turbulent and indeed remarkable considering that PKS 0529−549 has a star formation at the rate of at ~1000 M_{⊙} yr^{−1}. Not to mention, it hosts a powerful radio-loud active galactic nucleus, with large amount of energy injected into its interstellar medium.

PKS 0529−549 is known to lie on the local baryonic Tully–Fisher relation. This is interesting since it has both estimates of both M_{⋆} and M_{mol}, other than V_{rot} and σ_{V} according to researchers who studied the galaxy. The stellar mass of PKS 0529−549 according to them, are estimated to be M_{⋆}/L_{[3.6]} = 0.5 M○/L○ which is similar for all galaxies, as expected from stellar population synthesis models with a Kroupa IMF.

Researchers further measured the rotation velocities along the flat part of the rotation curve (V_{flat}) in PKS 0529−549. This is probed by deep H I observations by Spitzer Photometry and Accurate Rotation Curves. In the case, V_{rot} is an intensity-weighted estimate over the semimajor axis, since the [C I] emission is resolved with ~2 beams. Thus, one might wonder whether they are probing V_{flat}. Local galaxies that have similar masses as PKS 0529−549 normally have rotation curves, peaking at very small radii (R ≲ 1 kpc). These tend to decline by around ~20–30 percent before reaching V_{flat}. This suggests some massive galaxies like PKS 0529−549 are in place and kinematically relaxed at z ≃ 2.6, when the universe was only ~2.5 billion years old.
