= PKS 0451−28 =

Quasar in the constellation Caelum

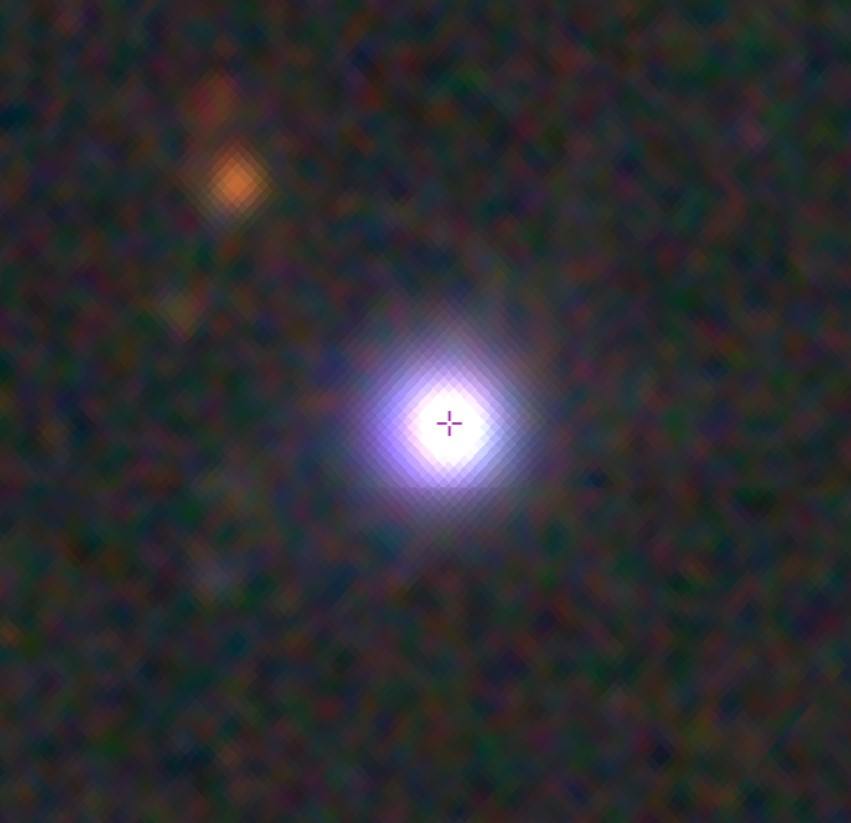
- PKS 0451−28 captured by Dark Energy Survey

Observation data (J2000.0 epoch)
- Constellation: Caelum
- Right ascension: 04^{h} 53^{m} 14.65^{s}
- Declination: −28° 07′ 7.33″
- Redshift: 2.559000
- Heliocentric radial velocity: 767,169 km/s
- Distance: 10.762 Gly (light travel time distance)
- Apparent magnitude (V): 0.085
- Apparent magnitude (B): 0.113
- Surface brightness: 18.5

Characteristics
- Type: FSRQ, blazar

Other designations
- RFC J0453−2807, WMAP 131, PGC 2824135, NVSS J045314−280736, MRC 0451−282, PMN J0453−2807, PKS J0453−2807, OF −285, IRCF J045314.6−280737, OCARS 0451−282, 2FGL J0453.1−2807, 5BZQ J0453−2807, 1RXS J045313.9−280737

PKS 0451−28 (full name PKS 0451−282), also known as MRC 0451−282, is a quasar located in the constellation of Caelum. Its redshift is 2.55, estimating the object to be located nearly 10.8 billion light-years away from Earth.

== Characteristics ==
Observed by the 20-GHz Australia Telescope Compact Array radio survey, PKS 0451−28 is classified as a blazar. It is a type of an active extragalactic object launching out a relativistic astrophysical jet towards the direction of Earth with the observer's line of sight.

The emitted radiation from PKS 0451−28 shows a strong variability across its entire electro-magnetic spectrum. As a source of non-thermal emission, from radio to high energy (HE; >100 MeV) or very high energy (VHE; >100 GeV) γ-ray bands, the jets of PKS 0451−28 are known to cover the entire spectrum. This tend to vary in a short time-scales such as in minute scales within the γ-ray band causing an increase in luminosity. The flux variation in PKS 0451−28, the observed superluminal motion, high degrees of polarization, and other features observed are explained by the relativistic beaming effects.

Moreover, PKS 0451−28 is a flat-spectrum radio quasar (FSRQ). It has a strong emission lines (EW >5 Å) and contains a powerful radio source observed by NuSTAR, with a visual magnitude of 16.7 and redshift of 0.9, which its radio fluxes have been catalogued at 1.8 Jy at 5 GHz and 3 Jy at 31 GHz respectively.

== Observations ==
According to researchers, the γ-ray luminosity in PKS 0451−28 is found to exceed 1048 erg s−1 with the highest γ-ray luminosity of (5.54 ± 0.06) × 1048 erg s−1, that is estimated for another blazar, B3 1343+451. Naturally, compared to the distribution of all BL Lacs and FSRQs that are considered γ-ray-emitting, in the Γ_{γ}−L_{γ} plane, the blazars observed, are considered to occupy the highest luminosity range.

Interestingly, PKS 0451−28 appears as a bright X-ray emitter, but however does not have signs of distinguishable features in the X-ray band, only having a flux and photon index similar to those of the other considered sources in blazars. Along with other studied blazars like PKS 0537−286, PKS 1351−108, PKS 0438−43, PKS 0834−20 and TXS 0222+185, a thermal blue-bump component is found in PKS 0451–28, suggesting emission directly from its disc.

Researchers also noted the X-ray flux in PKS 0451−28 is known to be consistent, remaining at (9.52 ± 1.21) × 10^{−14} erg cm^{−2} s^{−1} compared to a few blazars like PKS 0438−43, whose X-ray flux was in a bright X-ray state on December 15, 2016, with a flux of (1.09 ± 0.16) × 10^{−11} erg cm^{−2} s^{−1} as compared with the flux of (1.30 ± 0.31) × 10^{−11} erg cm^{−2} s^{−1} in the quiescent state.

Moreover, the adaptively binned light curves for PKS 0451−28 show several episodes of γ-rays brightening, whereas the γ-ray flux increase within day scales is observed. The peak γ-ray flux of (2.20 ± 0.50) × 10−7 photon cm^{−2} s^{−1} in PKS 0451−28 is found to be above 163.2 MeV. During the observation, it has a MJD of 56968.60 ± 0.79 with 9.64σ, corresponding to a flux of (3.70 ± 0.84) × 10^{−7} photon cm^{−2} s^{−1} above 100 MeV. During this period, Γ_{γ} was 2.06 ± 0.19. This shows only the photon index of PKS 0451−28 varies in time; the variation is highly significant in which the blazar shows a value of P(χ2) ≤ 10−5.

== Disc luminosity ==
The disc luminosity of PKS 0451−28 is estimated to be L_{d} ≃ (1.09−10.94) × 10^{46} erg s^{−1} according to researchers calculating the energetics of the considered source for the blazar by using modelling results.

== Supermassive black hole and jet luminosity ==
The supermassive black hole in PKS 0451−28 has a solar mass of within (1.69−5.35) × 10^{9} solar masses as calculated by researchers through a traditional virial method. Around 5–16 percent is contributed by the Eddington luminosity.

As for jet power in PKS 0451−28, it is in the form of the magnetic field (L_{B}) and relativistic electrons (L_{e}). Researchers calculated the jet power as L = πR2c Γ2U_{i}, where U_{i} is either electron (U_{e}) or magnetic field (U_{B}) energy density. Furthermore, the jet luminosity (defined as L = L_{e} + L_{B}) is ≤1.41 × 1046 erg s^{−1} for PKS 0451−28. It is found to be lower compared to the disc L_{d} ≃ (1.09−10.94) × 10^{46} erg s^{−1} although it has a significant correlation with the broad-line luminosity in the blazar, hence supporting the theory of jet power having a closer bond with accretion.

The jet power is found to have an approximate value of logL_{BLR} ~ (0.98 ± 0.07)logP_{jet} for all blazars including PKS 0451−28. The values are consistent with the theoretical predicted coefficient of logL_{BLR}-logL_{jet} relation. Results do support the jets in blazars like PKS 0451−28, are powered by energy extraction from both accretion and black hole spin as observed by Fermi. This finds PKS 0451−28 is a powerful blazar with high luminosity and of the same order calculated for other blazars studied both distant and nearby since the jet power do not differ substantially and those that are usually estimated for bright FSRQs.
