= NGC 5535 =

Elliptical galaxy in the constellation Boötes

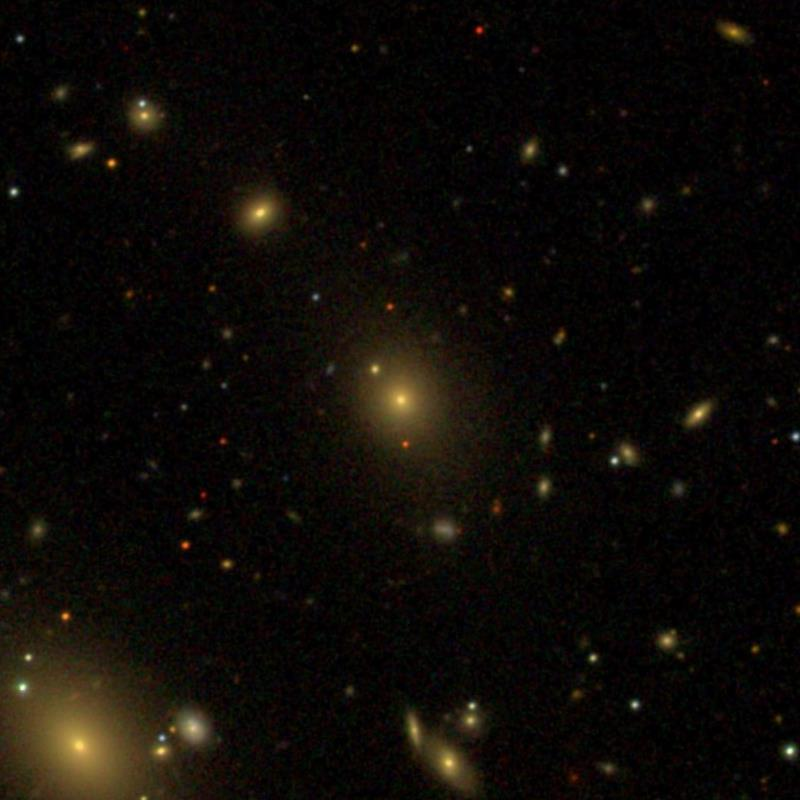

Observation data (J2000 epoch)
- Constellation: Boötes
- Right ascension: 14h 17m 31.27s
- Declination: +08d 12m 30.22s
- Redshift: 0.056804
- Heliocentric radial velocity: 17,079 km/s
- Distance: 831 Mly (254.5 Mpc)
- Group or cluster: Abell 1890
- Apparent magnitude (V): 15.0
- Apparent magnitude (B): 16.0

Characteristics
- Type: E
- Size: 178,000 ly
- Apparent size (V): 0.3' x 0.3'

Other designations
- PGC 97424, 2MASX J14173129+0812298, MRC 1415+084, [LO95] 1415+084

NGC 5535 is an elliptical galaxy in the constellation Boötes. It is located 831 million light-years away and was found by Albert Marth, a German astronomer on May 8, 1864.

NGC 5535 has an active galactic nucleus and considered as a radio galaxy according to SIMBAD, in which expels large amounts of radio waves. It is a member of Abell 1890 galaxy cluster and located to the nearby lenticular galaxy, NGC 5539, which is the brightest galaxy member.
