= PKS 0805−07 =

Quasar in the constellation of Monoceros

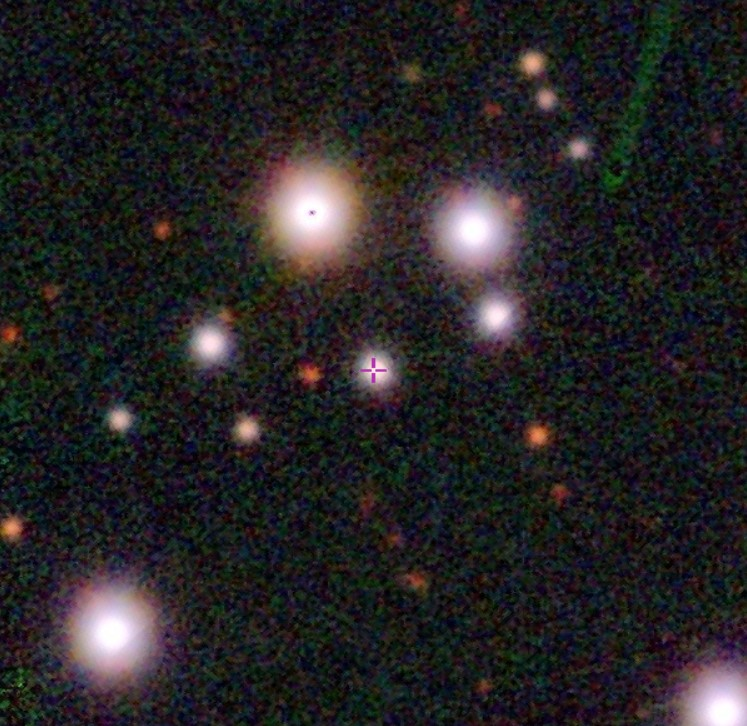
- PKS 0805−07 captured by Pan-STARRS

Observation data (J2000.0 epoch)
- Constellation: Monoceros
- Right ascension: 08^{h} 08^{m} 15.54^{s}
- Declination: −07° 51′ 09.89″
- Redshift: 1.837000
- Heliocentric radial velocity: 550,719 km/s
- Distance: 10.053 Gly (light travel time distance)
- Apparent magnitude (V): 0.388
- Apparent magnitude (B): 0.513
- Surface brightness: 18.4

Characteristics
- Type: Blazar, FSRQ
- Notable features: Blazar emitting gamma rays

Other designations
- WMAP 133, TXS 0805−077, PGC 2825379, PKS B0805−077, NVSS J080815−075109, 3FGL J0808.2−0751, 4FGL J0808.2−0751, PMN J0808−0751, MRC 0805−077, 2MASSi J0808155−075109, Cul 0805−076, IRCF J080815.5−075109

PKS 0805−07 also known as PMN J0808−0751 and 4FGL J0808.2−0751, is a quasar located in the constellation of Monoceros. With a redshift of 1.83, light has taken at least 10 billion light-years to reach Earth.

== Characteristics ==
Classified a high redshift blazar, a type of powerful radio-loud active galactic nuclei containing a relativistic jet, pointing towards the direction of Earth, PKS 0805−07 shows emitted radiation, mainly detected in gamma-rays (E>~100 MeV) as detected by Large Area Telescope. The quasar is known to have an extreme variability across its entire electromagnetic spectrum. Based on the strength of optical spectral lines, which the equivalent width (EW) of the spectral line is found greater or less than 5 Å, PKS 0805−07 is further classified a flat-spectrum radio quasar (FSRQ) containing strong emission-lines.

Like many other FSRQs, PKS 0805−07 contains characteristics like a high bolometric luminosity, and thermal activity that is related to an accretion disk in the quasar's optical and ultraviolet (UV) spectra. It is also known to have characteristic radio polarization at 1.4 GHz, P_{1.4} > 1% and a spinning black hole.

As studied by researchers for its emission properties, PKS 0805−07 exhibits lower electron energy (γ _{p} ≲ 1.6 × 10^{3}) compared to BL Lacertae objects (BL Lacs) with a separation of Γ = -0.127 log l_{y} + 8.18 in γ-ray luminosity versus photon index plane with a success rate of 88.6\%. It also has a stronger magnetic field (B) with smaller electron-to-magnetic energy ratio (U _{e}/U _{B}) than BL Lacs. Moreover, PKS 0805−07 shows a core-jet morphology with at least five observing epochs at 15 GHz between January 1996, and August 2019, observed by Very Long Baseline Array. The quasar also has a core-dominated source, showing asymmetric features than lobe-dominated sources, which is caused by modest relativistic motion (β ≡ 0.20) within its radio lobes.

== Observations ==
Since April 2009, PKS 0805−07 was shown to have high levels of gamma-ray activity when detected by Large Area Telescope. Amongst other quasars, PKS 0805−07 has one of the fastest superluminal motions at that time.

Between 17 and 19, November 2022, an ongoing bright gamma-ray from PKS 0805−07 was observed by AGILE satellite. This source had a flux measured of F( > 100 MeV) = (2.7 +/- 0.8) × 10^{−6} photons/cm^{2}/s and around 6 sigma.
