= PKS 1148−001 =

Quasar in the constellation Virgo

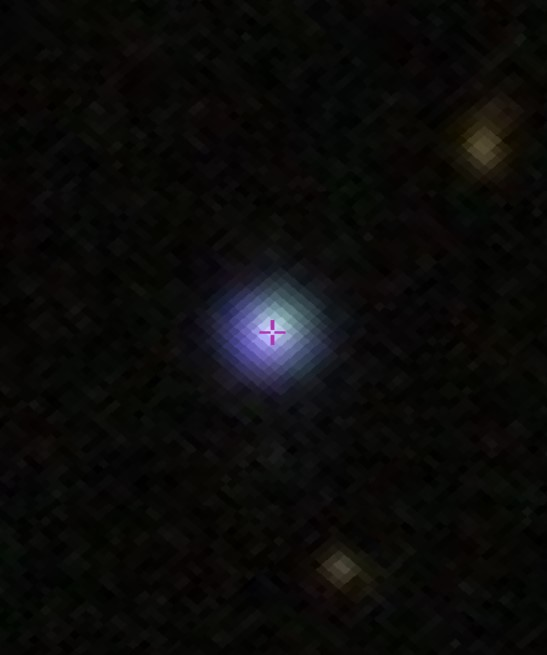
- PKS 1148−001 as observed by the Sloan Digital Sky Survey

Observation data (J2000.0 epoch)
- Constellation: Virgo
- Right ascension: 11^{h} 50^{m} 43.871^{s}
- Declination: −00° 23′ 54.20″
- Redshift: 1.979562

Characteristics
- Type: Optically variable, radio-loud quasar

Other designations
- UM 458, 4C −00.47, PGC 37034, QUEST 042860, MRC 1148−001, MG1 J115044−0024, OM -480, TXS 1148−001, 1RXS J115044.2−002349, CoNFIG 113

PKS 1148−001, also known as UM 458 and 4C −00.47, is a quasar in the constellation of Virgo. It has a measured redshift of approximately 1.98, placing it at a cosmological distance of roughly 10 billion light-years from Earth, depending on the cosmological parameters used.

PKS 1148−001 is classified as a radio-loud quasar and is a variable extragalactic radio source. High-resolution radio observations have revealed compact structure and a one-sided jet associated with the source.

== Radio structure ==
Observations using interplanetary scintillation and very-long-baseline interferometry found that the radio source associated with PKS 1148−001 has an apparent angular size of approximately 0.1 arcsecond.

Very-long-baseline observations have also detected a one-sided jet on milliarcsecond scales. The asymmetry of the observed jet is consistent with relativistic effects affecting emission from an active galactic nucleus. Radio jets in quasars are produced by material associated with an accreting supermassive black hole and can extend far beyond the central region of the host galaxy.

== See also ==
- Quasar
- Radio-loud quasar
- Blazar
- Active galactic nucleus
- Supermassive black hole
