= Alexander Dalgarno =

British physicist and father of molecular astrophysics

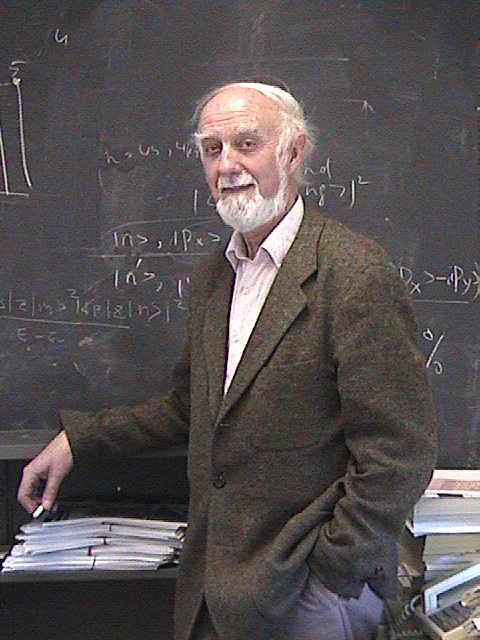
- Alex Dalgarno (© photo by:Lisa Bastille)
- Born: 5 January 1928; London, England
- Died: 9 April 2015 (aged 87)
- Scientific career
- Doctoral advisor: Harrie Massey; Richard Buckingham
- Doctoral students: Catherine Asaro; Ewine van Dishoeck; John T. Lewis; Wayne G. Roberge; Deborah K. Watson

Alexander Dalgarno FRS (5 January 1928 – 9 April 2015) was a British physicist who was a Phillips Professor of Astronomy at Harvard University.

== Biography ==
Alexander Dalgarno was born in London in 1928, and spent his childhood there. He was educated in mathematics and atomic physics at University College, London, earning a Ph.D. in theoretical physics in 1951 under the joint supervision of Harrie Massey and Richard Buckingham. He was an academic at the Queen's University, Belfast from 1951 to 1967 where he worked with Sir David Bates and rose from assistant lecturer to professor. In the 1950s, he laid the foundations for long-range atomic interaction studies which are of critical importance for today's interest in Bose–Einstein condensates.

In 1967, he moved to Harvard University to join their department of astronomy and held the positions of acting director of Harvard College Observatory, chairman of the department of astronomy, associate director of the Center for Astrophysics | Harvard & Smithsonian and director of the Institute for Theoretical Atomic and Molecular Physics. Dalgarno's research covered three main areas: theoretical atomic and molecular physics, astrophysics and aeronomy (the study of the upper atmosphere). He made contributions in theoretical chemistry, scattering theory, atmospheric physics & chemistry and astrophysics and was the author of more than 600 publications. Sir David Bates wrote in 1988 that "There is no greater figure than Alex in the history of atomic physics and its applications." Known as the "father of molecular astrophysics", Dalgarno was also a physicist at the Smithsonian Astrophysical Observatory and was formerly the editor of the Astrophysical Journal Letters.

Dalgarno was also cited in the Nebula Award winning novel The Quantum Rose by Catherine Asaro, a science-fiction novel based on Asaro's doctoral work while she was a Ph.D. student with Dalgarno.

He married Barbara Kane, from whom he was later divorced, and had four children. Later married to Emily Izsak - divorced.

== Awards ==
His work was recognized by many awards, including the prize of the International Academy of Quantum Molecular Science, the Davisson-Germer Prize of the American Physical Society (1980), the William F. Meggers Award of the Optical Society of America (1986), the Gold Medal of the Royal Astronomical Society (1986) and the Benjamin Franklin Medal in Physics from the Franklin Institute (2013).

He was a Fellow of the American Geophysical Union and the American Physical Society and a member of the U.S. National Academy of Sciences. He was elected a Fellow of the Royal Society in 1972 and awarded their prestigious Hughes Medal in 2002. He was also a member of the International Academy of Quantum Molecular Science.

In 1998, Asteroid 6941 was named Asteroid Dalgarno.
