= Deborah K. Watson =

American physicist

Deborah Kay Watson
- Education: Allegheny College Harvard University
- Known for: Many-body problem in quantum mechanics
- Awards: Edith Kinney Gaylord Presidential Professorship Regents' Award for Superior Research & Creative Activity Fellow of the American Physical Society
- Scientific career
- Workplaces: University of Oklahoma

Deborah Kay Watson is an American physicist known for her work on the many-body problem in quantum mechanics. She is a professor emerita of physics at the University of Oklahoma.

== Education and career ==
Watson is a 1972 graduate of Allegheny College and completed her Ph.D. in chemistry in 1977 at Harvard University. Her dissertation was in two parts, I. Time-dependent Hartree–Fock studies of small molecular systems and II. Adiabatic and resonance states of Li_{2} and dissociative recombination of Li_{2}+, and was supervised by Alexander Dalgarno.

Watson was a postdoctoral researcher in chemistry at the California Institute of Technology before joining the University of Oklahoma faculty. She served two terms as chair of the Theoretical Atomic, Molecular, and Optical Physics Community of the American Physical Society (APS), in 2005–2006 and 2006–2007. She retired from the University of Oklahoma in 2016.

== Recognition ==
In 1978, Watson's various contribution in research and creative activities at the University of Oklahoma was recognized through the Regents' Award for Superior Research & Creative Activity.

She was also named the Edith Kinney Gaylor Presidential Professor of Physics at the University of Oklahoma in 2004.

In 2020 she was named a Fellow of the American Physical Society, after a nomination from the APS Division of Atomic, Molecular & Optical Physics, "for the innovative use of group theory and graphical techniques toward the solution of the quantum many-body problem".
