= PKS 0438−436 =

Quasar in the constellation Caelum

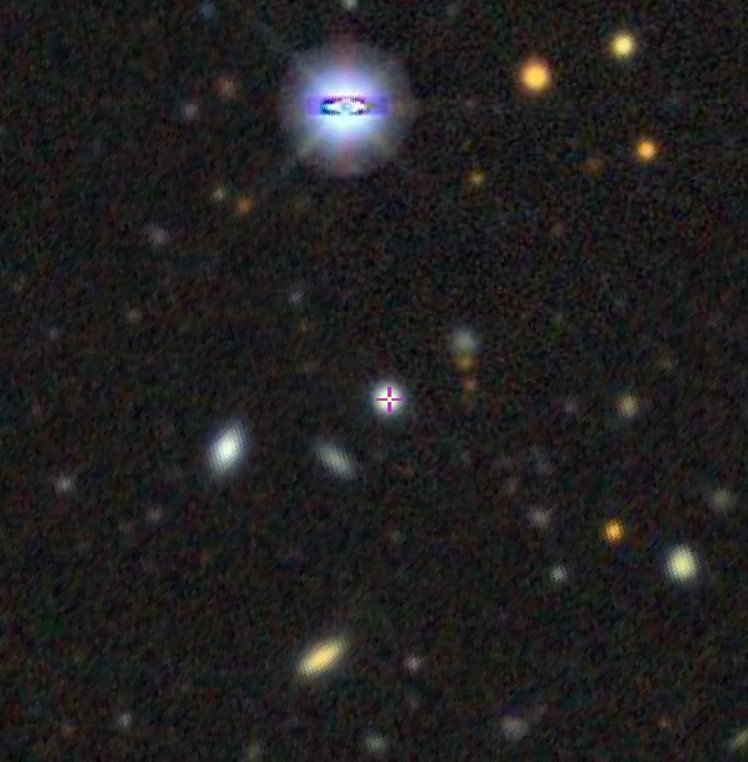
- PKS 0438−436 captured by DESI Legacy Surveys

Observation data (J2000.0 epoch)
- Constellation: Caelum
- Right ascension: 04^{h} 40^{m} 17.18^{s}
- Declination: −43° 33′ 08.60″
- Redshift: 2.863000
- Heliocentric radial velocity: 858,306 km/s
- Distance: 11.2 Gly (light travel time distance)
- Apparent magnitude (V): 0.54
- Apparent magnitude (B): 0.43
- Surface brightness: 18.8

Characteristics
- Type: HPQ, RLQ

Other designations
- PKS J0440−4333, PMN J0440−4332, PGC 2824039, WMAP 147, MRC 0438−436, OCARS 0438−436, RX J0440.3−4333

PKS 0438−436, also known as PKS J0440−4333, is a quasar located in constellation Caelum. With a high redshift of 2.86, the object is located 11.2 billion light-years from Earth and is classified as a blazar due to its flat-spectrum radio source, (in terms of the flux density as (F_{v} ~ V^{−a}) with α < 0.5 and its optical polarization.

== Characteristics ==
PKS 0438−436 features the second strongest known synchrotron core, in which three strong absorption lines are superposed on Lo emission, and two of them are at longer wavelengths. PKS 0438−436 is said to be t highly variable, changing from 4.7% to 1.7% with a 150 degree swing in position angle over seven months. However, the quasar has an enormous low-frequency flux density. It is 160 MHz flux density at 7.9 Jy, compared to the most luminous blazars equivalent to 151 MHz luminosity of L_{151} ≈ 4.5 × 10^{28} WH z^{−1} sr^{−1}. This is the very rare object that lies near the high end of the luminosity distribution at both low frequency and high frequency (≥5 GHz).

Moreover, through the study of ROSAT PSPC spectrum, PKS 0438−436 shows an unexpected absorption of ~1 × 10^22^ cm^-2^, assuming it occurs at the source. Only one other high-luminosity quasar (of >~ 50 observed by Einstein) shows significant absorption in its X-ray spectrum. Of the common line-of-sight absorbers, only highly ionized Lyα forest clouds may be able to explain this amount of absorption. This is mainly due to primarily to heavy elements such as Oxygen, Neon, Magnesium, Silicon, Sulfur, raising the possibility of measuring early universe abundances via X-ray absorption in this and like quasars. PKS 0438−436 may be a high-redshift member of a population of quasars which can contribute to the X-ray background above 2 keV, without being detectable by previous imaging missions.

== Further observatio ==
Researchers found there are two unusual aspects of this luminous blazar. Firstly, its the large L151, typically indicative of luminous radio lobes in which energy is stored and the lack of a detection in the gamma-rays to date.

The large-scale radio structure and the jet power

To investigate on this matter, researchers determined the radio lobe morphology and flux density to get an estimate the long-term, time-averaged radio jet power. Such estimates of instantaneous blazar jet power are often based on its radio core and γ-ray emission, according to methods of Ghisellini et al. (2010) and the estimated Doppler enhancement factor, D, can introduce very significant uncertainty. Estimating Q from the lobe luminosity of PKS 0438−436 is not instantaneous power. Yet, it has the virtue that the lobe luminosity and therefore Q not sensitive to the large uncertainty in D.

Researchers utilized the estimate of Q through the Oxford method. This was calibrated with a sample of 170 double-lobe radio sources which were selected on the basis of low-frequency emission (151 MHz–178 MHz). The calibrated estimator depends on only one parameter, a single value of flux density which is used as a surrogate for the flux density restricted to the radio lobes. This is the strength of the method; a single dish measurement at low frequency can be used to estimate Q for sources not in the calibration sample. Thus, a single-dish measurement is not applicable to blazars in general due to dilution of the lobe flux density with core and jet flux density.

As for choice of L151, it is used as a surrogate for the luminosity of the radio lobes, motivated by the assumption that the core emission is attenuated by synchrotron self-absorption at 151 MHz. (Willott et al. 1999) The energy stored in the lobes, U, can be estimated from L151 and since the lobe plasma has low velocity this value will not be strongly affected by D. They calculated the equation as Q = fU_{base} (L_{151}) divided by T proposed by Willott et al. (1999), where T is the source age, U_{base}(L_{151}) is the minimum energy in the lobe assuming a low-frequency cut-off at 10 MHz, the jet axis is 60° to the line of sight (LOS), there is no protonic contribution, and 100% filling factor. The quantity f incorporates deviations of actual radio lobes from these assumptions as well as energy lost through expanding the lobe into the external medium, back flow from the head of the lobe, and kinetic turbulence.

From there, the equation relating T and Q (EQW9 hereafter) is derived by considering the evolution of the lobe dimension, R, in models of lobe head advance into an ambient medium. Differentiating EQW9 yields an equation for dR/dt (EQW10 hereafter) which is equated to the lobe advance speeds derived from the distribution of length asymmetry between the two lobes of a sample of quasars. EQW4, EQW9, and EQW10 were solved simultaneously to eliminate R and T, yielding as a function of f and L151 which is presented in a scatter plot of the calibration sample according to Willott et al. (1999) where Q ≈ 3.8 × 10^{45} fL ^{6/7}_{151} ergs^{−1}. There, they were able to collect the data, whom they calculated it as Q = 1.65 + 0.55 × 10^{47} ergs^{−1}.

Nature of radio lobes and jet power

Researcher noted the northeast and southwest extensions in emission were detected in 327 MHz, according to Very Long Baseline Array (VLBA) observations of Kanekar et al. (2009). These features appear to be a partially resolved jet and counter-jet on scales ~100 mas from the unresolved radio core. These smaller-scale features are buried deep within the unresolved JVLA radio core (i.e., an order of magnitude smaller than the resolution of the 2.5 GHz observations). The jet and counter-jet directions detected with the VLBA are consistent with jets that connect to the extended emission. For this, they confirmed PKS 0438−436 as a classical radio source, which they assume the radio lobes is α_{lobe} = 0.9. Using the estimated calculation of radio lobes as well as the lobe flux density at 2.5 GHz, and values of (L_{151} 3.0 × 10^{28} W Hz^{−1} sr^{−1}) and (Q = 1.14 + 0.38 × 10^{47} erg s^{−1}), this suggests the previous calculation is overestimated due to core and jet contributions to the 160 MHz flux density. The newest calculation is more accurate since the method of Willott et al. (1999) assumes that L151 is a surrogate for the lobe luminosity. If αlobe were 1.05 then the 7.9 Jy single-dish flux density at 160 MHz could be attributed entirely to the lobes. However, a spectrum this steep is an extremely rare circumstance.

Luminosity of accretion flow

Researchers then analyzed the optical spectrum to get an estimate of the thermal bolometric luminosity of the accretion flow, Lbol. This was obtained, to quantify the thermal luminosity of the accretion flow and the strength of the broad emission lines. Due to the high redshift, the ultraviolet emission line spectrum is redshifted into the optical band. The earlier spectrum (1977 November 18) is from the RGO spectrograph on the 3.9 m Anglo Australian Telescope and this observation was used in the original determination of the quasar properties and redshift.

The spectra from UVES, the Ultraviolet and Visual Echelle Spectrograph, on the VLT were retrieved from the ESO Spectral Data Products of the Phase 3 archive portal. The UVES spectrum shows the results from the combination of 11 flux-calibrated spectra. On September 14, 2002, a total of eight spectra were taken: four covering 3730 Å–5000 Å and four covering 6650 Å–10420 Å. On October 30, 2003, three spectra covering 4720 Å–6830 Å were combined. A gap is present on the blue side of the redshifted CIVλ1549, but the profile is presumably unaffected. There is also a small absolute flux mismatch around 6800 Å between 2002 and 2003. The spectral resolution of UVES is about R = λ/δλ ~ 40,000 with the slit opened to 1008. Researchers estimated the flux density of the continuum as F (6600 A) 1.2 × 10^{−16} ergs^{−1} cm^{−2} A^{−1} and F (6600 A) 6.0 × 10^{−17} ergs^{−1} cm^{−2} A^{−1}.

== Gamma-Ray Flare ==
A preliminary FERMI detection of PKS 0438−436 on December 11, 2016, was observed by Large Area Telescope; it previously had no gamma-ray detections. An analysis of Fermi-LAT data was performed on PKS 0438-436 using the fermipy framework. The data were selected over a time span of six days, between 57731.0 MJD 57737.0 MJD, which researchers selected photons from a region of interest (ROI) with a radius of 10°, centered on PKS 0438−436, and built a model of the ROI using sources within 15° distance from the ROI center and reported in the Fermi-LAT Third Source Catalog (Acero et al. 2015), including both the emission from the Galactic diffuse and the isotropic backgrounds.

For the light curve extraction, researchers used bins of 18 hr, for a time range starting on MJD 57731.00 and ending on MJD 57736.25. For each bin a binned likelihood analysis was performed, using a power-law function, and freeing all the sources located within a distance of 5° from the ROI center. The light curve is shown, in which data reports the integrated photon flux in the 100 MeV–100 GeV energy range, and the corresponding apparent luminosity. The source is detected in four bins with a significance, and the flaring activity in concentrated over a time span of 54 hr centered on MJD 57734.4.

The source from PKS 0438−436 is detected with a significance of ≳10σ during the full flare period, and with a significance ranging from ≳3σ to ≳8σ, during each time bin. There is formally no detection above 10 GeV, only upper limits. The lack of detected photons arises from two conspiring issues. First is the large distance that makes for low number statistics even for this very luminous flare. Second is the EBL (extra background light) opacity. Gamma-ray extinction occurs as a consequence of pair creation in the soft background photon field.

They have calculated the EBL attenuation using the γ − γ optical depths evaluated at z = 2.85 from the template model from Finke et al. (2010). The red dotted–dashed line shows an expected attenuation, which the EBL starts to be relevant above ≈70 GeV, and the upper limits in spectral energy distributions (SEDs) starts at ≈10 GeV.

Using the SWIFT spectrum, observed two days after the flare, obtained using the Swift XRT product generator10, the X-ray spectrum is more luminous and harder than historical X-ray spectra. The data are not contemporaneous, but the strong inverse Compton γ-ray peak >5 × 1049 erg s−1 is much stronger than the synchrotron peak, ~2 × 1047 erg s−1, characteristic of strong quasar gamma-ray sources. The luminosity of the flare is ~100 times the quiescent upper limit (August 4, 2008 – July 4, 2009) in Böck et al. (2013), indicating extreme variability. Since it is rarely detected, the time-averaged γ-ray luminosity is not extreme. However, the flare is ≈55%–65% as luminous (in an 18 hr window) as the historically large flare of 3C 454.3 even though the peak of the SED is redshifted out of the FERMI observing window.

Considering D, PKS 0438−436 is of interest to estimate the intrinsic luminosity of the flare. For an unresolved source, D = δ^{3+a}, where δ is the Doppler factor, the value of D ≈ 15^{4} ≈ 5 × 10^{4}using the average of δ = 15, high optical polarization quasars are estimated from time variability. This implies an intrinsic luminosity of the flare. These radiation losses are easily sustainable by a jet with a power similar to the long-term time average. This findings suggest, PKS 0438−436 has only been detected once in γ-rays, likely an extreme manifestation of external Compton scattering in a relativistic jet for which the apparent luminosity is very sensitive to the geometry.
