= NGC 5539 =

Lenticular galaxy in the constellation Boötes

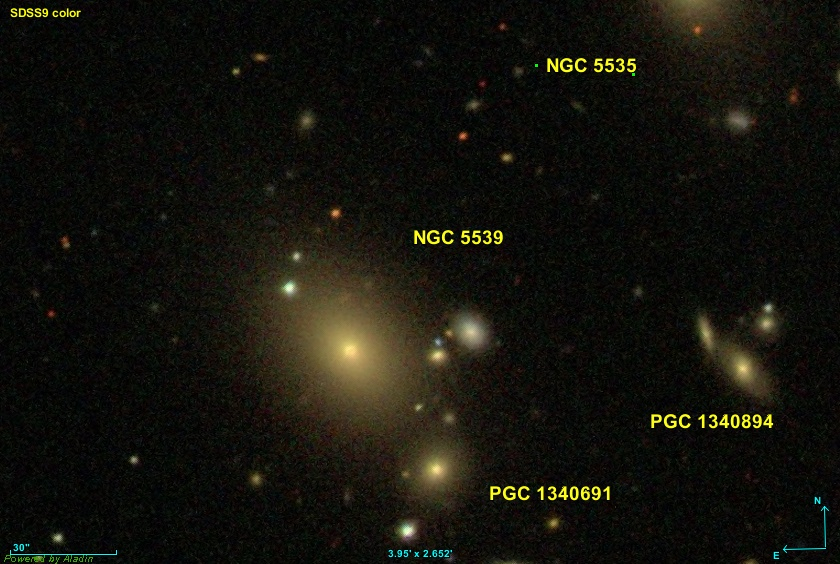

Observation data (J2000 epoch)
- Constellation: Boötes
- Right ascension: 14h 17m 37.8s
- Declination: +08d 10m 46.57s
- Redshift: 0.058518
- Heliocentric radial velocity: 17,381 km/s
- Distance: 857 Mly (262.6 Mpc)
- Group or cluster: Abell 1890
- Apparent magnitude (V): 14.2
- Apparent magnitude (B): 13.7
- Surface brightness: 11.40

Characteristics
- Type: cD; BrClg
- Size: 273,000 ly
- Apparent size (V): 0.4' x 0.3'

Other designations
- PGC 51054, MCG +01-36-033, UZC J141737.8+081047, LEDA 51054, 2MASX J14173775+0810468

NGC 5539 is a large lenticular galaxy in the constellation Boötes. It is located 857 million light-years away and was discovered by John Herschel on 24 April 1830. According to Herschel, he found it quite large and irregular. NGC 5539 is about 273,000 light-years in diameter, meaning it is much larger compared to the Milky Way and its neighbor, the Andromeda Galaxy. It is the brightest cluster galaxy in Abell 1890.

It is said NGC 5539 can be classified as a high surface brightness galaxy with a surface brightness value of 11.40 mag/am^{2}.
