= Atomic and molecular astrophysics =

Field of study on atomic and molecular particles in space

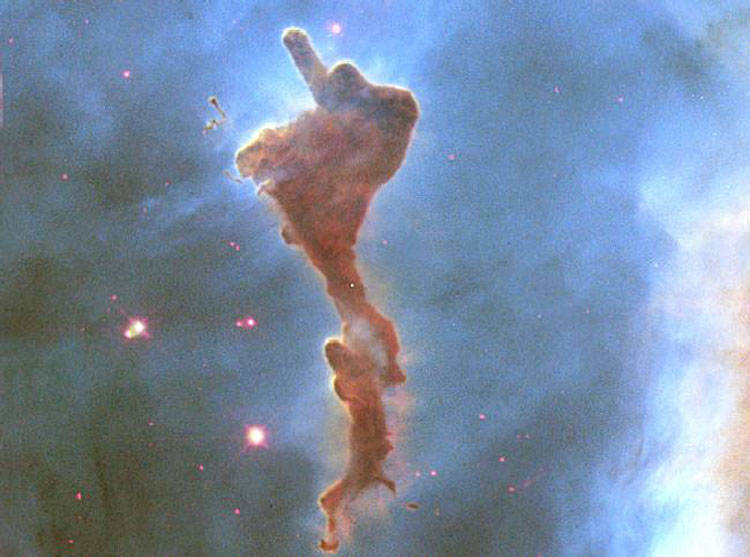
Within a few million years the light from bright stars will have boiled away this molecular cloud of gas and dust. The cloud has broken off from the Carina Nebula. Newly formed stars are visible nearby, their images reddened by blue light being preferentially scattered by the pervasive dust. This image spans about two light years and was taken by the orbiting Hubble Space Telescope in 1999.

Atomic astrophysics is concerned with performing atomic physics calculations that will be useful to astronomers and using atomic data to interpret astronomical observations. Atomic physics plays a key role in astrophysics as astronomers' only information about a particular object comes through the light that it emits, and this light arises through atomic transitions.

Molecular astrophysics, developed into a rigorous field of investigation by theoretical astrochemist Alexander Dalgarno beginning in 1967, concerns the study of emission from molecules in space. There are 110 currently known interstellar molecules. These molecules have large numbers of observable transitions. Lines may also be observed in absorption—for example the highly redshifted lines seen against the gravitationally lensed quasar PKS1830-211. High energy radiation, such as ultraviolet light, can break the molecular bonds which hold atoms in molecules. In general then, molecules are found in cool astrophysical environments. The most massive objects in our galaxy are giant clouds of molecules and dust known as giant molecular clouds. In these clouds, and smaller versions of them, stars and planets are formed. One of the primary fields of study of molecular astrophysics is star and planet formation. Molecules may be found in many environments, however, from stellar atmospheres to those of planetary satellites. Most of these locations are relatively cool, and molecular emission is most easily studied via photons emitted when the molecules make transitions between low rotational energy states. One molecule, composed of the abundant carbon and oxygen atoms, and very stable against dissociation into atoms, is carbon monoxide (CO). The wavelength of the photon emitted when the CO molecule falls from its lowest excited state to its zero energy, or ground, state is 2.6mm, or 115 gigahertz. This frequency is a thousand times higher than typical FM radio frequencies. At these high frequencies, molecules in the Earth's atmosphere can block transmissions from space, and telescopes must be located in dry (water is an important atmospheric blocker), high sites. Radio telescopes must have very accurate surfaces to produce high fidelity images.

On February 21, 2014, NASA announced a greatly upgraded database for tracking polycyclic aromatic hydrocarbons (PAHs) in the universe. According to scientists, more than 20% of the carbon in the universe may be associated with PAHs, possible starting materials for the formation of life. PAHs seem to have been formed shortly after the Big Bang, are widespread throughout the universe, and are associated with new stars and exoplanets.

== See also ==
- Alexander Dalgarno (physicist)
- Astrochemistry
- Astrophysics
- Atomic, molecular, and optical physics
- Cosmochemistry
- Interstellar medium
- Molecular modelling
- Quantum dynamics
- Spectroscopy
