= Molonglo Reference Catalogue of Radio Sources =

Astronomical catalog

The Molonglo Reference Catalogue of Radio Sources is an astronomical catalog containing 12,141 discrete sources from a 408 MHz survey with the Molonglo Radio Telescope.
