= Victoria Alonsoperez =

Uruguayan electronics engineer and entrepreneur (born 1986/87)

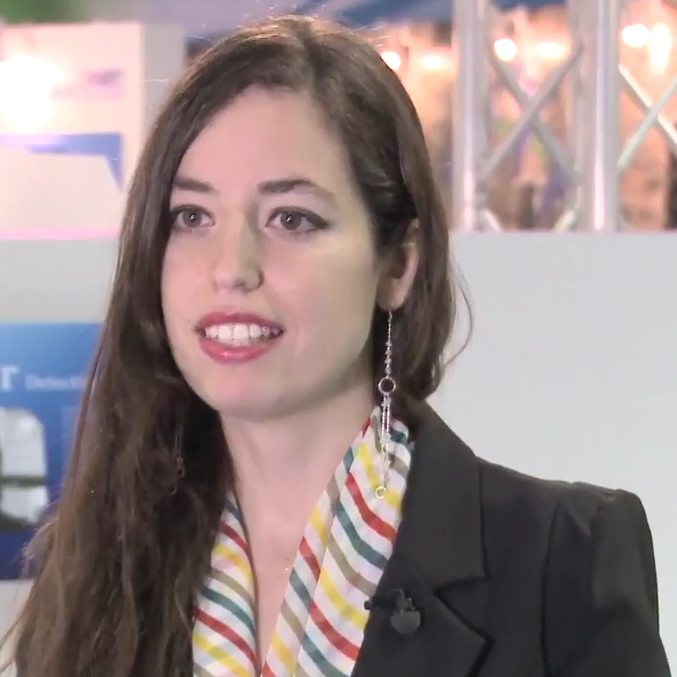
- Born: 1986 or 1987 (age 38–39); Uruguay
- Occupations: Telecoms engineer, entrepreneur
- Notable work: Chipsafer

Victoria Alonsoperez is an Uruguayan electronics and telecommunication engineer and entrepreneur. She invented Chipsafer, a software platform to track cattle, and remotely and autonomously detect anomalies in their behaviour.

== Early life ==
María Victoria Alonsoperez was born in Uruguay. She studied electrical and space engineering at the University of the Republic in Montevideo. For her undergraduate thesis, she worked on system designs for the first Uruguayan satellite. In 2009, Alonsoperez was awarded a youth grant from the International Astronautical Federation which allowed her to participate in several astronautical congresses and become involved in the Space Generation Advisory Council. In 2011, she attended a space studies program at the International Space University and participated in a group competition, winning the Barcelona Zero-Gravity Aerobatics Challenge with two colleagues. She pursued a graduate degree in aerospace engineering, the first Uruguayan to study in the field.

== Career ==
As a twelve-year-old-child, Alonsoperez invented a monitoring system to track the behavior of cattle, which could be used to prevent a repeat disaster of the 2001 Foot-and-mouth disease outbreak. Eleven years later, while working as a teaching associate the International Space University, she heard of the International Telecommunication Union's Young Innovators Competition. Alonsoperez developed her idea into a product called Chipsafer, sent it to the competition, and won. In 2013, Alonsoperez won the Best Young Inventor Award from the World Intellectual Property Organization. In 2014, the Inter-American Development Bank named Chipsafer the Most Innovative Startup of Latin America and the Caribbean, and the MIT Technology Review selected her as the Innovator of the Year for Argentina and Uruguay.

One of the benefits of winning the competition was a course in entrepreneurship, where Alonsoperez learned how to set up a development company and create a prototype. She founded IEETech and with seed money from the Uruguayan National Research and Innovation Agency, Alonsoperez developed the prototype, tested it and moved into commercializing Chipsafer. Once the prototype was created, Alonsoperez began to search for investors to buy the device for broad scale testing. The device is a type of solar-powered collar which sends data to IEETech's servers which then analyze the data to detect anomalies. Servers can modify the information received or update function remotely, and cattle owners can modify data and desired output for customized reports. In 2015, Alonsoperez partnered with local farmers and the University of the Republic for further testing and as a way to build relationships and later that year was nominated as one of the most inspirational women of the year by they BBC 100 Women series.

In 2016, Alonsoperez has been working to attract investor capitalists from Silicon Valley, after an initial product consultation in China proved difficult.
