= Akshata Krishnamurthy =

Aerospace engineer and researcher

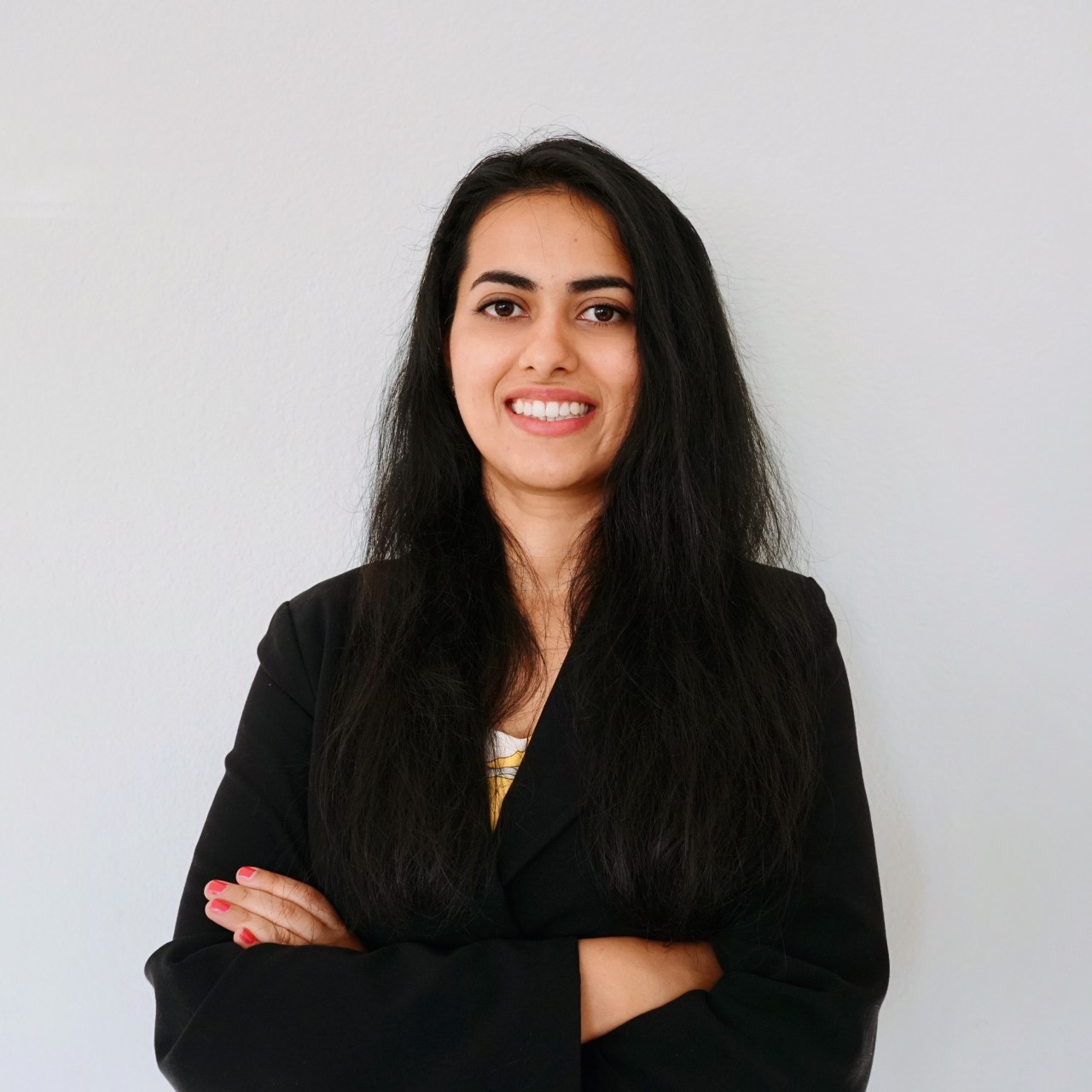
- Born: 27 December 1990 (age 35); Bengaluru, Karnataka, India
- Citizenship: Indian
- Education: R.V. College of Engineering (BS); University of Illinois Urbana-Champaign (MS); Massachusetts Institute of Technology (PhD)
- Engineering career
- Discipline: Space Systems
- Employer: NASA Jet Propulsion Laboratory
- Projects: Mars 2020; NISAR; TESS; ASTERIA
- Awards: Luigi G. Napolitano Award; IAF Emerging Space Leader

Akshata Krishnamurthy (born 27 December 1990) is an Indian space systems engineer working as Principal Investigator and Science Phase Lead at the NASA Jet Propulsion Laboratory.

She is currently working on Mars 2020. She was named to Fortune India's "Most Powerful Women"

== Education ==
Krishnamurthy was born on 27 December 1990 in Bengaluru, Karnataka, India. She completed her schooling and undergraduate education at R.V. College of Engineering before moving to the United States to pursue a Master's degree in Aerospace Engineering from the University of Illinois at Urbana-Champaign.

Krishnamurthy earned her PhD in Aeronautics and Astronautics from the Massachusetts Institute of Technology (MIT). Her PhD research focused on instrument calibration and performance improvement for space-based telescope missions for exoplanet detection. The results of her research contributed to the Transiting Exoplanet Survey Satellite (TESS) and Arcsecond Space Telescope Enabling Research in Astrophysics (ASTERIA) missions. Krishnamurthy and her colleagues contributed to the discovery of several exoplanets and the characterization of HD 59640 as an eruptive variable star with flares. Other projects included the Mars 2020 Mars Oxygen ISRU Experiment (MOXIE).

At MIT, she was the President of the Graduate Association of Aeronautics and Astronautics (GA^3) student organization and Co-Chair of the MIT India Conference.

== Career ==
Krishnamurthy interned at NASA's Jet Propulsion Laboratory as part of the ASTERIA mission while working on her PhD. In April 2021, she and her colleagues received the NASA Group Achievement Award for their work with the CubeSat ASTERIA. Following graduation, she was employed as a systems engineer and science data system lead at the Jet Propulsion Laboratory. She also started as a systems engineer on the NASA-ISRO Synthetic Aperture Radar (NISAR) mission and later became the Science Phase Lead.

Krishnamurthy is currently a robotic operations systems engineer working on the Mars 2020 Perseverance Mission robotic operations and a principal investigator on a strategic university research program with the Massachusetts Institute of Technology. She previously served as an instrument engineer on NASA's Transiting Exoplanet Survey Satellite (TESS) and as a co-investigator on ASTERIA missions. She is the first Indian to operate the Perseverance Mars rover.

== Awards and recognition ==
- Luigi G. Napolitano Award from the International Astronautical Federation for contributions to aerospace science (2017)
- Dr. Robbin Chapman Excellence Through Adversity Award from the MIT Office of Graduate Education (2018)
- Amelia Earhart Fellowship by the Zonta International Foundation (July 2018)
- Emerging Space Leader Award by the International Astronautical Federation (September 2018)
- MIT Graduate Woman of Excellence Award (2019)
- Space and Satellite Professionals International's 20 under 35 list of top space professionals (2021)
