= Luigi G. Napolitano =

Italian aerospace engineer

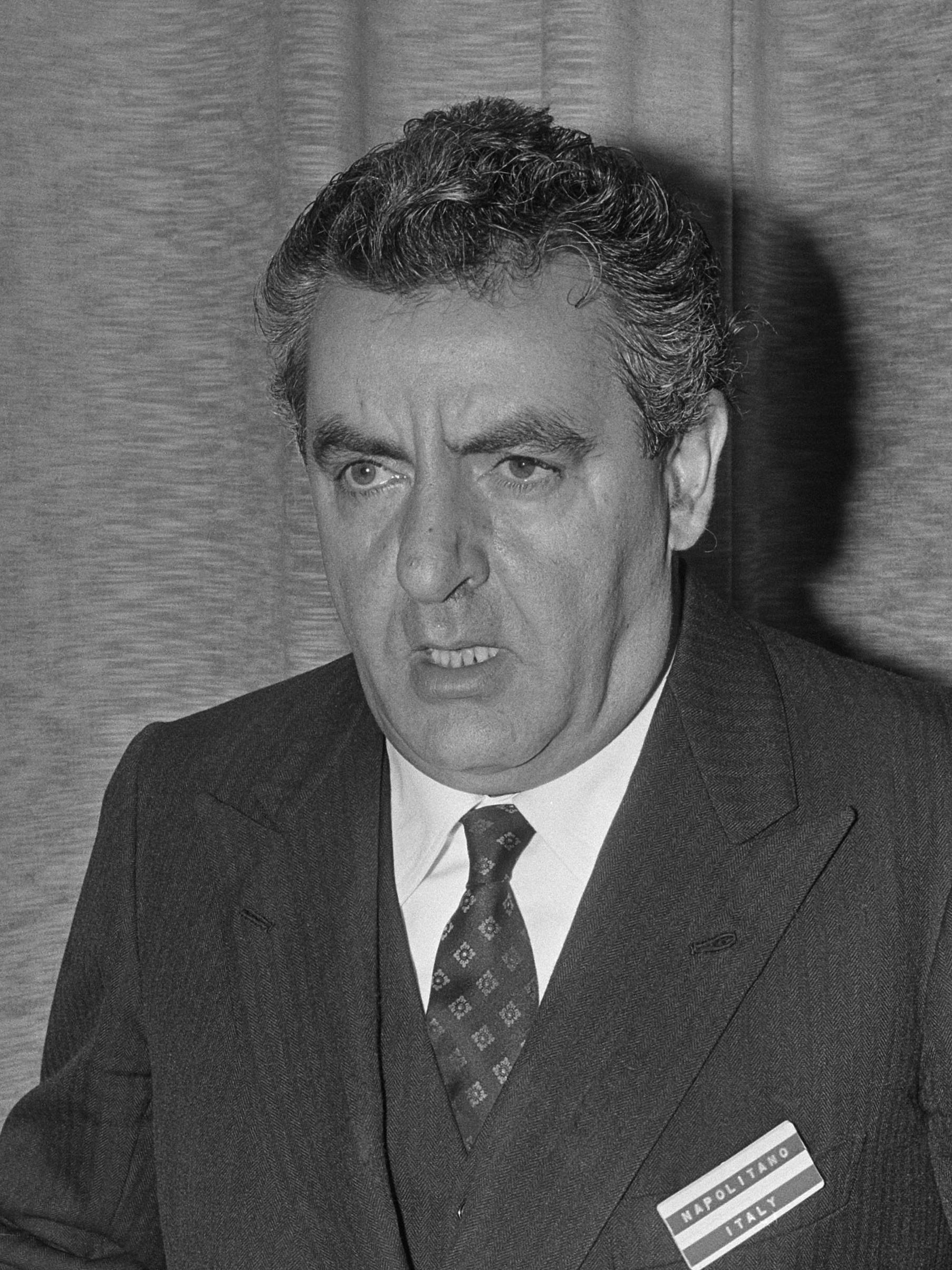
- Napolitano in 1974
- Born: Luigi Gerardo Napolitano; June 2, 1928; Naples, Kingdom of Italy
- Died: July 23, 1991 (aged 63); Estes Park, Colorado, U.S.
- Spouse: Liliana Boccolini

Academic background
- Education: University of Naples Federico II (BS); New York University (MS, PhD)
- Thesis: Theoretical and experimental investigations in the mixing of two homogeneous streams (1955)
- Doctoral advisor: Antonio Ferri

Academic work
- Main interests: Compressible flow; turbulence; fluid dynamics; microgravity; fluid mechanics

Luigi Gerardo Napolitano (2 June 1928 – 23 July 1991) was an Italian aerospace engineer and fluid dynamicist. He designed Spacelab fluid dynamics experiments on the Space Shuttle program and helped establish the European Low Gravity Research Association in 1979.

Napolitano was president of the International Astronautical Federation twice between 1966 and 1974. He lobbied for the establishment of the Italian Aerospace Research Centre in historically-impoverished southern Italy and served as its first president for three weeks until his death.

In 1993, the International Astronautical Congress established the Luigi G. Napolitano Award in his honour.

== Early life and education ==
Napolitano was born in 1928 in Ponticelli, a suburb east of Naples. He was the second son of Clementina Tolino and Ferdinando Napolitano, a medical doctor. He had two sisters, Fernanda and Pina, and was passionate about music since childhood. Napolitano attended the Giuseppe Garibaldi classical high school in Naples, where he performed theatre. In 1947, he returned to Ponticelli to live with his parents before enrolling in university.

He attended the Polytechnic University of Naples, where he studied mechanical engineering under General Umberto Nobile, the Italian engineer and Arctic explorer. Napolitano developed an interest in flight and mathematics as Nobile's protégé, graduating in 1951.

After briefly teaching at the Elena di Savoia high school in Naples, Napolitano moved to Rome to study aeronautical engineering at the Sapienza University of Rome under Luigi Broglio, architect of Italy's satellite program. At Nobile's recommendation, he won a Fulbright scholarship to study in New York in 1953.

During his voyage to study at the Polytechnic Institute of Brooklyn, he met Milly and James Harford, a future leader of the American Rocket Society in New York. Initially interested in studying helicopter technology, he was persuaded to pursue aerodynamics research after meeting Antonio Ferri. He shared his research with other Italian scientists, including Massimo Trella and Carlo Buongiorno. Napolitano earned a doctorate from New York University (NYU) in 1955, writing a dissertation on compressible laminar mixing problems under the guidance of Ferri.

== Career ==
After graduating from NYU, he returned to Italy and joined the faculty of the University of Naples. He became a full professor of aerodynamics in 1960 and was director of the Umberto Nobile Institute of Aerodynamics at the university until 1977.

Napolitano published extensively on aerodynamics and gas dynamics. He studied the effects of pressure gradients and turbulence on fluid dynamics and efficient mixing. His later interests broadened to encompass acoustics, applied mechanics, fluid physics, and life sciences in microgravity.

In 1965, he was invited to give a series of lectures at the University of California, Berkeley, and in 1967 he became a professor at the Sorbonne University in Paris. He collaborated with Marcel Barrère, a French rocket propulsion expert at ONERA, and later gave lectures on boundary layers in hypersonic flight at the Von Karman Institute for Fluid Dynamics in Brussels.

He was president of the International Astronautical Federation (IAF) from 1966 to 1968, the first Italian to be elected to the position, and again from 1972 to 1974. Napolitano also served as director of the Department of Fluid Mechanics at the International Centre for Mechanical Sciences (CISM) in Udine from 1970 to 1974, after which he became a professor at the École Nationale Supérieure de Mécanique et d'Aérotechnique in Poitiers, France.

In 1979, Napolitano helped found the European Low Gravity Research Association (ELGRA) and served as secretary general. He was elected president from 1981 to 1986. In 1983, he resumed directorship of the Umberto Nobile Institute of Aerodynamics in Naples until 1991.

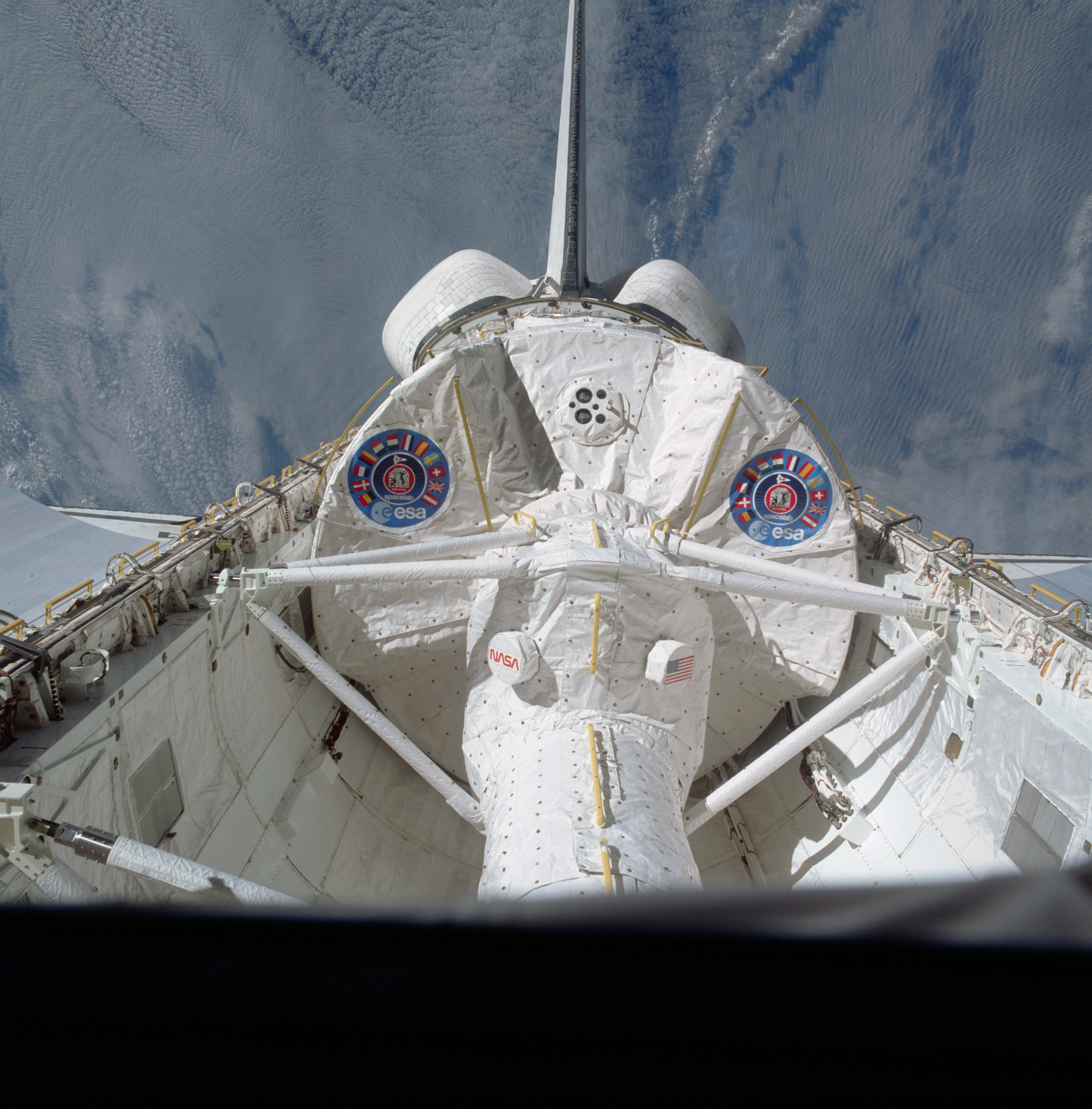
Spacelab module in the cargo bay of Space Shuttle Columbia (1983)

He conducted experiments aboard the European Space Agency's (ESA) Spacelab carried by NASA's Space Shuttle. Napolitano developed the Fluid Physics Module, an instrument designed to study the Marangoni effect which flew on STS-9 in 1983 and STS-61-A in 1985. He organized the Colombus Symposiums for European countries to discuss research to conduct on the Columbus module on the International Space Station and was an associate member of the American Institute of Aeronautics and Astronautics (AIAA).

Napolitano founded the Microgravity Advanced Research and Support Center (MARS) at the University of Naples in collaboration with Alenia Spazio. In 1990, he was appointed a member of the Italian National Academy, and he was vice president of materials and fluid science at ESA. He was a member of the board of the Italian Space Agency (ASI) beginning in 1988 and served as founder and president of the Italian Aerospace Research Centre (CIRA) from July 1991 until his death.

He died suddenly on 23 July 1991, in Estes Park, Colorado, aged 63. He had travelled to lead NASA's Space Station Users Panel (SSUP) conference, which explored the use of the proposed Space Station Freedom for research collaboration with ESA.

== Legacy ==
The International Astronautical Congress (IAC) established the Luigi G. Napolitano Award in 1993 in his honour, presented annually to scientists under the age of 30 who contributed significantly to the advancement of aerospace science. The award was endowed by the Napolitano family until 2022.

The University of Naples named the Luigi Gerardo Napolitano Institute of Aerospace after him. The 70 MW Scirocco Plasma Wind Tunnel Complex at CIRA bears his name. The Luigi Gerardo Napolitano Society was established as a scientific society in 2006.

== Personal life ==
Napolitano married Liliana Boccolini on 1 April 1962. They had three children.

He was committed to stimulating economic development in Southern Italy, a historically impoverished area, in response to the Southern question. He proposed the establishment of the Mediterranean Institute of Technology research park and lobbied strongly for the Italian Aerospace Research Centre to be established in Capua, north of Naples.

== Books ==
- Computational Gas Dynamics (1978); Napolitano and Belotserkovskii; Springer-Verlag. ISBN 3-7091-2732-7
- Microgravity Sciences and Processes (1982); Acta Astronautica. ISBN 978-0-08-029985-3
- Magneto-fluid-dynamics: Current Papers and Abstracts (1962); Napolitano and Contursi; AGARD.
