= Temidayo Isaiah Oniosun =

Nigerian space scientist

- Born: Temidayo Isaiah Oniosun; Okaka, Oke-Ogun, Oyo State, Nigeria
- Education: Federal University of Technology, Akure; University of Strathclyde; University of Delaware
- Occupations: Businessperson; Space scientist

Temidayo Isaiah Oniosun is a Nigerian space scientist and businessperson. He is the founder of Space in Africa and the former regional coordinator for Space Generation Advisory Council for Africa.

== Early life and education ==
Temidayo Isaiah Oniosun was born in Okaka and grew up in Oyo, Nigeria where he had his primary and secondary education.

He graduated with a bachelor of technology degree in meteorology from the Federal University of Technology, Akure in 2016, has a master's degree in satellite applications from the University of Strathclyde Glasgow, and a PhD from the University of Delaware, USA with a dissertation on the "Political Economy of Space Development in Africa"

In May 2015, as a student of the Federal University of Technology, Akure, he led the university space club to launch a balloon to space in a contest.

== Career ==
Oniosun was elected the regional coordinator for Africa for the Space Generation Advisory Council in February 2017 and re-elected for a second term in 2019.

In 2018, Oniosun founded Space in Africa as a platform that covers business, technology, discoveries, events, and political information on the African space and satellite industry.

In June 2019, he led Space in Africa in raising seed investment from AC Ventures from Florida.

In July 2020, while speaking on Sunday Extra on Australian Broadcasting Corporation's Radio National, he explained how African countries are looking to space to solve problems on the ground.

He is an advisor to Proudly Human, an initiative of which is the Off-World Project, a series of habitation experiments in Earth's most extreme environments. Oniosun has led several strategy and policy consulting projects for both government and commercial stakeholders. In 2021 he led the African Union Commission baseline studies on the four-space segments and the socio-economic benefits for the establishment and operationalization of the African Space Agency.

=== Space in Africa and company growth ===
In 2018, Oniosun founded Space in Africa, a media, analytics, and consulting firm focused on the African space and satellite industry. The company is headquartered in Lagos, Nigeria, and has since expanded with an office in Tallinn, Estonia.

Notably, the firm’s annual African Space Industry Annual Reports, first released in 2019, have become authoritative references. The 2019 edition alone valued Africa’s space industry at over US $7 billion, with projections to exceed US $10 billion by 2024.

=== NewSpace Africa conference ===
In 2018, Oniosun founded the NewSpace Africa Conference, an annual gathering that brings together policymakers, space agency officials, private companies, and academic experts. The conference has been hosted in Kenya, Côte d’Ivoire, Angola, and, in 2025, was held in Cairo, Egypt.

The 2025 edition took place from April 21 to 24 at Egypt Space City, with the theme "Empowering Africa’s Economy through Space‑Driven Innovation". It featured over 500 expert delegates and 400 exhibitors from more than 65 countries. Crucially, the conference served as the venue for the official inauguration of the African Space Agency, which was formalized during the event in April 2025 in Cairo.

=== Egusi in Space Mission ===
In August 2025, Oniosun led Nigeria's first agricultural payload to space, sending melon seeds (egusi) from Nigeria aboard a SpaceX Falcon 9 rocket to the International Space Station (ISS). The mission was conducted in collaboration with Jaguar Space and The Karman Project, with launch integration handled by SpaceX through NASA’s Crew-11 mission.

Egusi was selected for its cultural significance in Nigeria and its nutritional properties, with the aim of studying how traditional crops respond to spaceflight conditions such as microgravity and radiation. While aboard the ISS, the seeds were stored under controlled conditions for several days before returning to Earth with the Crew-10 mission. Post-flight analyses are being conducted at the University of Florida and the International Institute of Tropical Agriculture (IITA) in Ibadan to assess germination, molecular stress responses, and viability compared to control samples.

The mission combined cultural heritage, scientific research, and agricultural diplomacy, and received coverage from Nigerian and international media including BBC, Forbes Africa, Channels TV, The Guardian, and TVC News. It marked the first time any agricultural product from West Africa had entered orbit.

== International roles and affiliations ==
In addition to his entrepreneurial and academic work, Oniosun holds several prominent global positions. He is a Research Affiliate at the MIT Media Lab, where he explores the intersection of space technologies, policy, and innovation. He also serves as a Council Member on the World Economic Forum's Global Future Council on Space Technologies, contributing to strategies on the role of space in sustainable development and global cooperation. In 2024, he was appointed a Nonresident Senior Fellow at the Atlantic Council, where he provides expertise on Africa’s emerging space economy and its role in international policy and diplomacy.

Oniosun has significantly influenced international space policy and global cooperation strategies:

- In 2023, he co-authored a special report for the United States Institute of Peace (USIP) and the Center for Strategic and International Studies (CSIS) titled “China’s Space Collaboration with Africa: Implications and Recommendations for the United States”, which analysed geopolitical dynamics and their effects on Africa’s space sector.
- In July 2024, he was featured in the Atlantic Council’s AfricaSource blog, in an article authored by himself, titled “Why the United States needs a robust strategy for space cooperation with Africa”. It emphasized the need for stronger US–Africa space partnerships and highlighted African nations’ commitments through agreements like the Artemis Accords.
- In January 2025, he spearheaded the launch of the €100 million Africa–EU Space Partnership Programme, an initiative by the European Commission under its Global Gateway strategy. The programme was officially unveiled during the NewSpace Africa Conference in Cairo, Egypt, and is set to run until 2028 to enhance institutional capacity, early warning systems, and private-sector engagement across Africa.

== Other activities ==
Oniosun is a YouthMappers fellow, where he led students to create and utilize open data and open source software for geographic information directly related to development objectives in unmapped places of the world where US Agency for International Development (USAID) works to end poverty. In 2017, he led a team to solve the problem of urban waste in Akure, Nigeria. Oniosun currently serves on the inaugural YouthMappers Alumni Council.

He speaks at conferences across the world and regularly appears on various media calling for more government investment in space programs in Africa and leading conversations around the African Space and satellite Industry. He also comments regularly on the African space program on various media.

=== Local development and philanthropy ===
In June 2023, the Temidayo Oniosun Foundation donated a ₦15 million ICT centre to Okaka Grammar School in Oke-Ogun, Oyo State, complete with modern computers and Starlink-powered high-speed internet to bridge the digital divide. The centre serves as a community tech hub, providing training in basic and advanced digital skills to hundreds of local youth. Additionally, the foundation benefits students by covering annual UTME (JAMB) fees, WAEC tuition, and providing scholarships, aiming to ensure youth access to tertiary education through mentorship and financial support.

=== Angel Investing ===
He is an investor in multiple African startups. Since 2021, he has backed founders directly and through an angel syndicate, where he has invested in over 40 early-stage companies focused on solving local challenges with scalable solutions.

== Recognition and honours ==
Oniosun has received widespread recognition for his contributions to Africa's space sector and policy leadership. He has been featured in major international media outlets, including CNN, BBC and CNBC where he is frequently cited for commentary on space technology, policy, and Africa’s growing role in the global space economy.

In 2016, he was the recipient of the International Astronautical Federation Emerging Space Leadership Award for his work in the space industry.

In April 2018, he was featured on BellaNaija's Under 25 series of young Nigerians under 25 who are influencing and disrupting the world of Entrepreneurship, Leadership, Governance and Corporate World. He also received the 35 under 35 space industry recognition award by the International Institute of Space Commerce (IISC).

Also in 2018, he was a recipient of the International Astronautical Federation Emerging Space Leaders Grant Award and was listed in Newspace People 2018/2019 Global Ranking of the top 200 movers and shakers in Newspace.

In June 2020, Oniosun was selected as part of the inaugural Karman Fellowship programme by the Karman Project.

In 2021, Oniosun was listed as one of Forbes Africa's "30 under 30" for his contributions to the space and satellite industry.

He is a regular speaker at high-level conferences and diplomatic events across the world. In April 2024, he was invited to speak at the Meridian Space Diplomacy Forum in Washington, D.C. The panel included representatives from NASA, the U.S. Department of State, and African diplomatic missions.

== See also ==
- International Astronautical Federation
- Space Generation Advisory Council
- Simonetta Di Pippo
- Ruvimbo Samanga
