= Luigi G. Napolitano Award =

The Luigi G. Napolitano Award was an annual award conferred by the International Astronautical Congress (IAC). It was named after Luigi G. Napolitano (1928-1991), an Italian aerospace engineer who helped foster international space science research collaboration on Spacelab and established the European Low Gravity Research Association in 1979.

The award was established in 1993 and presented annually to a young scientist, below 30 years of age, who contributed significantly to the advancement of the aerospace science and had published a paper at the International Astronautical Congress on the contribution. The award was conferred to a total of 30 people, with the last award made in 2022. Beginning in 2023, the IAC established the IAC Young Pioneer Award as the successor to the Napolitano award.

The Luigi G. Napolitano Award was sponsored by the Napolitano family and consisted of the Napolitano commemorative medal and a certificate of citation presented by the Education Committee of the International Astronautical Federation.

The International Academy of Astronautics also awards the Luigi Napolitano Book Award annually.

== List of recipients ==
- 1993: (Japan) Shin-ichi Nishizawa
- 1994: (United Kingdom) Ralph D. Lorenz
- 1995: (Germany) Otfid G. Liepack
- 1996: (China) W. Tang
- 1997: (Netherlands) Guido W. R. Frenken
- 1998: (United States) Michael Donald Ingham
- 1999: (Australia) Chris Blanksby
- 2000: (France) Frederic Monnaie
- 2001: (Japan) Noboru Takeichi
- 2002: (Italy) Stefano Ferreti
- 2003: (Italy) Veronica de Micco
- 2004: (United States) Julie Bellerose
- 2005: (Italy) Nicola Baggio
- 2006: (Italy) Carlo Menon
- 2007: (Australia) Paul Williams
- 2008: (Italy) Giuseppe Del Gaudio
- 2009: (United States) Daniel Kwom
- 2010: (Japan) Andrew Klesh
- 2011: (India) Nishchay Mhatre
- 2012: (Italy) Valerio Carandente
- 2013: (United States) Sreeja Nag
- 2014: (Italy) Alessandro Golkar
- 2015: (Japan) Koki Ho
- 2016: (Italy) Melissa Mirino
- 2017: (United States) Akshata Krishnamurthy
- 2018: (United States) Peter Z. Schulte
- 2019: (China) Hao Chen
- 2020: (United States) Elizabeth Barrios
- 2021: (Italy) Federica Angeletti
- 2022: (United States) Julia Briden

== See also ==
- List of engineering awards
- List of physics awards
- List of space technology awards
