= Ruvimbo Samanga =

Zimbabwean scholar & lawyer (born 1995)

- Education: University of Pretoria
- Occupations: Space Policy Analyst, Legal Researcher and Outreach Coordinator
- Website: ruvimbosamanga.com

Ruvimbo Samanga is a Zimbabwean space policy analyst. Ruvimbo has supported international initiatives in policy, business, outreach, and education geared towards the advancement of space and satellite applications for sustainable development. She previously served a two year term as the National Point of Contact for Zimbabwe in the Space Generation Advisory Council, which is in support of the United Nations Program on Space Applications.

== Early life and education ==
Ruvimbo was born on November 11, 1995 in Bulawayo, Zimbabwe. She completed her primary school education at Whitestone Primary School, and her secondary education at Dominican Convent High School, Bulawayo. She was enthusiastic about arts, culture, and sports and became interested in space as a young girl.

Ruvimbo completed her Bachelor of Arts in Law, her Bachelor of Laws, and her Master of Law in Trade & Investment Law at the University of Pretoria. In support of her studies she received the Ban Ki-Moon Global Citizen Scholarship, the Mandela Washington Fellowship for Young African Leaders, and the Mandela Rhodes Scholarship.

== Career ==
Ruvimbo is a space policy advisor and analyst working with organisations including Space in Africa and the Open Lunar Foundation. She is an advocate for sustainable development through technology, collaboration and the common understanding of our humanness.

In 2018, she was part of the first team from Africa to win the Manfred Lachs Space Law Moot Court competition, where her team addressed planetary defense issues and liability for damages caused in outer space. In 2019, she founded AgriSpace, a company dedicated to helping Zimbabwean farmers optimize crop yields. Recognizing a technological gap due to the reliance on outdated, traditional farming methods, she sought to bridge it, leveraging satellite imagery and data to provide farmers with relevant information. She also helped launch the first space education E-curriculum in Zimbabwe called Astro Zimba.

== Selected publications ==
- Samanga, Ruvimbo (2021). "Remote-Sensing Applications for Mineral Mapping: Boosting Zimbabwe's Foreign Direct Investment Potential Through Sustainable Technology". In Froehlich, Annette (ed.). Space Fostering African Societies. Southern Space Studies. Springer International Publishing. pp. 13–26. doi:10.1007/978-3-030-59158-8_2. ISBN 978-3-030-59157-1.
- Samanga, Ruvimbo (2023-03-24). "Reclaiming Lunar Resources: Paving the Way for An International Property Rights Regime for Outer Space". In Schwartz, James S. J.; Billings, Linda; Nesvold, Erika (eds.). Reclaiming Space. Oxford University Press. pp. 251–263. doi:10.1093/oso/9780197604793.003.0021. ISBN 978-0-19-760479-3.

== Awards ==
- Zimbabwe Achievers Awards – Young Achiever of the Year 2019
- Space in Africa – Top 10 Under 30 in the African Space Industry 2019
- Space Generation Advisory Council – African Space Leaders Award 2020
- International Astronautical Federation – Emerging Space Leaders Award 2021
- International Astronautical Federation – Young Space Leaders Award 2022
- International Institute of Space Law (IISL) – Young Achiever Award 2024

== See also ==
- International Astronautical Federation
- Space Generation Advisory Council
- Simonetta Di Pippo
- Temidayo Isaiah Oniosun
