= Leslie Shepherd =

Leslie Shepherd may refer to:

- Leslie Shepherd (American football), American football player
- Leslie Shepherd (physicist), Welsh nuclear physicist

== See also ==
- Leslie Shepard, British author, archivist, and curator
