= R.V. College of Engineering =

Engineering school in Bangalore, India

Rashtreeya Vidyalaya College of Engineering
- Rāshtrīya Vidyālaya Abhīyāntrīkī Mahāvidyālaya
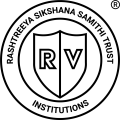
- Motto: Prajvalitō Jñānamaya Pradīpaḥ
- Motto in English: Go, change the world
- Type: Private Engineering College
- Established: 1963; 63 years ago
- Affiliations: Visvesvaraya Technological University
- Principal: Dr. K. N. Subramanya
- Students: 5799 (2021–2022)
- Undergraduates: 4853 (2021–2022)
- Postgraduates: 538 (2021–2022)
- Doctoral students: 408 (2021–2022)
- Location: Mysore Road, Bengaluru, Karnataka, India; 12°55′26.13″N 77°29′58.78″E
- Campus: 16.85 acres (6.82 ha); Urban
- Website: rvce.edu.in
- Located on the Mysore Road in Pattanagere, Bengaluru

Rashtreeya Vidyalaya College of Engineering (RVCE or RV College of Engineering) is an autonomous private engineering college in Bengaluru, Karnataka, India. It was established in 1963 under the Rashtreeya Sikshana Samithi Trust (RSST) and was one of the earliest self-financing engineering colleges in the country. It is affiliated with the Visvesvaraya Technological University, Belagavi. In 2008, the college was given autonomous status.

== Academics ==
=== Academic Programmes ===
RVCE offers courses towards Bachelor of Engineering (B.E), Bachelor of Architecture (BArch), Master of Technology (MTech), Master of Computer Applications (MCA), Master of Architecture (MArch) and Doctor of Philosophy (PhD).

The medium of instruction for all the courses at the college is English.

=== Departments and courses ===
==== Undergraduate ====
These 14 departments offer four-year undergraduate Bachelor of Engineering (BE) courses. All of the undergraduate courses have been conferred autonomous status by the Visvesvaraya Technological University.

- Artificial Intelligence and Machine Learning
- Computer Science & Engineering
- Information Science & Engineering
- Computer Science & Engineering (Data Science)
- Computer Science & Engineering (Cyber Security)
- Electronics & Communication Engineering
- Electrical & Electronics Engineering
- Electronics & Telecommunication Engineering
- Mechanical Engineering
- Aerospace Engineering
- Chemical Engineering
- Civil Engineering
- Biotechnology
- Industrial Engineering & Management
- Electronics & Instrumentation Engineering (not being offered starting academic year 2024 - 2025)

The School of Architecture offers a five-year Bachelor of Architecture (BArch) course which has also been conferred autonomous status by the Visvesvaraya Technological University. The allied departments of the college are the departments of Physics, Chemistry, Mathematics and Humanities along with the placement & training department.

==== Postgraduate ====
Master of Computer Applications (MCA), Master of Technology (MTech) offered by the following departments :

- Computer Science & Engineering
- Information Science & Engineering
- Electronics & Communication Engineering
- Mechanical Engineering

Master of Architecture (MArch) offered by The School of Architecture.

=== Admission ===
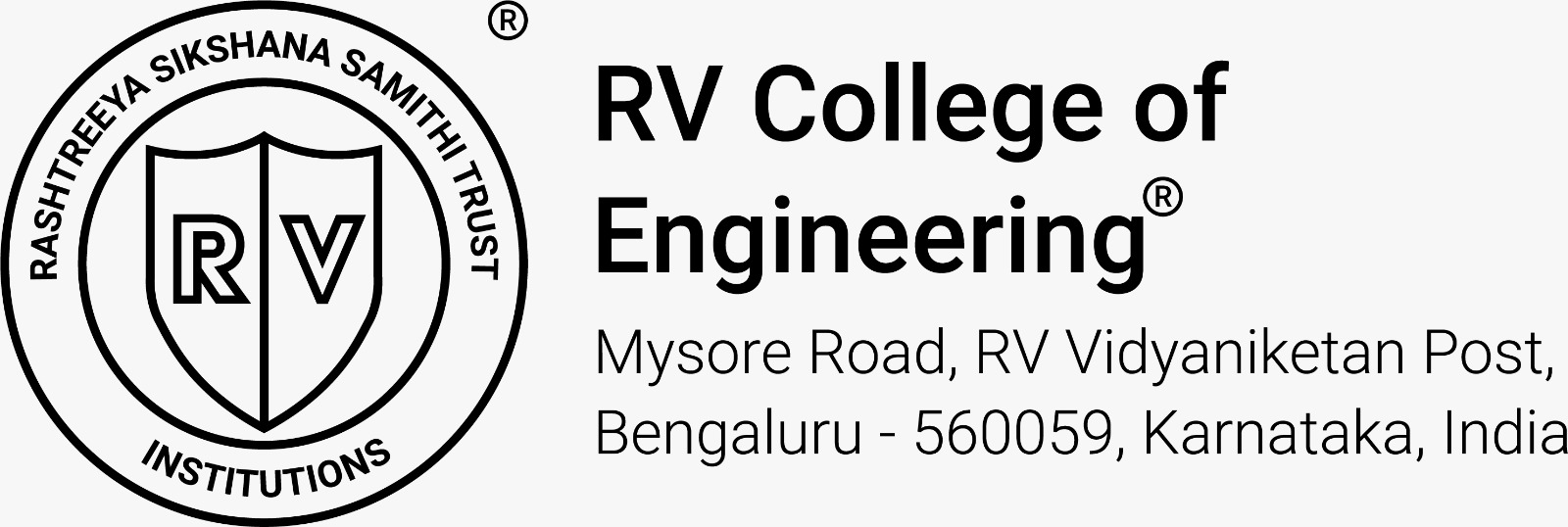
RVCE New logo with address

The admission towards a full-time Bachelor of Engineering degree in RVCE is through either the Karnataka Common Entrance Test or the COMED-K counselling process, based on All India Rank (AIR) secured in the respective entrance examinations.

Admission of foreign students to RVCE is through the direct admission of foreign nationals and non-resident Indians (NRIs) scheme. Admission can also be done by donation through the management quota scheme for which a small amount of seats are reserved. Admission in the BE (Lateral Entry) programme is also available for students with diploma degrees.

Admission towards a postgraduate degree at RVCE is based on performance in the Graduate Aptitude Test in Engineering (GATE) as well as on their Post Graduate Karnataka CET scores qualifying exam scores. If two or more candidates have the same GATE score, the highest percentage in qualifying undergraduate courses shall decide the merit. No separate test or interview is conducted by the college.

=== Achievements and Accreditation ===
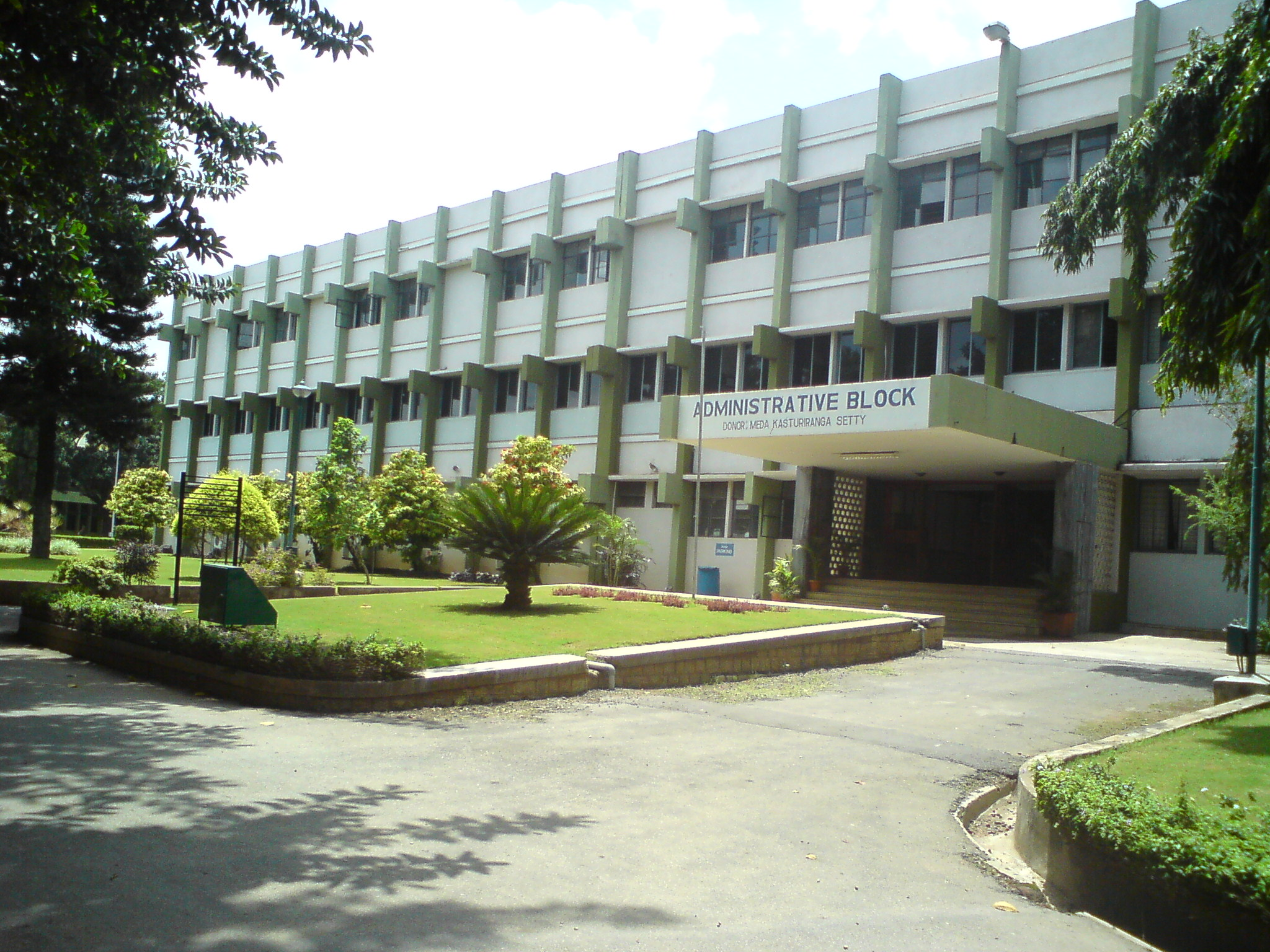
Administrative block

RVCE is accredited as in the Tier 1 category by the National Board of Accreditation, it is also accredited by the All India Council for Technical Education.

It is recognised as a centre of excellence under Technical Education Quality Improvement Program by Government of India.

RVCE has been recognised as a centre for excellence by the Union Government of India.

- In 2008, the college had the highest number of gold medal-winners among colleges affiliated to Visvesvaraya Technological University.
- The department of Mechanical engineering of RVCE is the state's first degree programme in a private institution to be accredited by the National Board of Accreditation.

=== Rankings ===
University rankings

Engineering – India
- NIRF (2022): 89
- NIRF (2023): 96
- NIRF (2024): 99

R.V. College of Engineering was ranked 89 among engineering colleges in India by the National Institutional Ranking Framework (NIRF) in 2022. The college was ranked 96th in 2023 and 99th in 2024.

== Research and Projects ==
The Robotics team from the Instrumentation Technology Department won the "All India Robotics Challenge" at Shaastra 2007 The annual tech fest held at IIT Madras.

Student Space Technology Projects

Team Antariksh is a student satellite team established in 2015 that aims to build a nanosatellite and sounding rocket with a research based payload, guided and monitored by various scientists from the Indian Space Research Organisation Satellite Centre and faculty from RVCE. Started by three aerospace engineering students, as of 2020 the team has a strength of more than 100 students from all fields of engineering. Team Antariksh is a space technology student club whose goal is to understand, disseminate and apply the engineering skills for innovation in the field of aerospace technology. The hundred-member strong team belonging from various engineering backgrounds is involved in designing payload for ISRO's PS4 orbital platform, RVSAT-1 and experimental sounding rocket, ReSOLV-1.The flagship project of the team is RVSAT-1, which is a 2U nanosatellite that is scheduled to be launched in 2022, carrying a microbiological payload.

StudSat is a team of students of RVCE, along with students from some other colleges in the country and the Indian Space Research Organisation, teamed up to make the first pico satellite in India, called StudSat. The pico satellite was launched by the PSLV C-15 on 12 June 2010 from the Satish Dhawan Space Centre in Sriharikota. The camera on board has a low resolution of 90 metres. The panchromatic images are designed to provide terrain information during the satellite's short lifespan of six months to one year.

Society of Automotive Engineers Events

Ashwa Racing is a Formula racing car that won the "Best Car from South Asia" award in the Formula Society of Automotive Engineers event in Germany. The team was also the first Indian team to compete in the FSAE event in 2005 in Australia, which won the "Best Value for Money" award. The project team has been awarded the "Young Achiever 2007" award, an award instituted by the Rotary Midtown and the Brigade Group. Team Vyoma is a student group that designs and manufactures UAVs (Unmanned Aerial Vehicles) to participate in Aerodesign competitions conducted by the Society of Automotive Engineers in Marietta, GA; and in Brazil. The team is the first Asian team to compete in the Aerodesign competitions.

Team Helios Racing is a group of students who designed an All Terrain Vehicle (ATV) that can travel on muddy swamps and climb up hills. The vehicle entered the "Mini BAJA Challenge" — an international challenge in Pretoria in October 2006, and became the national champion at Baja Student India in January 2015.

IEEE branch

The Institute of Electrical and Electronics Engineers (IEEE) operates a student branch in RVCE. It organises many events, some of them being a workshop LabVIEW (Laboratory Virtual Instrumentation Engineering Workbench), which is a platform and development environment for a visual programming language from National Instruments, various paper presentation competitions, and a seminar competition. IEEE PES RVCE chapter was Inaugurated in the year 2015 which organises events pertaining to Electrical Engineering.

ACM Student Chapter

RV College of Engineering also started an ACM Student Chapter in January 2024. They Hosted the ACM India Summit 2024 in collaboration with BMS College of Engineering, Bengaluru

Other projects

Garuda, a fuel-efficient, aerodynamic car, was designed by the Mechanical engineering students. The car reportedly gives a mileage of 180 kilometers per litre of fuel. Project Garuda members were the only team from India to participate in the Shell Eco Marathon held at Rockingham Raceway, Corby, UK. Project Garuda was awarded the 'Most Persevering Team' award, which is given to the best first-time participant every year.

Eight students of the RV College of Engineering developed a vehicle consuming water as a fuel. Together, they have developed a water-powered hybrid auto rickshaw. The team has developed an inexpensive and simple retrofit kit for auto rickshaws.

In June 2008, the students developed a prototype of a hybrid-electric vehicle that uses both electric energy and diesel mixed with bio-diesel. According to The Hindu, this is the first indigenous hybrid-electric prototype in the country and among very few prototypes to use bio-diesel. The project, codenamed 'Chimera', was conceived and the prototype developed by the final year students of four engineering disciplines – Mechanical, Electrical and Computer science and Industrial engineering. From 2019, the college has also housed a center of excellence in Quantum Computing with the help of the student research team called CIRQuIT Quantum Research.

== Notable alumni ==
- Anil Kumble, the former coach and captain of the Indian Cricket Team
- Chetan Baboor, the former international table tennis champion and Arjuna award winner
- Vishwas Mudagal, CEO of GoodWorkLabs and GoodWorks CoWork, Author
- Lakshmi Gopalaswamy, Indian actress and a classical dancer
- Asha Bhat, Miss Supranational 2014 and Bollywood actress
- Vidyut Mohan, social entrepreneur and Earthshot Prize winner
- Divya Gokulnath, the Co-founder and Director of BYJU'S The Learning App
- Nanditha Channarayapatna, playback singer
- Akshata Krishnamurthy, space systems engineer and scientist at the NASA Jet Propulsion Laboratory.
- Shrihari Sridhar, scholar and author

== See also ==
- RV University, Bengaluru
- Visvesvaraya Technological University
- National Institute of Technology Karnataka, Surathkal
- Delhi Technological University
- Indian Institutes of Technology
