= Rashtreeya Sikshana Samithi Trust =

Indian charitable organisation

- Motto in English: Go, change the world
- Type: Educational Trust
- Established: 1940
- Founders: Sri M.C. Sivananda Sarma and Sri Meda Kasturi Ranga Setty
- President: M.P.Shyam
- Location: Bangalore, Karnataka, India
- Website: www.rvinstitutions.com

Rashtreeya Sikshana Samithi Trust (RSST) is a non-profit charitable trust managing Rashtreeya Vidyalaya(RV) Educational Institutions in Bangalore, in the state of Karnataka, India. It was founded in 1940 by M. C. Shivananda Sharma (an educationalist) and Dr Meda Kasturi PanduRanga Shetty (a businessman and philanthropist).The mission of the founder was to ‘Impart Quality Education to all strata of the society’. For the past 80+ years, RV Educational Institutions offering education from kindergarten to higher education to students in streams such as Engineering, Management, Architecture, Medicine & Health Sciences and Teaching. Rashtreeya Sikshana Samithi Trust (RSST) through the RV (Rashtreeya Vidyalaya) institutions are providers of education in the state of Karnataka, India and known globally for imparting quality education in different disciplines. Today, Rashtreeya Sikshana Samithi Trust (RSST) has over 25 institutions across Bangalore, Karnataka constituting more than 20,000 students every year under its umbrella. List of institutes and colleges falling under the umbrella of RV Educational Institutions mentioned below.

== RV Educational Institutions Journey ==
Founded in 1940, RV Institutions have evolved into an educational group in India, primarily located in Bengaluru. Over the years, they have expanded to encompass 21 institutions, including schools, colleges, and specialized centers, catering to over 20,000 students. RV Institutions offer a diverse range of programs, spanning from primary education to professional courses.

University

1. RV University is a Bangalore based state-private university established under the RV University Act 2019 is approved by UGC (University Grants Commission) of India and Karnataka State Government.

Technology Institutions

1. RV College of Engineering
2. RV Institute of Technology and Management
3. RV College of Architecture
4. RV Skills

Management Education Institutions

1. RV Institute of Management (RVIM)
2. MK PANDURANGA SETTY - MKPM RV Institute of Legal Studies
3. RV Training Academy

Health Science Institutions

1. DAPM RV Dental College
2. RV College of Nursing
3. RV College of Physiotherapy

Degree Colleges

1. SSMRV College
2. NMKRV College for Women

Teacher Education Institutions

1. RV Teachers College
2. RV Teachers Training Institute

Pre-University Colleges

1. RV PU College
2. RV PU College South
3. RV PU College North
4. SSMRV PU College
5. NMKRV PU College

Schools

1. RV Public School
2. RV School
3. RV Girls High School

Aster RV Hospital located at J.P.Nagar, Bengaluru, is a super speciality hospital established in collaboration between Rashtreeya Sikshana Samithi Trust (RSST) and Aster Hospitals.

== Philanthropy and Social Responsibility ==
Responding to a request from Bangalore South Member of parliament, Tejasvi Surya, RV Institutions came forward to sponsor and support the degree education of Abhijaya M, son of Late Sri Manjunath Rao, who lost his life in the tragic Pahalgam terror attack on 22 April 2025. He was offered free education, accommodation, and food at RV University.The initiative was presented as part of the RSST commitment to social responsibility and support for families affected by terrorism.
