= Shrihari Sridhar =

American scholar

Shrihari (Hari) Sridhar
- Title: Senior Associate Dean, Mays Business School

Academic background
- Education: B.E. Mechanical Engineering; M.S. Engineering Management; Ph.D. Marketing
- Alma mater: R.V. College of Engineering; University of Missouri

Academic work
- Institutions: Texas A&M University

Shrihari (Hari) Sridhar is an American scholar and author. He serves as senior associate dean of Mays Business School at Texas A&M University, and holds the Joe B. Foster '56 Chair in Business Leadership. He also serves as the editor in chief for the Journal of Marketing. He is known for his work on marketing strategy, the financial impact of marketing investments, and the societal impact of marketing strategies.

== Education ==
Sridhar earned a B.E. in Mechanical Engineering from R.V. College of Engineering in 2002 and then pursued an M.S. in Engineering Management from the University of Missouri–Rolla, graduating in 2004. He completed his Ph.D. in marketing at the University of Missouri–Columbia in 2009.

== Academic career ==
Sridhar held the position of assistant professor of marketing at Michigan State University from 2009 to 2011. He moved to Smeal College of Business Administration at Pennsylvania State University, where he served as an assistant professor of marketing from 2011 to 2016, becoming associate professor of marketing in 2015. From 2014 to 2017, he assumed the role of associate research director at the Institute for the Study of Business Markets and joined Texas A&M's Mays Business School in 2016. While serving as a Center for Executive Development Professor, he concurrently held the position of associate professor of marketing and served as research director for the Reynolds and Reynolds Sales Leadership Institute until 2023.

Sridhar's early career research focused on developing original quantitative approaches to help companies understand the effectiveness of marketing investments. He has constructed original quantitative models aimed at assisting CEOs and board members in eliminating guesswork from strategy formulation, financial planning, and strategy execution.

Later, Sridhar's work was focused on understanding how marketing can have a broader impact on the world, by building quantitative approaches to understand the societal impact of marketing. His research business-to-business/sales, health care, education, media markets, and online/mobile platforms. In his research, he found that increased school district internet access spending (SDIAS) is associated with improved academic performance but also higher disciplinary issues, with variations based on regional household internet access levels. Additionally, his research on semiannual screening for hepatocellular carcinoma revealed that targeted direct-to-patient outreach significantly enhances screening completion rates, leading to substantial returns for healthcare institutions.

Sridhar has served as associate editor and area editor at journals including Journal of Marketing and the Journal of Marketing Research. He has been a finalist for the Marketing Science Institute/H. Paul Root Award, and the Paul Green Award and the Responsible Business Education Award.

Sridhar was recognized with the Rajan Varadarajan Award for Early Career Contributions to Marketing Strategy Research in 2014. He was also chosen as a Marketing Science Institute Young Scholar and Marketing Science Institute Scholar, and an ISBM Distinguished Research Fellow. He holds an appointment as Chancellor's EDGES Fellow and Presidential Impact Fellow at TAMU and has been serving as a Senior Associate Dean as well as Joe B. Foster '56 Chair in Business Leadership and Professor of Marketing since 2023.

Sridhar was listed among the "40 Most Outstanding MBA Professors Under 40" by Poets and Quants in 2018.

== Contributions to the practice of marketing and strategy ==
Sridhar's research has been published in journals and featured in media outlets such as Forbes, Fox News, Harvard Business Review, Houston Chronicle, and Sloan Management Review. He is also a co-author of Marketing Strategy: Based on First Principles and Data Analytics, Market-Based Management: Customer Focus & Profitable Growth and Focus: How to Plan Strategy and Improve Execution to Achieve Growth.

In his 2021 publication Marketing Strategy: Based on First Principles and Data Analytics, Sridhar presented a structured framework that integrated marketing analytics with strategic pillars to tackle various marketing challenges. The second edition of the book introduced updates on digital marketing, influencer strategies, and social media. Additionally, in his book Focus: How to Plan Strategy and Improve Execution to Achieve Growth, co-authored with Vikas Mittal, he addressed strategy challenges encountered by executives, providing insights into formulating and executing strategies with actionable research-based enablers. His collaboration with Roger Best and Vikas Mittal introduced concepts, tools, and strategies in the book Market-Based Management: Customer Focus & Profitable Growth which offered insights into establishing an organizational management system centered around the customer.

Sridhar is chief research officer at Agastya International Foundation.

== Awards and honors ==
- 2014 – Rajan Varadarajan Award, American Marketing Association
- 2018 – Presidential Impact Fellow, Texas A&M University
- 2018 – 40 Most Outstanding MBA Professors Under 40, Poets and Quants
- 2022 – Responsible Business Education Award, Financial Times
- 2023 – AMA-EBSCO-RRBM Award for Responsible Research in Marketing, American Marketing Association
- 2024 – Distinguished Research Fellow, Institute for the Study of Business Markets

== Bibliography ==
=== Selected books ===
- Marketing Strategy: Based on First Principles and Data Analytics (2021) ISBN 978-1352011463
- Focus: How to Plan Strategy and Improve Execution to Achieve Growth (2021) ISBN 978-3030707194
- Market-Based Management: Customer Focus & Profitable Growth (2023) ISBN 979-8385962426
