= RV University =

State-private university located in Bangalore, Karnataka, India

- Motto: Go, change the world
- Type: Private University
- Established: 2021
- Affiliations: UGC; KSHEC
- Chancellor: Dr. A. V. S. Murthy
- Vice-Chancellor: Ram Kumar Kakani
- Location: Bengaluru, Karnataka, India; 12°55′24″N 77°29′59″E
- Campus: Campus 1 (Bengaluru): Next to Pattanagere Metro Station Campus 2 (Mysuru): KIADB Industrial Area, Nanjangud
- Website: RV University – Bengaluru Campus; RV University – Mysuru Campus

RV University is a Karnataka state recognized private university for liberal education based in Bengaluru and Mysuru, Karnataka, India. It was established by the Rashtreeya Sikshana Samithi Trust (RSST), which has over eight decades of experience in higher education system.

== History ==
RV University, which commenced operations in 2021, is governed by the Rashtreeya Sikshana Samithi Trust (RSST) which is a charitable trust managing RV Educational Institutions in Bengaluru, Karnataka, India. Today, RSST has over 21 institutions across Bengaluru constituting more than 20,000 students every year under its umbrella. RV University is an initiative of the RSST which also manages the engineering institution RV College of Engineering in Bangalore.

== Accreditation & Recognition ==
- RV University is a state-private university established in Bengaluru under the RV University Act 2019, which was passed by the Karnataka Legislative Assembly.It is approved by the Government of Karnataka, India and offers various undergraduate and postgraduate programs.
- RV University has received all regulatory approvals by the University Grants Commission (UGC), India.
- RV University is granted affiliation by the Bar Council of India (BCI), recognizing its law programs as per the prescribed standards and regulations.
- As of 2026, RV University is classified with H +/- status in the Anabin database, indicating that its recognition in the German higher education system is conditional or limited to specific programs. This status typically precludes the issuance of a mandatory APS certificate, effectively limiting direct eligibility for postgraduate studies at most German universities unless the specific degree program is explicitly recognized as equivalent.

== Rankings ==
- In 2024, RV University secured the 2nd rank among the top 10 Emerging State Private Universities in India, according to Outlook's rankings based on multiple parameters.
- In 2025, RV University secured the 1st rank among the top 10 Emerging State Private Universities in India, according to Outlook's rankings based on multiple parameters.

== Academic Schools - Bengaluru Campus ==
RV University (RVU), Bengaluru offers undergraduate, postgraduate and PhD programmes in different academic disciplines namely,

- School of Allied and Healthcare Professions
- School of Business
- School of Computer Science and Engineering
- School for Continuing Education and Professional Studies
- School of Design and Innovation
- School of Economics and Public Policy
- School of Film, Media and Creative Arts
- School of Law
- School of Liberal Arts and Sciences

== Academic Schools - Mysuru Campus ==
RV University (RVU), Mysuru offers undergraduate and postgraduate programmes in different academic disciplines namely,

- School of Engineering (SoE)
- School of Management
- School of Pure and Applied Sciences
- School of Psychology and Behavioural Sciences
- School of Pharmacy

== Academic Programmes - Bengaluru Campus ==
Undergraduate Education: BTech, BDes, BSc, BCA, BA, BBA, BCom, BA LLB, BBA LLB – all offered with Honours and various specialization subjects.

Postgraduate Education: MTech (CSE), MDes, MBA, MCom, MSc, MA, LLM, PhD – all offered with various specialization subjects.

== Academic Programmes - Mysuru Campus ==
Undergraduate Education: BTech(Hons) Computer Science & Engineering, BTech(Hons) Electronics & Communication, B.Sc. (Hons) Computer Science, BCA (Hons), BCA (Hons) AIML, BCA (Hons) Data Science, BBA (Hons), BBA (Hons) Logistics, Port & Supply Chain Management, BBA (Hons) Business Analytics & Entrepreneurship, B.Com. (Hons) Regular (Finance, Taxation & Auditing), B.Com. (Hons) ACCA, B.Sc. (Hons) Chemistry with major in Polymer & Pharmaceutical, B.Sc. (Hons) Physics with major in Astro Physics & Quantum Technology, B.Sc. (Hons) Life Sciences with major in BioInformatics, Molecular Biotechnology, B.Sc. (Hons) Food Technology (Major Dietics & Nutrition), B.Sc. (Hons) Computational Mathematics, B.Sc. (Hons) Psychology, B.Pharma

Postgraduate Education: MCA, M.Sc. in Chemistry with major in Polymer & Pharmaceutical, M.Sc. in Astro Physics & Quantum Technology, M.Sc in Life Sciences BioInformatics, Molecular Biotechnology

== Admissions ==
RVU offers over 35 specialized undergraduate and postgraduate courses across multiple schools.RVU admits students based on RVU Selection Process for all UG, PG and PhD Programmes of RV University. RVU admits 40% of undergraduate engineering (Bachelor of Technology) students based on their Karnataka CET ranks. Also RVU admits students under a management quota.

Schools and Departments	BTech Students
RVU School of Computer Science and Engineering (SoCSE); Department of Computer Science and Engineering	540 Per Year

RVU School of Design and Innovation offers a Bachelor of Design (B.Des.) (Hons.) program and allocates some seats for admission through the Undergraduate Common Entrance Examination for Design (UCEED). However, the RVU is not part of the Joint Admission Process conducted by IIT Bombay, and candidates must apply directly through RV University's admission process.

== Collaborations ==
RV University collaborates with various universities, institutes, and companies both in India and worldwide, including:

- RV University has partnered with Arizona State University (ASU), enabling RVU students to pursue a variety of undergraduate and master’s degrees in key disciplines such as Computer Science and Engineering, Business, Management, Design, and Liberal Arts.
- RV University has signed a Memorandum of Understanding (MoU) with Bryant University, Seattle University, Old Dominion University in the US, Teesside University in UK and Ziroh Labs for academic and research collaboration.
- RV University signed a MoU with Asia’s largest integrated higher Edtech platform, upGrad to offer a joint M.Tech programme in data science.
- RV University signed a MoU with Dhurakij Pundit University, Thailand to enhancing educational opportunities and fostering a stronger global academic network.
- NSE Academy Limited (NAD), a wholly owned subsidiary of the National Stock Exchange of India (NSE) has signed an agreement with RV University for a Post Graduate Certification Program in Global Financial Markets.
- RV University (RVU) and the Institute of Chartered Accountants of India (ICAI), a statutory body set up under an Act of Parliament, have entered into an MoU to build a strategic alliance for boosting education and research initiatives.
- RV University (RVU) partnership with Hombale Films is poised to transform the landscape of undergraduate and postgraduate education in film, media, OTT and creative arts under academic discipline School Of Film, Media And Creative Arts .
- RV University has joined with Ibaraki Prefecture, Japan has signed a mutual cooperation agreement provides for training and placement of Indian students in Japan.A Joint Statement to this effect has been signed by Kazuhiko Ōigawa, Governor of Ibaraki Prefecture, Japan and Prof. (Dr.) Y.S.R. Murthy, Vice Chancellor, RVU in the presence of Dr. (h.c.) A.V.S. Murthy, Chancellor, RVU and Tsutomu Nakane, Consul General of Japan in Bengaluru.

== Scholarships ==
The RV university has allocated Rs 10 crore for merit scholarships for the ensuing academic year starting in August 2023. This will benefit 500 students pursuing undergraduate and postgraduate degree programmes.

== Hostel accommodation ==
RV University provides separate hostels for boys and girls, ensuring a safe and comfortable stay for all undergraduate and postgraduate students. The hostels are equipped with facilities such as Wi-Fi, a gym, sports amenities, and a dining mess for all residents. Accommodation is allotted based on the students’ year of study, with senior students receiving increased privacy and comfort.

== Campuses ==
=== Bengaluru Campus ===
RV University's campus is located within the R.V. College of Engineering campus, which provides various shared facilities and amenities for its students. Spread across 50 acres, RV University’s infrastructure is designed to provide a comprehensive and enriching educational experience.

RV University's library, spanning 60,000 square feet across four floors, integrates digital and physical resources to support a broad range of academic disciplines. Its modern design includes research labs, maker spaces, individual and group study pods, an amphitheater, and interactive reading areas.

Additionally, it offers an extensive digital repository with access to leading academic databases such as EBSCO, JSTOR, and IEEE, along with e-books, journals, and multimedia resources .

There is also a nearby metro station called Pattanagere, located at the university gate on the purple line in Bangalore.

=== Mysuru Campus ===
RV University announced the launch of its new 42-acre campus in Mysuru, Karnataka in 2026 with different foundational schools.

The campus includes smart and ICT-enabled classrooms, laboratories, an auditorium with a seating capacity of 1,600, a swimming pool, a gymnasium, and an amphitheatre. It also features residential facilities and a green campus environment.

Sports infrastructure at the campus includes a cricket ground, basketball and volleyball courts, squash facilities, and provisions for archery, shooting, Kho-Kho, and Kabaddi.

== See also ==
- List of educational institutions in Bangalore
- National Institute of Technology Karnataka, Surathkal.
- R.V.College of Engineering, Bengaluru.
- B.M.S. College of Engineering, Bengaluru.
- PES University, Bengaluru.
- Ramaiah Institute of Technology, Bengaluru.
