= Marcel Barrère =

French aerospace engineer

Chevalier Marcel Barrère
- Born: Marcel Louis Joseph Barrère; August 19, 1920; Saint-Lys, France
- Died: August 25, 1996 (aged 76); Saint-Tropez, France
- Spouse: Simone Barrère
- Awards: Legion of Honour; Ordre national du Mérite; Ordre des Palmes académiques

Academic background
- Education: University of Toulouse (BS); Centre Supérieur de Mécanique de Paris (PhD)

Academic work
- Institutions: ONERA
- Main interests: Rocket propulsion; combustion; hypersonics; solid propellants; renewable energy

Marcel Louis Joseph Barrère (/bærˈɛr/; ba-RAIR; 19 August 1920 – 25 August 1996) was a French aerospace engineer and combustion scientist. He spent five decades at the Office National d'Études et de Recherches Aérospatiales (ONERA) as director of research and is regarded as one of the founding figures of European rocket propulsion science.

Barrère served as president of the International Astronautical Federation from 1977 to 1978 and was elected a member of the French Academy of Sciences, a foreign associate of the National Academy of Engineering, and knight of the Legion of Honour.

== Early life and education ==
Barrère was born on 19 August 1920 in Saint-Lys, a small commune southwest of Toulouse in the Haute-Garonne department of southern France. He obtained his first university degree from the University of Toulouse in 1942, graduating during the German occupation of France. He subsequently moved to Paris to pursue postgraduate study, earning his doctorate from the Centre Supérieur de Mécanique de Paris in 1951, with research focused on combustion and propulsion phenomena.

== Career ==
After graduating, Barrère joined ONERA in 1944, shortly before the end of World War II, and remained at the organization for the rest of his life. He served successively as research engineer (1944–1954), head of a research group (1954–1958), chief of the Chemical Propulsion Division (1958–1970), coordinator for propulsion systems (1970–1972), head of the Energetics Department (1972–1979), director of research (1979–1985), and subsequently as senior advisor until his death.

In the mid-1950s, alongside colleague Moutet, Barrère initiated ONERA's intensive research programme on hybrid propulsion, known as the Lithergol Expérimental (LEX) program, which led to the launch of the first European hybrid rocket in 1964. Among his European collaborators was Italian fluid dynamicist Luigi G. Napolitano, with whom he worked during the 1960s on problems of boundary layers and hypersonic flight. He also published books on rocket propulsion with Belgian colleagues André Jaumotte, Baoudouin Fraeijs de Veubeke, and Jean A. Vandenkerckhove.

Barrère lectured on combustion and rocket propulsion at the École Nationale Supérieure de l'Aéronautique from 1958 to 1970, and on the same subject — renamed aerothermochemistry by Theodore von Kármán — at the École Nationale des Mines de Paris from 1965 to 1974. He also held teaching appointments in thermoeconomy at the Institut national polytechnique de Toulouse (1970–1975), and in combustion and transport phenomena at the Université libre de Bruxelles (1960–1985), as well as an academic title at the École Polytechnique in Paris from 1970 to 1984.

He gained international prominence in the early 1950s through his appearances at the NATO Advisory Group for Aeronautical Research and Development (AGARD) Combustion and Propulsion Panel, formed under the direction of Theodore von Kármán. He served as vice-president of the International Academy of Astronautics and president of the International Astronautical Federation from 1977 to 1978, as well as chairman of the French Section of the International Combustion Institute. He also served as president of both a solar energy laboratory and a wind energy committee, reflecting his growing interest in renewable energy during the final decade of his career.

Barrère died of a heart attack on 25 August 1996 at his vacation residence in Saint-Tropez, France, aged 76.

== Personal life ==
He married Simone Barrère, who became a companion and scientific collaborator. The couple had one daughter, Hélène, who predeceased them. Marcel and Simone subsequently raised Hélène's two sons.

== Awards ==
- Plumey Prize of the French Academy of Sciences (1960)
- Prix Paul Doistau–Émile Blutet (1975)
- Member of the French Academy of Sciences (1978)
- Foreign member of the National Academy of Engineering
- Medal of the Free University of Brussels
- Knight of the French Legion of Honour
- Officer in the French National Order of Merit
- Officer in the Order of Academic Palms

== Books ==
- Rocket Propulsion (1960–1962); Barrère, Jaumotte, de Veubeke, and Vandenkerckhove; Elsevier.
- Fundamental Aspects of Solid Propellant Rockets (1967); Marcel Barrère, Forman A. Williams, and N. C. Huang; AGARD.
- Chemical Reactivity in Liquids: Fundamental Aspects; Chapter 2: The Importance of the Second Law of Thermodynamics in Chemical Engineering (1988); Springer ISBN 978-0-306-42922-4
