= ASTERIA (spacecraft) =

CubeSat testing technologies for the detection of exoplanets

ASTERIA (Arcsecond Space Telescope Enabling Research in Astrophysics)
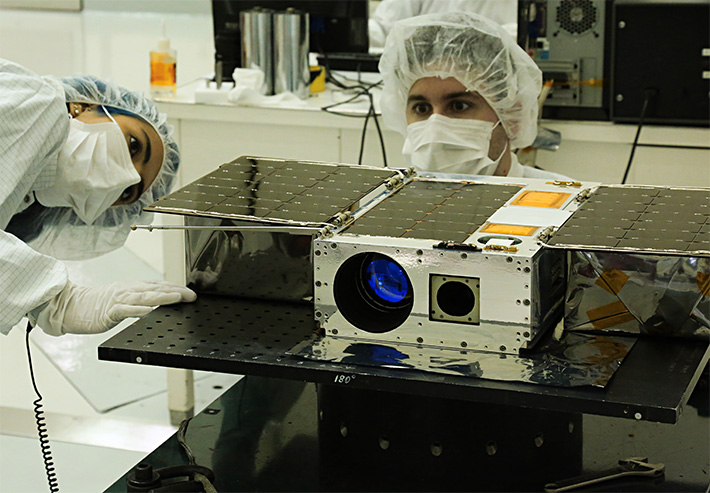
- ASTERIA during testing. It is a 6U CubeSat space telescope for the detection of exoplanets
- Names: ExoplanetSat (2011)
- Mission type: Technology demonstrator
- Operator: NASA
- COSPAR ID: 1998-067NH
- SATCAT no.: 43020
- Website: www.jpl.nasa.gov/cubesat/missions/asteria.php
- Mission duration: Nominal: 90 days Extension: up to 1 year Achieved: 2 years, 15 days

Spacecraft properties
- Spacecraft: ASTERIA
- Bus: 6U CubeSat
- Manufacturer: JPL and MIT
- Launch mass: 12 kg (26 lb)
- Dimensions: 10 cm × 20 cm × 30 cm (0.33 ft × 0.66 ft × 0.98 ft)

Start of mission
- Launch date: August 14, 2017, 16:31 UTC deployed: 20 November 2017
- Rocket: Falcon 9
- Launch site: Kennedy LC-39A
- Contractor: SpaceX

End of mission
- Last contact: 5 December 2019
- Decay date: 24 April 2020

Orbital parameters
- Reference system: Geocentric
- Regime: Low Earth
- Perigee altitude: 402.7 kilometres (250.2 miles)
- Apogee altitude: 406.7 kilometres (252.7 miles)
- Inclination: 51.6°
- Period: 92.5 minutes

Main telescope
- Wavelengths: visible spectrum: 390–700 nm

ASTERIA (Arcsecond Space Telescope Enabling Research In Astrophysics) was a miniaturized space telescope technology demonstration and opportunistic science mission to conduct astrophysical measurements using a CubeSat. It was designed in collaboration between the Massachusetts Institute of Technology (MIT) and NASA's Jet Propulsion Laboratory. ASTERIA was the first JPL-built CubeSat to have been successfully operated in space. Originally envisioned as a project for training early career scientists and engineers, ASTERIA's technical goal was to achieve arcsecond-level line-of-sight pointing error and highly stable focal plane temperature control. These technologies are important for precision photometry, i.e., the measurement of stellar brightness over time. Precision photometry, in turn, provides a way to study stellar activity, transiting exoplanets, and other astrophysical phenomena.

ASTERIA was launched on 14 August 2017 and deployed into low Earth orbit from the International Space Station on 20 November 2017. The primary mission lasted 90 days, but the satellite continued operations for 745 days through three extended missions until last successful communications were made on 5 December 2019. The satellite decayed on 24 April 2020. The Principal Investigator was Canadian-American astronomer and planetary scientist Sara Seager, from the Massachusetts Institute of Technology.

== Overview ==
The Arcsecond Space Telescope Enabling Research in Astrophysics (ASTERIA) was a six-unit (6U) CubeSat space telescope deployed from the International Space Station (ISS) with the goal of testing new technologies for the detection of exoplanets using the transit method. The program was funded at JPL through the Phaeton Program for training early career employees. Its target mission lasted for 90 days, after which it was extended until the loss of contact with the spacecraft.

ASTERIA's capabilities enabled precision photometry to be performed on an opportunistic basis to study stellar activity, transiting exoplanets, and other astrophysical phenomena. The technological objectives of the mission were "to achieve arcsecond-level line of sight pointing error, and highly stable focal plane temperature control for precision photometry" as a way to detect transiting exoplanets, and characterize their host stars. The pointing stability was demonstrated over 20-minute observations. Pointing repeatability would be determined over a minimum of five observations over eight or more days, with the target star being returned to the same position on the focal plane by adjusting the spacecraft orientation and focal plane position.

This mission may serve as a pathfinder for a fleet of low-cost space telescopes observing multiple targets at once to refine long-term mission goals by identifying new objects for other telescopes to observe. The miniaturization of a photometric detection system into a CubeSat could enable a constellation of multiple orbiting observatories for a continuous study of the brightest Sun-like stars which is not possible by conventional space observatories given their cost. Having one or more CubeSats pointed at a target star for extended duration could reveal long-transiting exoplanets. This mission also provided additional information in the design of future space telescopes.

== Launch ==
ASTERIA was launched on board a SpaceX Falcon-9 rocket (mission SpaceX CRS-12) on 14 August 2017 and it was deployed to low Earth orbit from the International Space Station in November 2017. A crew member in the ISS transferred the satellite from the cargo vehicle to the Japanese Experiment Module (JEM) airlock for transfer outside the ISS.

== Design ==
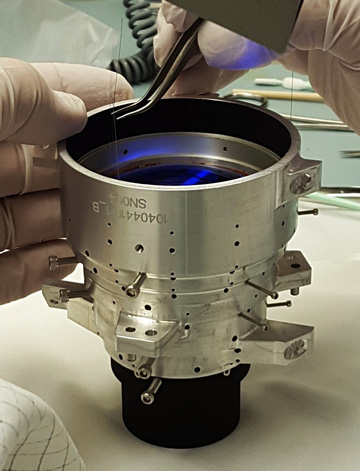
Lens alignment

The ASTERIA concept was a follow-on to the proposed 3U CubeSat mission called ExoplanetSat that was designed in the early 2010s. The ASTERIA telescope is a 6U CubeSat measuring 10 × 20 × 30 cm, and has a mass of 12 kg (26 lb). Power was supplied by deployable fixed solar panels and rechargeable batteries.

Commercial reaction wheels provided coarse orientation (attitude control), while fine pointing control was achieved by tracking a set of guide stars on the active pixel sensor (CMOS) and moving the piezoelectric positioning stage to compensate for residual pointing errors. The goal was to maintain the target star image to within a fraction of a detector pixel over long durations, with a pointing accuracy better than 60 arcsecond, and optimally as precise as 5 arcsecond over a period of 20 minutes. The gain of each pixel was temperature sensitive, so the second objective of ASTERIA was to demonstrate milliKelvin-level (1 mK = 10^{−3} K) temperature stability of the imaging detector.

ASTERIA demonstrated the ability to collect photometric data, and process photometric light curves from a CubeSat. Secondary applications included measuring stellar rotation periods, characterizing stellar activity of exoplanet hosts, and supporting ground-based radial velocity measurements with simultaneous photometry. After the success of its 90-day planned mission, ASTERIA's extended mission targeted bright stars (luminosity Vmag < 8) with known low-mass planets discovered by the radial velocity method, that are not yet known to transit.

=== Scientific payload ===
The telescope payload consisted of a lens and baffle assembly, a CMOS imager, and a two-axis piezoelectric positioning stage on which the focal plane was mounted. The optics section was composed of an f/1.4 85 mm Zeiss lens with a 28.6-degree field of view and six elements, focusing an image 43 mm in diameter onto the focal plane. The focal plane array housed two active detector areas – one larger CMOS detector that fulfilled the science function, and a smaller CMOS sensor to acted as a rapid-cadence star camera to provide orientation data to the attitude control system.

In April 2018, NASA's JPL reported that ASTERIA "has accomplished all of its primary mission objectives, demonstrating that the miniaturized technologies on board can operate in space as expected."
