= Leslie Shepherd (physicist) =

British physicist (1918–2012)

- Born: 23 November 1918; Pontycymmer, Wales
- Died: 18 February 2012 (aged 93); London
- Education: University College, London; St Catharine's College, Cambridge
- Known for: Dragon reactor
- Scientific career
- Workplaces: Mond Laboratory; Atomic Energy Research Establishment
- Thesis: Magnetic Spectrometer Studies on Radioactive Isotopes (1948)

Leslie Robert Shepherd (23 November 1918 – 18 February 2012) was a Welsh nuclear physicist. He was involved in the design and operation of the experimental Dragon reactor, which used helium as a coolant. He was also an advocate of space exploration, serving as the president of the British Interplanetary Society and the International Astronautical Federation.

== Early life ==
Leslie Robert Shepherd was born on 23 November 1918, in Pontycymmer, Wales, where his father, William Shepherd, was a station master. Although his family moved to London when he was a teenager, he retained a Welsh accent. When he was six years old he suffered an infection that left him deaf in his left ear. He entered University College, London, where he studied physics. On the outbreak of the Second World War he drafted into the British Army, serving in the Royal Corps of Signals, but was allowed to return to University College to complete his degree. He graduated in 1940 with a BSc with first-class honours.

During the war he worked at the Mond Laboratory at the University of Cambridge, where he was engaged in testing electronic fuses for naval guns. After the war ended Sir Arthur Vick persuaded him to remain at Cambridge and pursue postgraduate studies at St Catharine's College, Cambridge. He married Elsie Lodge in 1947; they had one son. He completed his PhD in 1948, writing his thesis on "Magnetic Spectrometer Studies on Radioactive Isotopes".

== Nuclear reactors ==
In 1948, Shepherd joined the Atomic Energy Research Establishment at Harwell, Oxfordshire. In 1956, he was deputy head of the group that developed the Dragon reactor, an experimental high temperature gas-cooled reactor that investigated the use of helium as a coolant. Construction commenced in 1959 at Winfrith in Dorset, and the reactor became operational in 1965. In addition to the use of helium, Dragon incorporated many groundbreaking technologies. Efficiency was improved by omitting the metal cladding on the fuel elements, with the idea that gaseous fission products could be removed with filters. It was found that most were retained within the fuel elements, resulting in the development of a new coating for fuel pellets. It also investigated the thorium fuel cycle, which held great promise.

Shepherd became the chief executive of the project three years later, and remained in the job until the project was cancelled in 1975. This came as a grave disappointment to Shepherd, who was convinced of the safety, efficiency and commercial viability of the helium-cooled reactor design. After a sabbatical in the United States, Shepherd returned to Winfrith in 1978, and remained there until he retired in 1983.

== Space travel ==
Shepherd joined the British Interplanetary Society, a space advocacy organisation, in 1935, but had little involvement with it before the war. However, he was present at its first meeting after the war ended in 1945, and became a member of its governing council and its technical director in 1946. In 1950, he helped found the International Astronautical Federation (IAF), and organised its second annual conference in London in 1951. He served as its president from 1956 to 1957, and stepped in again in 1962 following the death of the IAF's president, the French mathematician Joseph Pérès. He succeeded the science fiction writer Arthur C. Clarke as the chairman of the British Interplanetary Society in 1953 and later served as chairman and president from 1957 to 1960, and 1966 to 1967. He also became one of the founding members of the International Academy of Astronautics in 1959.

Unaware of primitive earlier secret research carried out in the United States on nuclear rocket propulsion since 1946, Shepherd teamed up with British rocket scientist Val Cleaver to produce a series of groundbreaking scientific papers published in the Journal of the British Interplanetary Society in 1948 and 1949, that considered how nuclear technology might be applied to interplanetary travel. The papers examined both nuclear-thermal and nuclear-electric propulsion, methods that were subsequently proved to be practical. Shepherd followed this with a 1952 paper on interstellar travel, the first scientific treatment of the problem. Here, the distances involved were orders of magnitude greater. Shepherd considered nuclear propulsion based on nuclear fission, nuclear fusion and antimatter. The existence of antimatter had been theorised by Paul Dirac, and the positron had been discovered in 1932, but the antiproton was not discovered until 1955 by Emilio Segrè, and in 1952 many scientists doubted its existence. Shepherd noted that the effects of time dilation meant that interstellar voyages requiring centuries of travel could still be conducted in a human lifespan if sufficiently high speeds could be generated. He continued publishing papers on nuclear rocket technology, including one with Giovanni Vulpetti, into the 1990s.

== Personal life ==
Shepherd's wife died in 1979, and in 1981 he married Ruth Margaret Howard, a co-worker at Winfrith. He died on 18 February 2012.
