= Massimo Trella =

Italian engineer

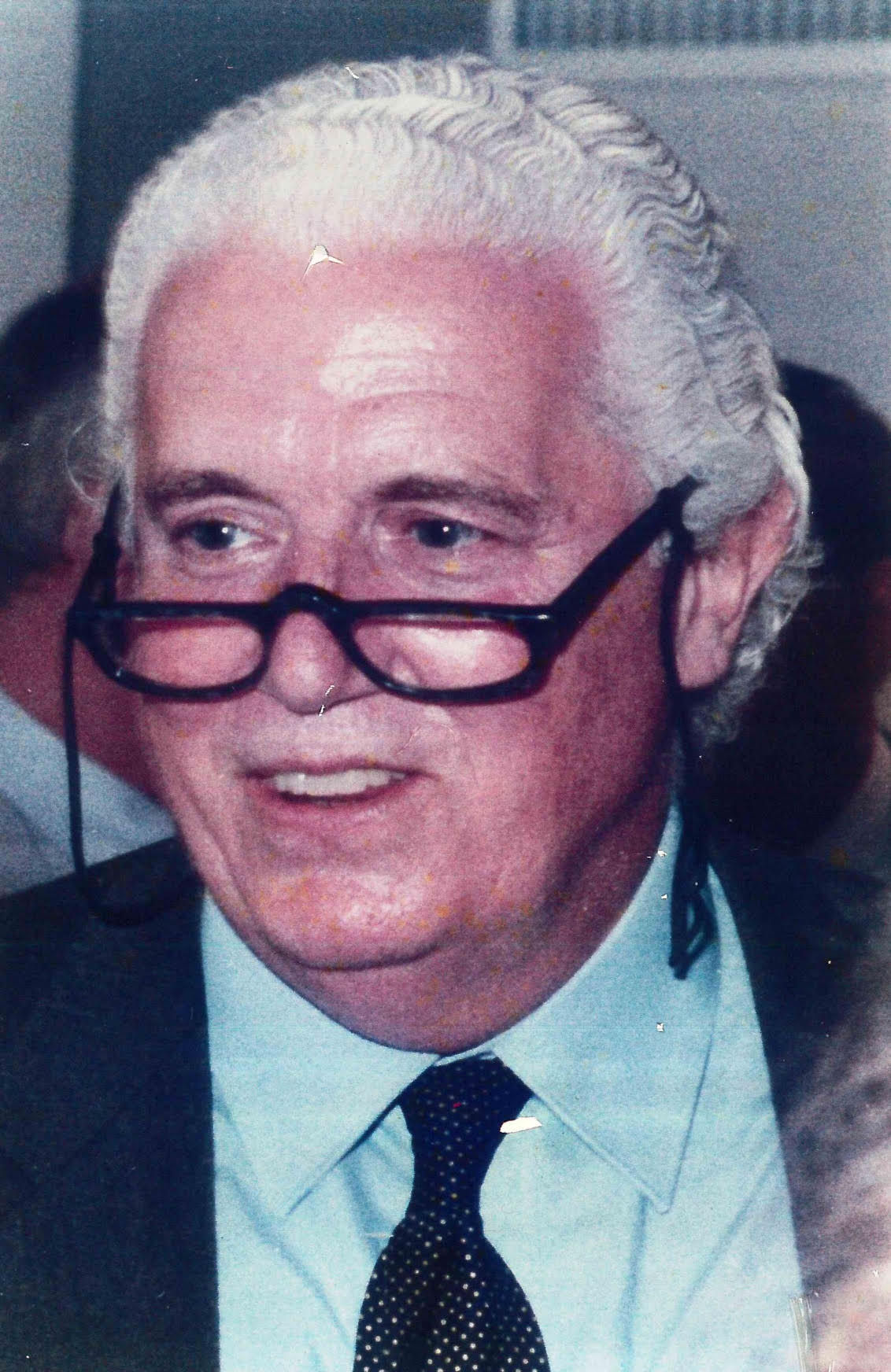
- Born: April 2, 1932; Rome, Italy
- Died: October 15, 2002 (aged 70); Rome, Italy
- Education: Master degree, Mechanical and Aerospace Engineering
- Alma mater: University of Rome La Sapienza
- Occupation: Engineer
- Spouse: Anna Mazzarini (m. 1959)
- Children: 2 daughters
- Parent(s): Serafino and Amalia De Rosa

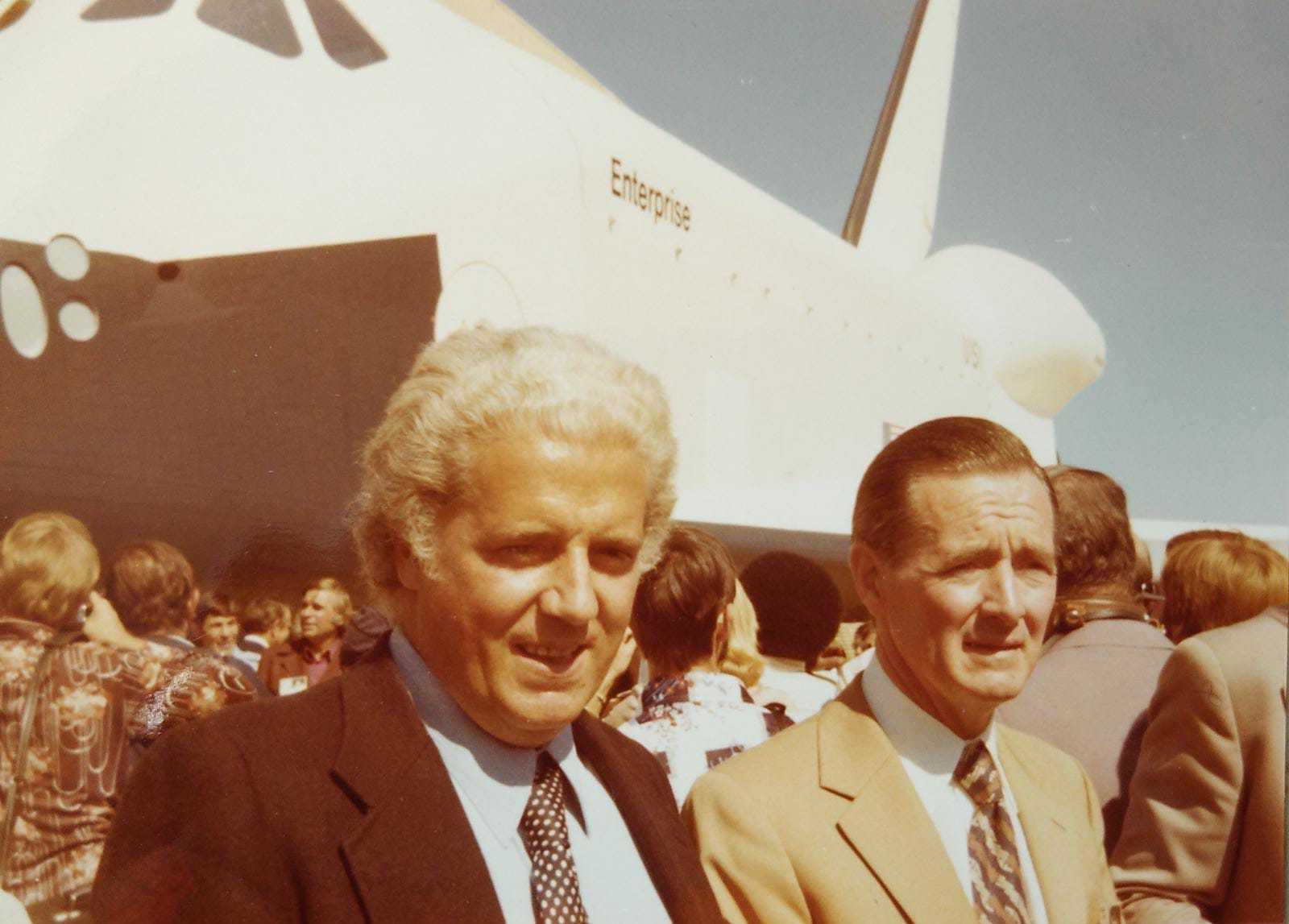
Prof M. Trella with Roy Gibson (general director of ESA) at Palmdale on 1976. In the background the Enterprise.

Massimo Trella (Rome, April 2, 1932 – Rome, October 15, 2002) was an Italian engineer, with a Master degree in mechanical and aerospace engineering, who has held numerous prestigious institutional positions in Italy and abroad in the space exploration field. He was a member of ASI (Italian Space Agency), director of ESTEC and Inspector General of ESA.

== Biographical notes ==
Massimo Trella was born in Rome on April 2, 1932 from Serafino and Amalia De Rosa (recognized in 2011 among the Righteous Among The Nations). Second child after Giustino (1930) and before Chiara (1934), he led his childhood in Rome in the Coppedé district.

He graduated from the Liceo Classico T. Tasso in 1950 and then enrolled at the University of Rome La Sapienza, Faculty of Engineering, graduating in 1956 first in Mechanics (108/110) and then in 1958 the cum Laude degree in Aeronautical Engineering at the Aerospace Engineering School. After his academic studies he did his military service at the Aeronautical Engineers (GARI) as a second lieutenant.

He married Anna Mazzarini on November 28, 1959, by whom he had two daughters, Cristina (1960) and Susanna (1963).

== Teaching and research activity ==
M. Trella soon after graduating became an assistant professor in the Department of Mechanical and Aeronautical Engineering. Later he left for the United States in the early 1960s at the request of prof. Antonio Ferri of the Polytechnic Institute of Brooklyn, Freeport N.Y as assistant professor and then associate professor in the Aeronautics & Applied Mechanics department. The institute housed a major aerospace research laboratory built with the support of the NASA. In parallel with his teaching he did research studies and publications in the field of hypersonic flows of real gases, reentry configurations, thermal protection systems, mechanics of the flight of satellites.

In 1964 he returned to Italy starting a collaboration at the La Sapienza University of Rome, obtaining the free teaching in Aerodynamics in 1965. From this moment he became full professor for the courses of Aerology and Rarefied Gas Dynamics at the School of Aerospace Engineering in Rome.

In the same year 1964 he was hired by the CNR of Rome as Chief Researcher, becoming director of the Space Activities Service (SAS) in 1971, a position he held until 1973. During the period of work at the CNR he devoted himself to the SIRIO project, the first satellite of Italian communication, with the aim of promoting and coordinating the participation of Italian companies and institutions in the related cooperation programs. In parallel with his research and teaching activities, M. Trella worked as a consultant in the aerospace field for the Minister of Scientific Research Camillo Ripamonti.

== Career at the Space Agencies ==
In 1965 M. Trella began his activity as a technical member of the Italian delegation in various international programs. He was appointed vice president of the Technical Planning Staff (TPS) at the CETS (European Conference of Satellite Communication) in London, and later Italian Delegate to the boards of the Space Societies ELDO (European Launcher Development Organization), ESRO (European Space Research Organization) and CSE (European Space Conference) and by the latter he was entrusted with the first exploratory survey for a US-Europe cooperation after the Apollo program.

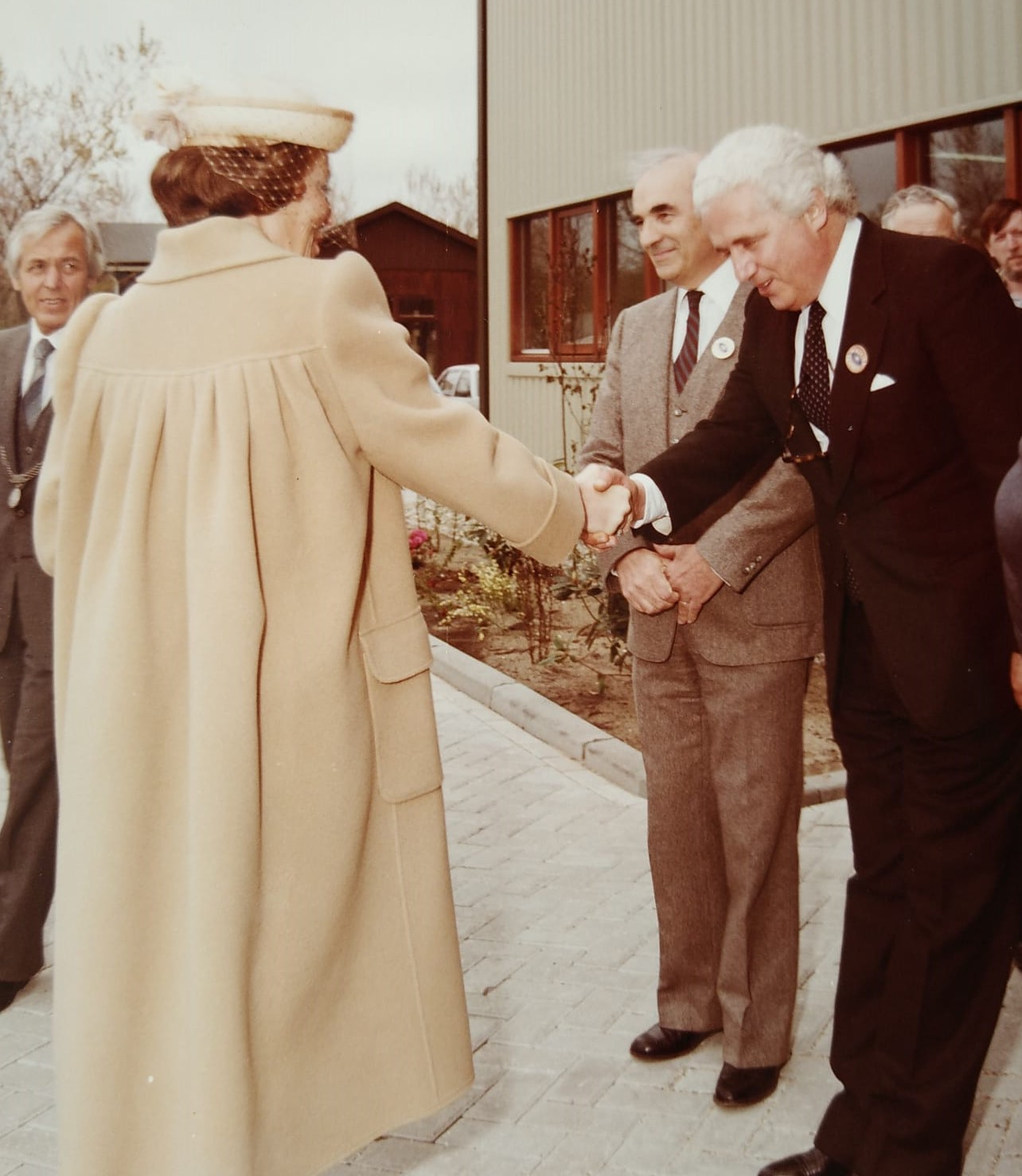
Visit of the Queen of Nederlands by ESTEC on 1984

From 1969 he was appointed consultant for the Italian Minister of Scientific Research and secretary of the CIAs (Interministerial Committee for Space Activities) and joined the study committee on the aeronautical industry at the Ministry of Economy for the definition of the government plan of economic investments.

In 1973 he was elected vice president of ESRO and president of the Spacelab Program Committee.

In January 1975 he was appointed technical inspector of the newly established European Space Agency (ESA) based in Paris and in July 1978 technical director of ESTEC in Noordwijk (Netherlands). He will hold this role until 1998 to take up the post of Inspector General of ESA at the Organisation headquarters in Paris.

Leaving ESA due to age limits in 2000, he returned to Italy for being consultant to ASI (Italian Space Agency) until 2002.
