= European Low Gravity Research Association =

Organization

European Low Gravity Research Association (ELGRA)
- Abbreviation: ELGRA
- Formation: 1979
- Type: Scientific society
- Purpose: Promote research in low- and hyper-gravity in Europe
- President: Philip Carvil
- Website: http://www.elgra.org/

The European Low Gravity Research Association (ELGRA) is a non-profit international society devoted to the promotion of scientific research under various gravity conditions in Europe. The organization, established in 1979 by Luigi G. Napolitano, provides a networking platform for all scientists interested in life and physical sciences and technology in space or on ground. ELGRA aims at representing and strengthening the scientific community of gravity-related research and helping young scientists and engineers get involved in low- and hyper-gravity research through educational programs.

== Goals ==
Since its creation, ELGRA has continuously encouraged and promoted low gravity research in both life and physical sciences within Europe with the permanent support of the European Space Agency. For several years ELGRA was a study group of the Parliamentary Assembly of the Council of Europe and contributed to a better visibility of Low Gravity research at the highest European spheres. However, its main action remains the improvement of the scientific collaboration between scientists from all over Europe in the field of low gravity research. In that effort, ELGRA has organized meetings and symposia resulting in 2019 in the 25th ELGRA symposium which gathered more than 150 scientists from all over the world. ELGRA also supports young researchers and students via grants and educational programs from ESA. The ELGRA community counts not less than 200 active members. The success of ELGRA reflects the increasing interest of the European scientific community for low gravity. Since the 80s, ELGRA's scientists have been using new research facilities either on the ground, as the 133m drop tower at ZARM (Bremem, Germany) or centrifuges (ESTEC, DLR, MEDES), but also in Parabolic flight (Novespace, Bordeaux, France), or in space with the European Columbus (ISS module) aboard the International Space Station dedicated to low gravity research. Nowadays, low gravity space research involves more and more scientists from all over Europe and space experiments require more preparation and especially a strong collaboration between the different partners. A collaboration platform dedicated to low gravity research as ELGRA remains crucial to facilitate this collaboration. Additionally, ELGRA joins both Physical as well as Life Sciences, what enhances translational research.

== History ==
All started in the late 70s with the advent of Spacelab and the possibility of research in low gravity environment on other platforms for microgravity research such as Ariane and TEXUS rockets. These new space facilities have provided scientist with a low effective gravitational field for prolonged periods for research in Life and Materials Sciences and led to a widening European interest in this fundamental research. However, at that time most scientists were working in isolation and it was for them very difficult to plan and manage a low gravity experiment considering operational complexity and the fact that experimenters were widely dispersed geographically.

In 1979, a group of seven scientists (Prof. F. Bonde-Petersen, Denmark, Dr. Y. Malméjac, France, Prof. L.G. Napolitano, Italy, Dr. J.F. Padday, UK, Dr. Stott, UK, Prof. H. Weiss, Germany and Dr. H.S. Wolff, UK) recognized the need for the European scientists involved in low gravity research to form an association to foster the cooperation and the coordination between them and to provide the ground-based expert advisory service for low gravity experiments. On June 18, 1979, the "European Low Gravity Research Association" ELGRA was born.

== ELGRA Symposium ==
- 2019 Granada / Spain: September 24 – 27, 2019
- 2017 Juan-les-Pins / France: October 2 – 6, 2017 More.
- 2013 Rome / Vatican City: Sept. 11–14, 2013 More.
- 2011 Antwerp /Belgium: Sept. 6–9, 2011 More.
- 2010 Triest /Italy: More
- 2009 Bonn / Germany: Sept. 1–4, 2009 More.
- 2008 Angers / France: More
- 2007 Florence / Italy: Sept. 4–7, 2007 More.
- 2006 Toledo / Spain: June 27 – 30, 2006 More
- 2005 Santorini / Greece: Sept. 21 – 23, 2005 More
- 2003 München / Germany: April 2–4, 2003 More
- 2001 Banyuls-sur-Mer / France : Sept. 25–28, 2001 More
- 1999 Roma / Italy: 28 February - 3 March 1999 More
- 1997 Paris / France: March 16–20, 1997
- 1994 Madrid / Spain: December 11–14, 1994
- 1993 Genova / Italy: April 5–7, 1993
- 1992 München / Germany: April 2–3, 1992
- 1991 Köln / Germany: April 16–18, 1991
- 1990 Utrecht / Netherlands: April 9–11, 1990
- 1989 Toulouse / France: March 29–31, 1989
- 1987 Zürich / Switzerland: March 1–3, 1987
- 1984 Noordwijk / Netherlands: January 11–13, 1984
- 1982 Paris / France: October 4–5, 1982
- 1981 Anacapri / Italy: September 14–15, 1981
- 1980 Bad Alpbach / Austria: August 14–15, 1980

== Management Committee ==
The ELGRA Management Committee is elected every two years by ELGRA members during the Biennial Symposium and General Assembly. It is composed of a President, a vice-president, a Secretary, a Treasurer and three members. The President and vice-president are chosen to represent the fields of physical and life science in gravity-related research.

=== Current ELGRA Management Committee ===
Name	Function	Affiliation
Ricard González-Cinca	President	Department of Applied Physics, Universitat Politècnica de Catalunya-BarcelonaTechEd, Barcelona, Spain.
Carole Leguy	Vice-president	Department for Measurement and Sensor Technology, Mülheim an der Ruhr, Germany Discipline: Health and medical technologies, regulatory affairs, cardiovascular space-physiology
Christian Lockowandt	Secretary and Selgra liaison	Science Services Division, Swedish Space Corporation, Solna, Sweden Web: http://www.sscspace.com Discipline: Microgravity Science Instrumentation
Kurt Kemmerle	Treasurer	formerly Kayser-Threde GmbH, Munich, Germany Discipline: Space Science Instrumentation
Eric Falcon	Member	Matter and Complex Systems Laboratory, CNRS - Université Paris Diderot, Paris, France Web: http://www.msc.univ-paris-diderot.fr/~falcon/ Discipline: Nonlinear Physics, Fluid Dynamics, Wave Turbulence, Granular media, Ferrofluid
Philip Carvil	Member	Centre for Human and Aerospace Physiological Sciences Guy's Campus, King's College London, UK Discipline: Human Spaceflight Countermeasures, Human Factors, Physiology, Spinal Imaging, MRI
Marcel Egli	Member	Lucerne School of Engineering and Architecture, Institute of Medical Engineering, Competence Centre for Aerospace Biomedical Science and Technology, Hergiswil, Swiss

=== Former ELGRA Presidents ===
   Monica Monici (2015–2017)
   Valentina Shevtsova (2011- 2015)
   Jack van Loon (2007–2011)
   Daniel Beysens (2003–2007)
   Marianne Cogoli-Greuter (1999–2003)
   Manuel G. Velarde (1997–1999)
   Gerard Perbal (1995–1997)
   Yves Malméjac (1993–1995)
   Jan P.B. Vreeburg (1989–1993)
   Augusto Cogoli (1986–1989)
   Luigi G. Napolitano (1981–1986)
   Herbert Weiss (1979–1981)

== Educational activities ==
- ELGRA is Committed with students and young scientists involved and interested in gravity-related research and technology through a range of actions:
- provide financial support to attend meetings and courses
- organize a student contest and student session in ELGRA meetings
- counsel and support space related student organizations such as LEEM
- support the Education Office of the European Space Agency in the promotion, selection and mentoring of the following educational programmes:
  - Fly YourThesis!
  - Drop YourThesis!
  - Spin YourThesis!

== See also ==
- European Space Agency
- German Aerospace Center DLR
- CNES
- Parabolic flight
- Sounding rocket
- Drop tube
