= International Astronautical Congress =

Annual meeting hosted by a national member of the International Astronautical Federation

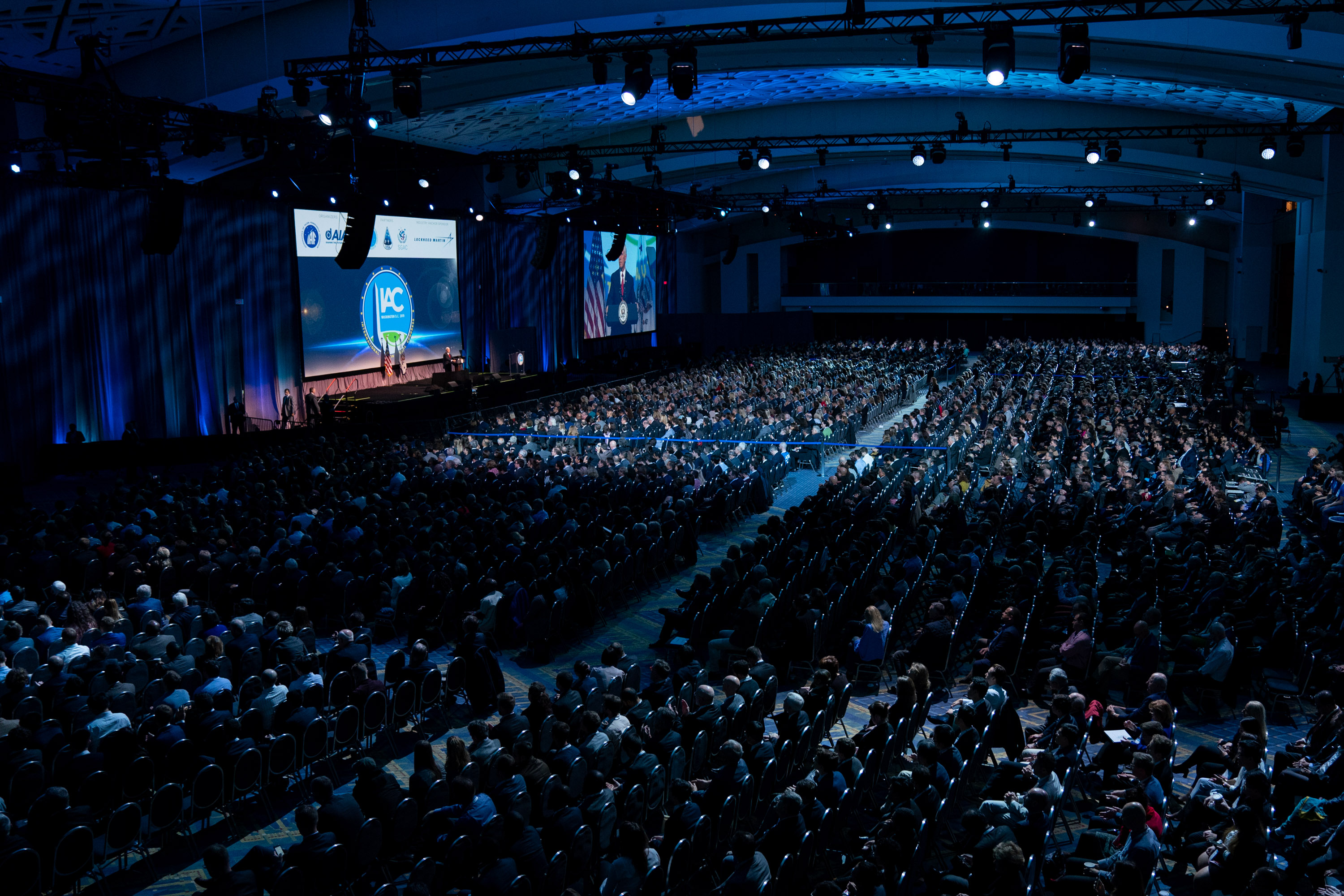
- Opening ceremony of the 70th International Astronautical Congress in Washington, D.C. in 2019
- Status: Active
- Genre: Conference
- Frequency: Annually
- Years active: 75–76
- Website: www.iafastro.org/events/iac/

The International Astronautical Congress (IAC) is an annual meeting of the actors in the discipline of space science. It is hosted by one of the national society members of the International Astronautical Federation (IAF), with the support of the International Academy of Astronautics (IAA) and the International Institute of Space Law (IISL). It consists of plenary sessions, lectures and meetings. The IAC is attended by the agency heads and senior executives of the world's space agencies.

As the Second World War came to an end, the United States and the Soviet Union held different and competing political worldviews. As the Cold War began to take shape, communication between the two countries became less frequent. Both countries turned their focus to achieving military superiority over the other.

Six years after the Iron Curtain fell, the IAF was formed by scientists from all over Europe in the field of space research in order to collaborate once more. During the years of the Space Race, the IAF was one of the few forums where members of both East and West Europe could meet during the annual IAC.

== Founding Organizations ==
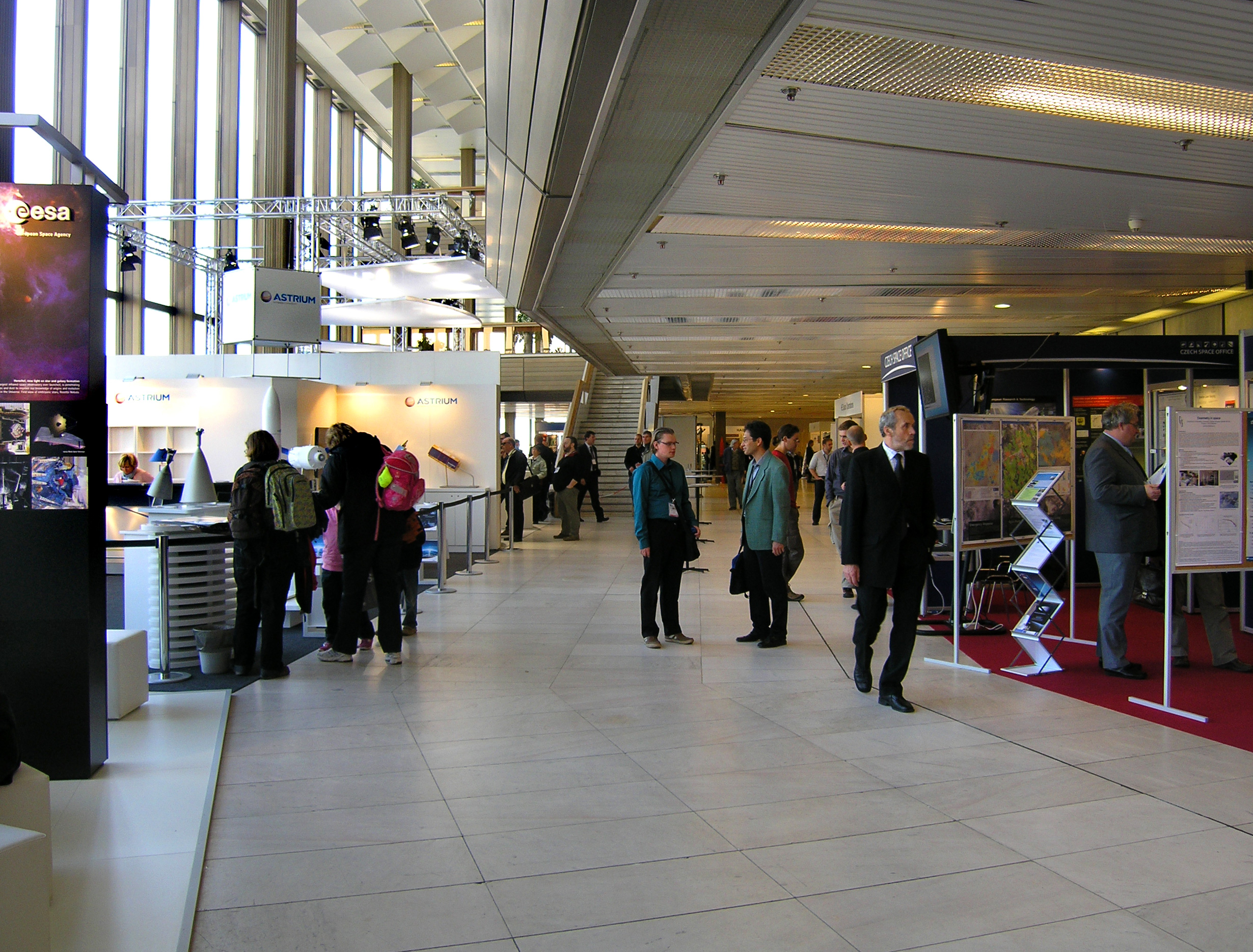
61st International Astronautical Congress in Prague, Czech Republic (2010)

- Argentina: Sociedad Argentina Interplanetaria (Argentine Interplanetary Society)
- Austria: Österreichische Gesellschaft für Weltraumforschung (Austrian Society for Space Research)
- France: Groupement Astronautique Français (French Astronautic Group)
- Germany: Gesellschaft für Weltraumforschung Stuttgart (Society for Space Research, Stuttgart), Gesellschaft für Weltraumforschung Hamburg (Society for Space Research Hamburg)
- Italy: Associazione Italiana Razzi (Italian Rocket Association)
- Spain: Asociación Española de Astronáutica (Spanish Astronautical Association)
- Sweden: Svenska Interplanetariska Sällskapet (Swedish Interplanetary Society)
- Switzerland: Schweizerische Astronautische Arbeitsgemeinschaft (Swiss Astronautical Association)
- United Kingdom: British Interplanetary Society
- United States: American Rocket Society, Detroit Rocket Society, Pacific Rocket Society, Reaction Research Society

== International Astronautical Federation Governance ==
The International Astronautical Federation is a non-profit non-governmental organization created in 1951. Under French law, the IAF is defined as a federation of member organizations where a General Assembly is responsible for making decisions.

=== IAF General Assembly ===
The IAF General Assembly is in charge of governing the Federation. Composed of delegates from every member organization, the assembly is responsible for voting to approve all major decisions regarding the Federation's rules and regulations as well as the acceptance of new member organizations. The General Assembly meets during the International Astronautical Congress.

==== IAF Bureau ====
The IAF Bureau sets the agenda of the IAF General Assembly, including: review of new member candidates; supervision of IAF activities; and supervision of IAF accounts. It is made up of:

- The IAF President
- The Incoming IAF President
- The IAF Honorary Ambassador
- 12 IAF Vice-Presidents
- The IAF Executive Director
- The IAF General Counsel
- The IAF Incoming General Counsel
- The IAF Honorary Secretary
- The President of the International Academy of Astronautics (IAA)
- The President of the International Institute of Space Law (IISL)
- Special Advisor to the President

==== IAF Secretariat ====
This branch is in charge of running the administration of the Federation.

== Locations of past and future International Astronautical Congresses (IAC) ==
International Astronautical Congresses are held in the late summer or fall months. In 2002 and 2012, the World Space Congress combined the IAC and COSPAR Scientific Assembly. The 2020 IAC was held virtually due to the global COVID pandemic.

Edition	Date	Venue
1st	September 30 – October 2, 1950	Paris, France
2nd	September 3–8, 1951	London, United Kingdom
3rd	September 1–5, 1952	Stuttgart, West Germany
4th	August 3–8, 1953	Zurich, Switzerland
5th	August 2–7, 1954	Innsbruck, Austria
6th	August 2–6, 1955	Copenhagen, Denmark
7th	September 17–22, 1956	Rome, Italy
8th	October 6–12, 1957	Barcelona, Spain
9th	August 25–30, 1958	Amsterdam, Netherlands
10th	August 31 – September 5, 1959	London, United Kingdom.
11th	August 13–20, 1960	Stockholm, Sweden
12th	October 1–7, 1961	(United States) Washington, D.C., USA
13th	September 19–23, 1962	Varna, Bulgaria
14th	September 25 – October 1, 1963	Paris, France
15th	September 7–12, 1964	Warsaw, Poland
16th	September 13–18, 1965	Athens, Greece
17th	October 9–15, 1966	Madrid, Spain
18th	September 24–30, 1967	(Socialist Federal Republic of Yugoslavia) Belgrade, Yugoslavia
19th	October 13–18, 1968	(United States) New York, USA
20th	October 5–10, 1969	Mar del Plata, Argentina
21st	October 4–9, 1970	Konstanz, West Germany
22nd	September 20–25, 1971	Brussels, Belgium
23rd	October 8–15, 1972	Vienna, Austria
24th	October 7–13, 1973	(Soviet Union) Baku, USSR
25th	September 30 – October 5, 1974	Amsterdam, Netherlands
26th	September 21–27, 1975	Lisbon, Portugal
27th	October 10–16, 1976	(United States) Anaheim, California, USA
28th	September 25 – October 1, 1977	Prague, Czechoslovakia
29th	October 1–8, 1978	(Socialist Federal Republic of Yugoslavia) Dubrovnik, Yugoslavia
30th	September 17–22, 1979	Munich, West Germany
31st	September 21–28, 1980	Tokyo, Japan
32nd	September 6–12, 1981	Rome, Italy
33rd	September 27 – October 2, 1982	Paris, France
34th	October 10–15, 1983	Budapest, Hungary
35th	October 8–13, 1984	Lausanne, Switzerland
36th	October 7–12, 1985	Stockholm, Sweden
37th	October 4–11, 1986	Innsbruck, Austria
38th	October 10–17, 1987	Brighton, United Kingdom
39th	October 8–15, 1988	Bangalore, India
40th	October 7–13, 1989	Malaga, Spain
41st	October 6–12, 1990	Dresden, Germany
42nd	October 5–11, 1991	Montreal, Canada
43rd	August 28 – September 5, 1992	(United States) Washington, D.C., USA
44th	October 16–22, 1993	Graz, Austria
45th	October 9–14, 1994	Jerusalem, Israel
46th	October 2–6, 1995	Oslo, Norway
47th	October 7–11, 1996	Beijing, China
48th	October 6–10, 1997	Torino, Italy
49th	September 28 – October 2, 1998	Melbourne, Australia
50th	October 4–8, 1999	Amsterdam, the Netherlands
51st	October 2–6, 2000	Rio de Janeiro, Brazil
52nd	October 1–5, 2001	Toulouse, France
53rd	October 10–19, 2002	(United States) Houston, USA
54th	September 29 – October 3, 2003	Bremen, Germany
55th	October 4–8, 2004	Vancouver, Canada
56th	October 16–21, 2005	Fukuoka, Japan
57th	October 2–6, 2006	Valencia, Spain
58th	September 24–28, 2007	Hyderabad, India
59th	September 29 – October 3, 2008	Glasgow, United Kingdom
60th	October 12–16, 2009	Daejeon, South Korea
61st	September 27 – October 1, 2010	Prague, Czech Republic
62nd	October 3–7, 2011	Cape Town, South Africa
63rd	October 1–5, 2012	Naples, Italy
64th	September 23–27, 2013	Beijing, China
65th	September 29 – October 3, 2014	Toronto, Canada
66th	October 12–16, 2015	Jerusalem, Israel
67th	September 26–30, 2016	Guadalajara, Mexico
68th	September 25–29, 2017	Adelaide, Australia
69th	October 1–5, 2018	Bremen, Germany
70th	October 21–25, 2019	(United States) Washington, D.C., USA
71st	October 12–16, 2020	N/A (Virtually livestreamed due to COVID-19)
72nd	October 25–29, 2021	(United Arab Emirates) Dubai, UAE
73rd	September 18–22, 2022	Paris, France
74th	October 2–6, 2023	Baku, Azerbaijan
75th	October 14–18, 2024	Milan, Italy
76th	September 29 – October 3, 2025	Sydney, Australia
77th	October 5-9, 2026	Antalya, Turkey
78th	October, 2027	Poznań, Poland
79th	September/October, 2028	Samarkand, Uzbekistan
80th	October 8-12, 2029	(Switzerland) Genf, Schweiz

== See also ==
- List of astronomical societies
- International Astronautical Federation
- International Institute of Space Law
- International Academy of Astronautics
- Space Generation Advisory Council
