= Space Generation Advisory Council =

Non-governmental organisation

- Type: Non-governmental organisation
- Industry: Space
- Founded: Vienna, Austria (July 1999)
- Headquarters: Vienna, Austria
- Members: 25,000+ members from 165 countries
- Website: www.spacegeneration.org

The Space Generation Advisory Council (SGAC), in support of the United Nations Program on Space Applications, is a non-governmental organization and professional network, whose goal is to convey the perspectives of students and young space professionals to the United Nations (UN), space industry, space agencies, and academia.

== About ==
The SGAC is a network of students, young professionals, and alumni in the space industry that currently represents over 27,000 members across 165 countries. SGAC operates in the six official languages of the United Nations, though the official working language is English.

Since 2018, SGAC has been an official partner of the International Astronautical Federation (IAF). SGAC involves its membership in the development of a progressive space policy that supports advancing humanity through the peaceful use of space. Membership with SGAC is free of charge.

As a non-profit organization, SGAC relies on the sponsorship and support of governmental, non-governmental, and industry organizations and support via donations from individuals.

== History ==
In December 1997, the UN Office of Outer Space Affairs Secretariat invited the International Space University (ISU) to organize a young adult forum, as part of the UNISPACE III Conference in July 1999 in Vienna. The result was the Space Generation Forum (SGF), wherein 160 young people from 60 countries discussed topics relating to the progress of space exploration, which included: science, engineering, technology, law, ethics, art, literature, anthropology, and architecture. More than 100 visions and ideas were generated during the conference, written as recommendations.

The ten most impactful ideas were integrated into the "Declaration of the Space Generation", approved by the UNISPACE III Plenary as the SGF's Technical Report (refer UN-Document A/Conf.184/L.14). Five of these ten recommendations were adopted into the Vienna Declaration on Space and Human Development. One of the recommendations was "to create a council to support the United Nations Committee on the Peaceful Uses of Outer Space by raising awareness and exchanging fresh ideas among young adults. The vision is to employ the creativity and vigor of younger generations in advancing humanity through the peaceful uses of space." From this, the Space Generation Advisory Council in Support of the United Nations Programme on Space Applications was established.

In 2001, SGAC earned Permanent Observer status in UN COPUOS, and in 2003, SGAC earned consultative status with the United Nations Economic and Social Council. The organization officially opened its headquarters at the European Space Policy Institute (ESPI) in 2005 in Vienna and hired its first paid employee in 2006. Today, the organization's professional network comprises over 27,000 members from 165+ countries (updated: 2023) in 6 geographic regions.

== Organization ==
The leadership consists of an executive council, two elected co-chairs, and 12 elected regional coordinators (two per UN region). The Executive Council is supported by an appointed Executive Committee, which is made up of a treasurer, executive secretaries, event managers, and other executive team members. The rest of the organization is made up of the National Points of Contact, up to two per participating nation, and the 27,000+ members who support the Space Generation Network.

A General Assembly is held annually and brings together the National Points of Contact and the Executive Council to approve or reject propositions introduced by the Executive Council and to change the statutes of the organization.

SGAC works with many external space-related organizations from all around the world. The list of SGAC partners includes organizations from industry, government, academia, and other non-profits. A complete list of the sponsors and supporters is available on the SGAC website.

The organization receives advice from its advisory and honorary boards.

=== SGAC Executive Committee ===
The SGAC Executive Committee oversees the organisation’s strategy, governance and activities, representing its global membership and supporting opportunities for young space professionals and students.

=== Advisory Board ===
SGAC's Advisory Board is designed to give strategic direction and advice to SGAC in order to help guide the organization in the fulfillment of its goals and objectives. It provides feedback on the work of the organization and suggests ways in which to improve its functions and its engagement. The board is composed of twelve board members, each of whom serves for a two-year term. The advisory board members are members of the international space community.

=== Honorary Board ===
SGAC’s Honorary Board is composed of individuals who have served the organization in the past and whom SGAC wishes to "recognize for their furtherance of goals similar to those of SGAC".

=== Executive Director ===
SGAC’s executive director is in charge of:

- Representing SGAC at international events and conferences such as the International Astronautical Congress (IAC) and the United Nations (particularly at the United Nations Committee on the Peaceful Uses of Outer Space annual sessions).
- Leading the development and execution of the SGAC strategy.
- Working closely with the SGAC teams on the development and facilitation of opportunities for SGAC's members in the space sector.
- Mobilizing new partnerships, and, in particular, pursuing opportunities for funding in order to ensure financial sustainability for the organization.

=== Operations Officer ===
SGAC’s Operations Officer is responsible for supporting the management of SGAC's operations. This includes project planning, scheduling and managing, capacity and utilization management, delegating work to meet deliverables, and tracking the status of outstanding work from the different SGAC teams.

=== Chairs ===
SGAC’s Co-Chairs are elected for a two-year mandate by the SGAC Executive Committee and are responsible for leading the Executive Committee and supervising the activities of the SGAC staff, contractual obligations, and financial activities.

=== Regional Coordinators ===
SGAC’s Regional Coordinators are members of the SGAC Executive Committee. They coordinate activities in their region, oversee the work of the National Points of Contact, have voting rights on SGAC issues at the Executive Committee, and elect the Co-Chairs of the organization.

== Activities ==
=== SGAC involvement with the UN ===
The Space Generation Advisory Council (SGAC) has a global presence with a diverse member base, and engages across various sectors within the space industry. Outputs from SGAC's events and project groups significantly contribute to shaping space policy at various levels.

These contributions have been acknowledged and cited by numerous delegations within the context of the United Nations Committee on the Peaceful Uses of Outer Space (UN COPUOS).

- UN Committee on the Peaceful Use of Outer Space (COPUOS). SGAC has Permanent Observer status in UN COPUOS and is regularly present at its annual meeting (in June) and at its two subcommittees' meetings: Legal (in March) and Scientific and Technical (in February). As one of the 20 Permanent Observers in COPUOS, SGAC contributes to the activities and action teams of COPUOS with statements and presentations of the various work that SGAC's network produces throughout the year. This includes the reporting of the recommendations gathered at the annual Space Generation Congress, the Space Generation Fusion Forum, and regional and local events.
- UN Office of Outer Space Affairs (OOSA). SGAC works together with OOSA in promoting UN workshops and in supporting SGAC members to attend various conferences around the world.
- UN Economic and Social Committee (ECOSOC). SGAC became a member of ECOSOC in 2003. In this position, SGAC attends the UN General Assembly every year and represents young professionals and university students. SGAC ECOSOC representatives report back on the important recommendations from all UN Member States.
- Space Generation Forum 2.0 (SGF 2.0). In 2018, the Space Generation Forum 2.0 was held to celebrate almost two decades since SGAC's first Space Generation Forum at UNISPACE III in 1999. The Forum was held in Vienna from the 16 to 17 of June 2018 as the international space community convened for UNISPACE+50 and the 61st session of COPUOS. Seven working groups were created, taking into consideration the four pillars (Space Economy, Space Diplomacy, Space Society, Space Accessibility) and seven thematic priorities of the framework in which UNISPACE +50 was developed.
- Space for Youth Competition. In 2019, the UN Office for Outer Space Affairs (UNOOSA) and SGAC launched the Space for Youth Competition for students and young professionals. The initiative is designed to foster innovative solutions and approaches for addressing climate issues by utilizing space technologies. This effort aligns with the objectives of the United Nations' Sustainable Development Goals (SDGs). The United Nations underscores the significance of youth development and involvement as integral elements within its 2030 Agenda for Sustainable Development. In this context, the UN Youth Strategy, inaugurated in September 2018 by the Secretary-General, acknowledges the empowerment, development, and participation of young people as both ends in themselves and as instrumental in shaping a more promising future.

=== Events ===
- Space Generation Congress (SGC). The SGAC holds an annual event called the Space Generation Congress, which is held in conjunction with the International Astronautical Congress (IAC) organized by the International Astronautical Federation (IAF). The event is attended by approximately 150 top university students and young professionals with a passion for space. The attendees are SGAC members selected through a competitive application process. With the Space Generation Congress, SGAC aims to hone and promote the voice of the university students and young professionals on the topic of international space development through the future leaders of the space sector. The Space Generation Congress addresses a diverse range of topics such as autonomy, commerce, community dynamics, discovery, and external engagement. Its findings and proposals are annually submitted to the United Nations at subsequent UN COPUOS sessions. The venue for the Space Generation Congress changes yearly, aligning with the International Astronautical Congress (IAC) which also shifts its location annually.
- Space Generation Fusion Forum (SGFF). The inaugural Space Generation Fusion Forum took place in conjunction with the National Space Symposium on April 15 & 16, 2012 in Colorado, USA at The Broadmoor resort. The SGFF has since become an annual event in conjunction with the Space Symposium in Colorado, USA. The SGFF offers the next young generation of space sector leaders from government, industry, and academia the opportunity to come together to exchange views on current, hot space topics via interactive panels. The program also allows these top delegates to network with each other as well as with today's current space leaders, who speak on and moderate the panels. The Fusion Forum provides an opportunity for international collaboration since the participants come from all over the world.
- SGx. In partnership with Future Space Leaders Foundation (FSLF) and SATELLITE, SGx is a technology-focused event that brings together young professionals, industry experts, and government leaders to discuss pressing issues and innovative ideas.
- Regional Events. The Space Generation Workshop series provides an opportunity to SGAC members to share regional perspectives on space activities. They are large regional events that bring together students and young professionals to discuss current and upcoming space sector opportunities and challenges with a regional perspective. Through these workshops, the SGAC aims to promote the voice of the next generation of space leaders in each of its six regions.
- Local Events. Local events are the backbone of SGAC activities in a country and contribute to connect the global space community. Together with national mailing lists, these events help National Points of Contact to grow their local support networks.
- Online Events. SGAC Project Groups, National Points of Contact, and other SGAC team members regularly organize SGAC Webinars and other activities online. Webinars are an important way for SGAC to generate content for its online presence as well as to connect and engage with its global community. These events make SGAC activities accessible to a much broader audience.

Regional, Local, and Online Events can be organized by any SGAC members by submitting a proposal on the SGAC Events Platform.

=== Project Groups ===
SGAC is divided into several topical focus-groups, called Project Groups (PGs). Each PG is dedicated to a distinct space-related topic (see below) and serves as a platform within which the young space community can share their opinions, discuss, and debate current issues. This structure is designed to consolidate the expertise that exists within the SGAC network and draw in the targeted knowledge, skills and capabilities of young space leaders for the peaceful advancement of space. This structure also ensures coordination among the various segments of the organization.

As of 2020, the organization has a number of active projects:

- Commercial Space Project Group. The Commercial Space project group is a forum and “think tank” on topics regarding the commercial use and the vibrant commercialization of space activities for members of the young generation. The group’s research interests lie in 1) the Context of Commercial Space, 2) Commercial Space Models and Market Segments, 3) the Role of Policy and Law in Shaping the Commercial Space Industry, and 4) Business Models / Entrepreneurship. Besides academic research, the group’s goal is to motivate and support the involvement of young people in commercial space activities through competitions, round tables, and webinars.
- Space Law and Policy Project Group. The Space Law & Policy Project Group was established in the summer of 2012 at the initiative of SGAC members pursuing legal training and building careers in the intersection of the legal profession and the space industry. Open to all members of the SGAC, the group serves as a forum for young professionals and university students to discuss the legal and policy aspects of outer space. Dedicated to investigating and addressing current issues in international and national space law and policy and anticipating likely space law and policy issues in the coming decades, the Project Group pursues projects relevant to the field of space law and policy, and to the broader international space community.
- Near Earth Object Project Group (NEO). The Near-Earth Object Project Group is dedicated to helping the worldwide planetary defense community to meet one of nature’s greatest challenges. The group provides a youth perspective to planetary defense through annual reports, competitions, conference attendance, and public outreach projects related to Near Earth Objects.
- Space Safety and Sustainability Project Group (SSS). The space environment is an international domain and requires collaborative efforts from all space-faring nations to ensure the safety and sustainability of this environment. It is therefore essential that there is a wider awareness of an international culture of space safety and sustainability among the space community. The Space Safety and Sustainability Project Group aims to "assist in building the highest possible degree of uniformity in regulations and standards, procedures, and organization regarding space safety and sustainability". This is achieved through meetings, reports, conference presentations, competitions, and outreach projects.
- Small Satellites Project Group (SSPG). Small satellite programs are particularly attractive since they are “affordable”. The small satellite platform is catering to new actors such as developing countries, students, and amateurs. The SGAC recognized the changing landscape of space exploration using small satellites and initiated the Small Satellite Project Group in response.
- Space Exploration Project Group (SEPG). SGAC Space Exploration Project Group focuses on ongoing and future deep space crewed and un-crewed missions. The group is intended to create an international and interdisciplinary forum focused on different aspects of space exploration, including the development of exploration technologies and capabilities, safety enhancement, the application of space and Earth science, the search for life, and the stimulation of economic expansion. The main focus is the Global Exploration Roadmap (GER) currently being developed by 14 space agencies around the world. The GER Strategy reflects the international effort to prepare collaborative space exploration, beginning with the International Space Station, continuing to the Moon, studying near-Earth asteroids, and with the ultimate goal of preparing for a crewed mission to Mars.
- Ethics and Human Rights Project Group (EHR). The intention of this Project Group is to identify how space technology can best contribute to the realization of the United Nations’ objectives on Human Rights and the Sustainable Development Goals. At the same time, the project group is intended to be a platform for the diversity of peoples who make up the space sector in order to help shape its development to be representative of all humanity.
- Space Medicine and Life Sciences Project Group (SMLS). The Space Medicine and Life Sciences Project Group aims to provide an international and interdisciplinary platform for young professionals in the space medicine and the life sciences sectors. The group provides a "conduit" for students and young professionals to engage in the ongoing activities in the space medicine sector; to optimize human health on Earth, low-Earth orbit, and beyond. Moreover, SMLS aims to incubate and support ideas from the next generation to solve today’s health challenges.
- Space Technologies for Earth Applications (STEA). The Space Technologies for Earth Applications (STEA) Project Group aims to provide a global and interdisciplinary forum for students and young professionals with an interest in the application of space technologies for improvement of life on Earth.
- Space & Cybersecurity. This project group follows the outcomes of the Space & Cybersecurity working group at the European Space Generation Workshop (ESGW) 2018, hosted in Bucharest, Romania to "emphasize the need to reflect on the nature of space and cybersecurity, what the priorities of governments and international institution should be, whether data should remain open source or limited in its availability, possible technical solutions to the challenges posed above, and the shape and origin of threats to cybersecurity in space".

=== Scholarships ===
The SGAC works to provide financial resources for its members to increase youth input and engagement on international space issues. The organization awards numerous scholarships throughout the year to university students and young professionals. These scholarships allow a greater number of members to take part in the international space policy creation process from attendance and presentations at UN COPUOS to participating in SGAC's annual congress, the International Astronautical Congress (IAC), or issue-specific seminars around the world. The Scholarship page of SGAC regularly publishes the available scholarship opportunities to attend the Space Generation Congress (SGC), International Astronautical Congress (IAC), Space Generation Fusion Forum (SGFF), Space Symposium (SS), Space Generation Workshops (SGWs) and other space events.

=== Professional Development ===
With the exception of the SGAC Executive Director and SGAC Operations Manager, all leadership positions and members of SGAC serve the organization on a voluntary basis. SGAC posts vacancies every month which can be consulted on the SGAC vacancies page. Volunteering with SGAC allows members to be recognized internationally as part of the organization’s leadership on the SGAC Team webpage and offers opportunities to develop as leaders in the space sector.

== Alumni and mentoring programs ==
The alumni program was launched at the Space Generation Forum 2.0 in 2018 (after a series of successful alumni activities from 2015-2018) to help reconnect with SGAC Alumni and use the potential of the SGAC alumni network to support other SGAC activities. SGAC Alumni are registered SGAC members who care about the SGAC mission and vision but are over the age limit of SGAC (past their 36th birthday). SGAC organizes a series of activities to help connect its current members with the SGAC alumni and helps facilitate the sharing of knowledge and experiences in this context. These activities include SGAC Alumni Gatherings, SGAC: Through the Generations events, Alumni Spotlight, and mentoring SGAC members as advisors to different projects.

At the Space Generation Forum 2.0 in June 2018 in Vienna, one of the key recommendations presented in recognition of the UNISPACE+50 is to foster development and support in the space sector through mentoring. In response, SGAC created a Mentoring Program for its members. The aim of this program is to connect SGAC members with experts in the space field, especially through the network of SGAC Alumni. Through a mentoring program, SGAC hopes its members will be able to receive support and guidance as they continue to advance in their careers.
