= International Astronautical Federation =

International space advocacy organization

- Formation: 1951; 75 years ago
- Founded at: Paris, France
- Type: Non-governmental organization
- Location: Paris, France
- Members: 397 members from 68 countries
- Official languages: English
- Website: www.iafastro.org

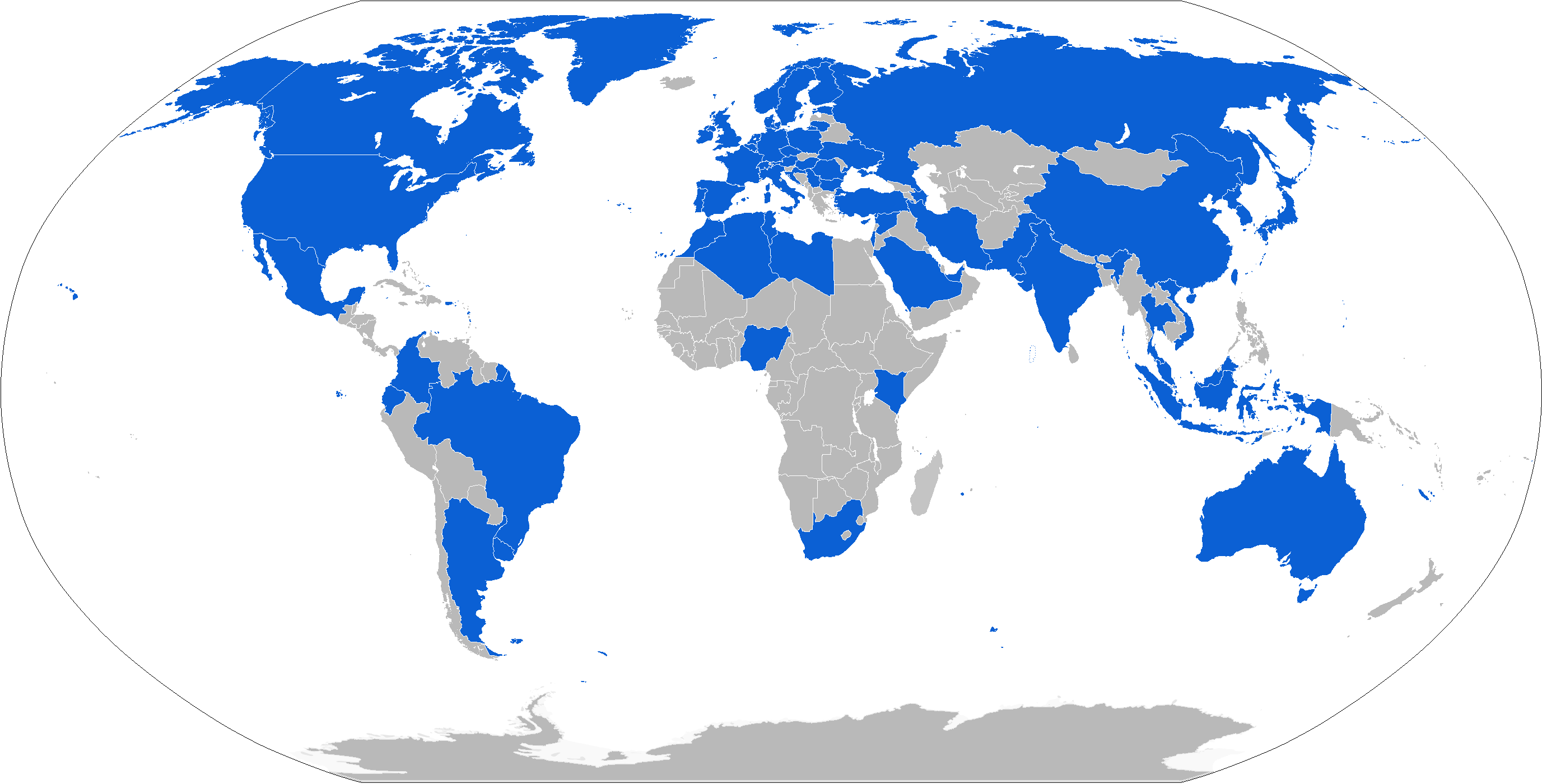
Map with countries hosting IAF members in blue

The International Astronautical Federation (IAF) is an international space advocacy organization based in Paris, and founded in 1951 as a non-governmental organization to establish a dialogue between scientists around the world and to lay the information for international space cooperation. It has over 390 members from 68 countries across the world. They are drawn from space agencies, companies, universities, professional associations, museums, government organizations and learned societies. The IAF organizes the annual International Astronautical Congress (IAC).

== History ==
After World War II, Heinz Gartmann, Gunter Loeser, and Heinz-Hermann Koelle formed the German Rocket Society. They contacted the British Interplanetary Society (BIS) and Groupement Astronautique Français. The French group's leader, Alexandre Ananoff, organized the First International Congress for Astronautics in Paris, France, in September 1950. At the second congress in London, United Kingdom, in September 1951, the International Astronautical Federation (IAF) was organized; at the third congress in Stuttgart, West Germany, in 1952, the IAF constitution was adopted and the organization registered under Swiss Law.

== Events ==
=== International Astronautical Federation Congress (IAC) ===
The IAC is a space event and the largest put on by the organization, with approximately 6,000 participants each year. A different member of IAF is selected by IAF each year to host the IAC. An annual event held in September or October, the congress includes "networking events, talks, and a technical program on advances in science and exploration, applications and operations, technology, infrastructure, and space and society." There are side events including the annual IAF Workshop with the support of the United Nations, which takes place during the 2 days preceding the IAC.

=== IAF Global Conference ===
The IAF Global Conferences are organized annually. Each year they have a specific space-related topic and theme, and are held in alternating or new locations.

- Global Lunar Exploration Conference (GLUC 2010) in Beijing
- Global Space Exploration Conference (GLEX 2012) in Washington, D.C.
- Global Space Applications Conference (GLAC 2014) in Paris
- Global Space Innovation Conference (GLIC 2015) in Munich
- Global Conference on Space and the Information Society (GLIS 2016) in Geneva
- Global Space Exploration Conference (GLEX 2017) in Beijing
- Global Space Applications Conference (GLAC 2018) in Montevideo
- Global Conference on Space for Emerging Countries (GLEC 2019) in Marrakesh
- Global Space Exploration Conference (GLEX 2021) in Saint Petersburg

=== The International Space Forum at Ministerial Level (ISF) ===
The International Space Forum at Ministerial Level (ISF) is an event held by the organization.

The event was founded by the IAF Vice President for Science and Academic Relations in 2015. The gathering pushes discussion on the involvement of universities into space activities, and includes university ministers and delegates from space agencies and other international organizations. Keynote speakers focus on the event's selected theme for the year.

- 2016 International Space Forum at Ministerial Level – ISF Trento
- 2017 International Space Forum at Ministerial Level, the African Chapter – ISF Nairobi
- 2018 International Space Forum at Ministerial Level, the Latin American and Caribbean Chapter – ISF Buenos Aires
- 2019 International Space Forum at Ministerial Level – the Mediterranean Chapter – ISF Reggio Calabria

=== Other ===
- IAF Spring Meetings - The IAF Spring Meetings gather every year in March the IAF community in Paris. For three days, IAF Administrative and Technical Committees meet and the International Programme Committee selects the abstracts to be presented during the year's IAC.
- IAF International Meeting for Members of Parliament - annual meeting for members of parliaments, it acts as an informal forum to discuss space matters. Lasting one day, the events has a keynote speech, and all politicians are allowed to make statements on their home country's developments.
- The IAF Workshop - Organized with the United Nations Office for Outer Space Affairs (UNOOSA), this event "provides space emerging countries with capacity building opportunities in using space science, technologies, applications and exploration in support of sustainable economic, social and environmental development and on the role of industry".

== Awards ==
The IAF runs two large-scale awards schemes for young professionals and students: The Emerging Space Leaders (ESL) Grants, and the Young Space Leaders Recognition (YSL) Programme. This allows young people to attend the IAC free of charge, and have their travel, accommodation and costs paid whilst there.

Every year at the International Astronautical Congress, awards are given out: The main awards are the IAF World Space Award, the Allan D. Emil Memorial Award, the IAF Hall of Fame, the IAF Distinguished Service Award, the Frank J. Malina Astronautics Medal, the Luigi G. Napolitano Award, the AAAF Medals and the Hermann Oberth Medals.

=== World Space Award ===
The World Space Award is designated by the IAF as its "most prestigious award" and as the organization's premier accolade, it is often described as the "world's highest aerospace award." The award is presented to an eminent individual or team at the IAC Congress, after a nomination process, that has made an "exceptional impact to the progress of the world space activities" by their outstanding contributions in the fields of space science, technology, medicine, law, or management.

== Publications ==
The IAF publishes proceedings from its meeting electronically, along with studies undertaken by IAF committees, and other reports.

== List of presidents ==
No.	Image	President	Country	Start	End	Notes
1		Eugen Sänger	West Germany	1951	1953	Inaugural president
2		Frederick Durant III	United States	1953	1956	
3		Leslie Shepherd	United Kingdom	1956	1957	
4		Andrew Haley	United States	1957	1959	
5		Leonid Sedov	Soviet Union	1959	1961	
6		Joseph Pérès / Leslie Shepherd	France / United Kingdom	1961	1962	Pérès died February 1962; Shepherd completed the term
7		Edmond Brun	France	1962	1964	
8		William H. Pickering	United States	1964	1966	
9		Luigi Napolitano	Italy	1966	1968	
10		Elie Carafoli	Romania	1968	1970	
11		André Jaumotte	Belgium	1970	1972	
12		Luigi Napolitano	Italy	1972	1974	First person to be elected twice
13		Leonard Jaffe	United States	1974	1977	
14		Marcel Barrère	France	1977	1978	
15		Roy Gibson	United Kingdom	1978	1980	
16		Luboš Perek	Czechoslovakia	1980	1982	
17		Roger Chevalier	France	1982	1984	
18		Jerry Grey	United States	1984	1986	
19		Johannes Ortner	Austria	1986	1988	
20		George Van Reeth	Belgium	1988	1990	
21		Álvaro Azcárraga	Spain	1990	1994	
22		Karl Doetsch	Canada	1994	1998	
23		Tomifumi Godai	Japan	1998	2000	
24		Márcio Barbosa	Brazil	2000	2004	
25		James Zimmerman	United States	2004	2008	
26		Berndt Feuerbacher	Germany	2008	2012	
27		Kiyoshi Higuchi	Japan	2012	2016	
28		Jean-Yves Le Gall	France	2016	2019	
29		Pascale Ehrenfreund	Austria	2019	2022	First woman elected as president
30		Clay Mowry	United States	2023	2025	
31		Gabriella Arrigo	Italy	2025	present	

== See also ==
- Manfred Lachs
