= Space jurisdiction =

Aspect of what countries can enforce in space

Space jurisdiction, a field addressing what countries can enforce various laws in space, has become more important as the private sector enters the field of space tourism. Under the Outer Space Treaty of 1967, while space and celestial bodies cannot be appropriated by nations, objects launched into space and personnel on board them remain under the jurisdiction of the state of registry.

== International treaties ==
The majority of international treaties currently in existence address only specific aspects of space. No major treaties have been passed that have broad, sweeping jurisdiction in space, and it is largely unclear who would enforce such laws. The treaties currently in existence regarding space law include the following:

- The Outer Space Treaty of 1967
- The Rescue Agreement of 1968.
- The Space Liability Convention of 1972.
- The Registration Convention of 1976.

The Moon Treaty of 1979 was proposed after the Outer Space Treaty, but failed to be ratified by any major space-faring nation such as those capable of orbital spaceflight. If it had been broadly accepted, the result would have been an international regime overseeing extraction of resources from celestial bodies.

== Trade in space ==
Issues of trade and crime in space have not been debated except with respect to the International Space Station. Agreements have involved all units in operation including Europe, the United States, Russia, Canada, and Japan. Three basic levels of agreement include:

- International Space Station Intergovernmental Agreement, an international treaty signed on January 29, 1998, by the fifteen governments involved in the Space Station project. This governmental-level document provides for teamwork between the involved countries in a peaceful Space Station.
- Four Memoranda of Understanding, an agreement between the National Aeronautics and Space Administration and each co-operating Space Agency: European Space Agency, Canadian Space Agency, Russian Federal Space Agency (Roscosmos), and Japan Aerospace Exploration Agency. The objective of these space agencies-level agreements is to specify the roles and responsibilities of each agency in the design, development, operation and utilization of the Space Station.

== Space marriage ==
Space marriage is an aspect of space tourism.

On August 10, 2003, Russian cosmonaut Yuri Malenchenko became the first human to marry in space. A provision in the marriage laws of Texas, USA, that says one party does not have to be present so long as the couple presents an affidavit explaining why one of the two participants in the ceremony cannot attend. This allowed Malenchenko to marry Ekaterina Dmitriev from the International Space Station.

== Other matters of space jurisdiction ==
=== Resource extraction ===
With the failure of the Moon Treaty of 1979 (which would have established a principle of the common heritage of mankind for celestial bodies and required establishing an international regime to supervise use), there is no clear rule regarding the development or use of resources located in space, whether by states or private parties. The United States has asserted a right for U.S. citizens to own space resources they obtain, per the U.S. Commercial Space Launch Competitiveness Act (H.R. 2262) § 51303:

A United States citizen engaged in commercial recovery of an asteroid resource or a space resource under this chapter shall be entitled to any asteroid resource or space resource obtained, including to possess, own, transport, use, and sell the asteroid resource or space resource obtained in accordance with applicable law, including the international obligations of the United States

=== Criminal law ===
Prosecution of crimes committed in space, under current law, would be expected to fall under the same mix of claims of jurisdiction by state of registry, nationality of the perpetrator, and nationality of the victim that govern crimes on the high seas or in Antarctica.

At least until recently, the combination of thorough background checks, vigorous training regimes and strict codes of conduct governing professional spacecrew have combined to make it highly unlikely that anyone inclined to and/or intent on engaging in criminal activity would be launched into space. As of 2025, no person from any country is known to have been charged with (let alone convicted of) a crime committed in space.

In one instance, astronaut Anne McClain was falsely accused by an estranged spouse of committing a financial crime while on the International Space Station, which triggered investigations by the US Federal Trade Commission and the NASA Office of Inspector General; the investigation exonerated McClain and the spouse pled guilty to making false statements to law enforcement.
