= Lunar treaty =

Lunar treaty may refer to:

- Outer Space Treaty, 1967, formally the Treaty on Principles Governing the Activities of States in the Exploration and Use of Outer Space, including the Moon and Other Celestial Bodies
- Moon Treaty, 1979, formally the Agreement Governing the Activities of States on the Moon and Other Celestial Bodies
