= Firouz Naderi =

Iranian American scientist (1946–2023)

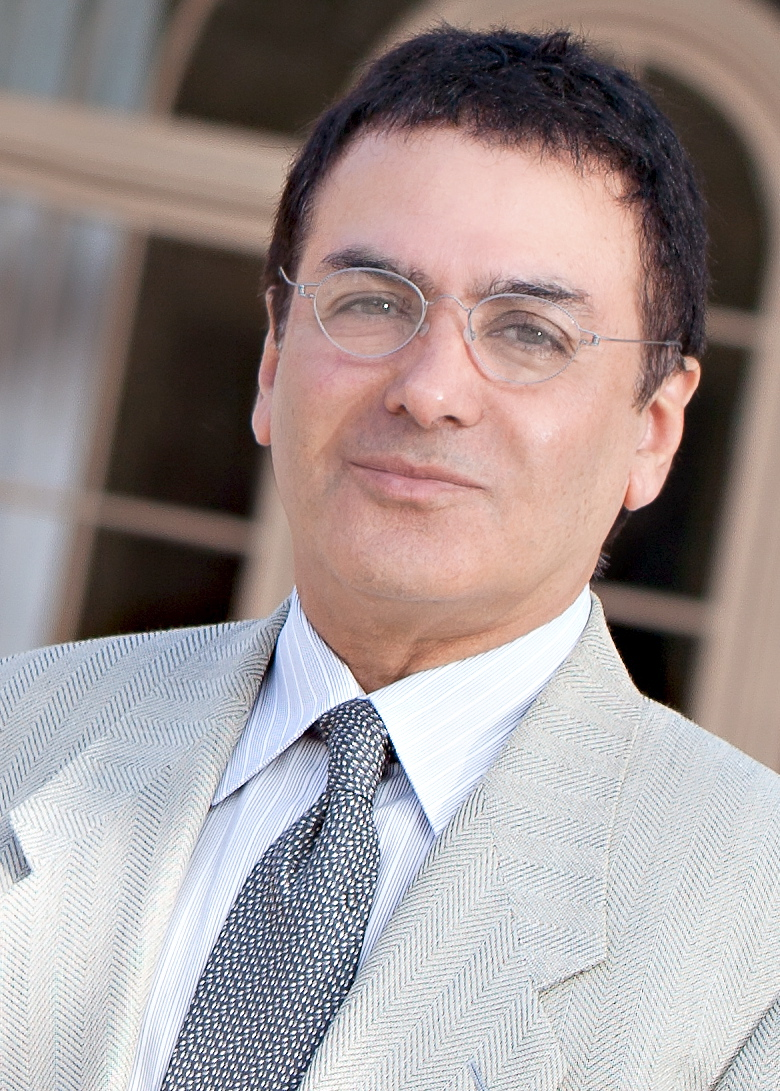
- Naderi in 2010
- Born: Firouz Michael Naderi; March 25, 1946; Shiraz, Iran
- Died: June 9, 2023 (aged 77); Los Angeles, California, U.S.
- Citizenship: American and Iranian
- Education: Iowa State University, University of Southern California
- Scientific career
- Fields: Space Science

Firouz Michael Naderi (Persian: فیروز نادری: Fīrouz Nāderi; March 25, 1946 – June 9, 2023) was an Iranian American scientist who spent 36 years in various technical and executive positions at NASA's Jet Propulsion Laboratory (JPL), where he contributed to some of America's robotic space missions.

Naderi retired from NASA in 2016 and most recently was a management consultant, an advisor to early-stage high-tech startups, and a public speaker. He was based in Pacific Palisades neighborhood of Los Angeles, California.

== Early life and education ==
Firouz Michael Naderi was born on March 15, 1946, in Shiraz, but his birth was recorded on March 25, 1946. His elementary education was in Shiraz, Iran. He attended high school in Tehran, Iran at highly valued Andisheh High School and left Iran in 1964 for the United States to pursue his college education. He received his undergraduate degree in electrical engineering at Iowa State University (ISU) in 1969 before moving to California. After working as an engineer in Santa Barbara for two years, he enrolled at University of Southern California (USC) in Los Angeles where he received his M.S. in 1972 and his Ph.D. in 1976 both in electrical engineering.

After completing his education, he went back to Iran for three years, working at the Iranian Remote Sensing Agency but returned to America in July 1979 a few months after Iran's revolution. He has not returned to Iran since. He was fluent in English in addition to his native language Farsi.

== Career at NASA ==
Naderi started at NASA's JPL in September 1979 as a communications system engineer, and in a course of a three-decade career rose through the ranks to senior executive positions. His career at JPL has spanned system engineering, technology development, program and project management for satellite communications systems, Earth remote sensing observatories, astrophysical observatories, and planetary systems.

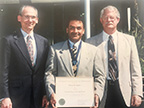
NASA Outstanding Leadership Medal

His early work at JPL was on system design of large satellite-based systems for nationwide cellular phone coverage. He went to NASA Headquarters for two years in the mid-1980s to serve as the program manager for the Advanced Communications Technology Satellite (ACTS), the frontrunner of today's multi-beam, space-switching commercial satellites. Upon his return to JPL, he became the project manager for the NASA Scatterometer (NSCAT) project aimed at space-based radar measurement of winds over the global oceans with application to weather forecasting. He was awarded NASA's Outstanding Leadership Medal for his management of this project. Following NSCAT, in the mid-1990s he managed the Origins Program, NASA's ambitious, technology-rich plan, to search for Earth-like planets in other planetary systems.

=== Management of the Mars Program ===
Naderi was named NASA's Program Manager for Mars exploration in April 2000 after the agency had suffered two consecutive, very public failures in the previous year. In the summer of 2000, he helped re-plan the Program as a chain of scientifically, technologically and operationally interrelated missions with a spacecraft launched to Mars every two years. He led the Program for the next five years, a span of time that included the successful landing of the Mars Exploration Rovers, Spirit and Opportunity. All told, from 2000 to 2012 there has been an unprecedented 6 consecutive successful American missions to Mars (4 landers and 2 orbiters) based on the roadmap devised in the summer of 2000. For management of the Mars Program, in 2005 he was awarded NASA's highest award, the NASA Distinguished Service Medal.

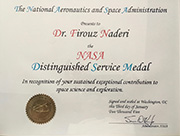
NASA Distinguished Service Medal

=== JPL's Associate Director ===
After the Mars Program, Naderi was appointed JPL's first associate director for Project Formulation and Strategy, serving as the Laboratory's senior official providing oversight of JPL new business acquisition and senior strategic planning officer. He created JPL's Innovation Foundry, an internal startup ecosystem akin to accelerator/incubator outfits in Silicon Valley. For six years, he managed an annual $100M internal investment fund for identifying and maturing nascent technologies, and mission concepts that showed the potential to grow into funded space projects.

=== Director for Solar System Exploration ===
During his last five years at JPL, he was Director of Solar System Exploration with responsibility for the Cassini spacecraft at Saturn, Dawn mission to Asteroids Vesta and Ceres, Juno mission to Jupiter, and formulation of the first-ever Mars helicopter, and a multibillion-dollar mission to Europa (a moon of Jupiter) in search of life outside of Earth.

== Asteroid Naderi ==
After 36 years, Naderi retired from NASA in February 2016. At a farewell party in his honor, it was announced that the International Astronomical Union had renamed Asteroid 1989 EL1 as Asteroid "5515 Naderi" for his contribution to space exploration. The asteroid was discovered by the late American astronomer, Eleanor F. Helin, at the Palomar Observatory in San Diego County, California, on March 5, 1989, and is about 10 kilometers (6 miles) in diameter. It rotates about itself every 5.2 hours and orbits the Sun every 4.4 years. "Fortunately, it is not an Earth-crosser," said Naderi.

== Life after NASA ==
In his post-NASA career, Naderi served as a management consultant, an advisor to early-stage high-tech startups, and a public speaker. He also served as a coach and mentor to the next generation of leaders within the Iranian-American community.

=== Teaching and public speaking ===
Naderi was frequently invited as a keynote and motivational speaker at conferences and workshops. He gave talks to student associations at many universities, including: Stanford University, University of California, Berkeley, University of Southern California, Duke University, University of Toronto, Virginia Tech, University of British Columbia, University of California, San Diego, Texas A&M International University, Texas A&M University at Qatar, the University of Houston, Western Michigan University, and Karlsruhe Institute of Technology—Germany

Naderi taught modules in executive education classes at Stanford University's on "Management of Large Complex Programs".

== Philanthropy and community support ==
Naderi was an advocate for the Iranian-American diaspora formerly having served on the board of directors of Public Affairs Alliance of Iranian Americans (PAAIA). He also served on the advisory boards of several philanthropic organizations, including on Arasteh-Amin Foundation, and in the past on Keep Children in School Foundation (KCIS, and International Society of Children with Cancer (ISCC), and was a board member of Iranica Encyclopedia.

When asked that after living 50 years in America, he feel more American or Persian, he said,

"Being Persian is part of my history and being an American is part of my identity and the two are irretrievably intermixed--like an egg that once scrambled, you cannot separate the yolk from the white. America is my country, and Iran is my homeland. And how blessed I am to be rooted in ancient civilization with a rich culture, and at the same time a proud American living in this young nation that has lifted me on her shoulders, allowing me to reach for the stars."

== Political affiliation ==
Naderi was a registered Democrat. His view on the political system in Iran is that the people living in Iran should decide what is the best system of government for them. But, he favored a democratically elected, secular government, observing full civil liberties and human rights with separation of "church" and state. He had no religious affiliation. However, in an interview in 2011, he called himself a "spiritual" person, believing in "something" beyond himself, but not within the framework of any religion.

== Representing Iran at the 89th Academy Awards ==
Naderi and Anousheh Ansari represented Iranian filmmaker Asghar Farhadi at the 89th Academy Awards for his winning in the Best Foreign Language Film category. Because of Farhadi's absence due to president Trump's 2017 immigration restrictions over seven Muslim countries including Iran; Farhadi selected Naderi and Ansari as his representatives at the Oscars, given that both of them are successful Iranian-Americans who immigrated to the US. On February 26, 2017, they accepted the Academy Award for Best Foreign Language Film for The Salesman on Farhadi's behalf. In the press briefing after the award when asked why he and Anousheh were chosen by the filmmaker to accept the award, he replied that it likely was because both Anousheh and he have a space perspective of Earth, "As you pull away from the Earth and look back at it all you see is a beautiful blue planet without any lines, borders or – walls. Home to all of us".

== Recognitions and awards ==
- Fellow of the American Institute of Aeronautics and Astronautics (AIAA)
- NASA, Outstanding Leadership Medal
- 1997 – Space Technology Hall of Fame Medal
- 2005 – Ellis Island Medal of Honor
- 2005 – NASA, Distinguished Service Medal. This is the highest award given at NASA, for his "distinguished contribution to space science and exploration".
- 2007 – The Engineers Council of Northridge, California, Theodore von Kármán Mission Excellence Award
- 2010 – American Astronautical Society (AAS) William Randolph Lovelace II Award
- 2015 – "Great Immigrants: The Pride of America" by Carnegie Corporation of New York
- 2016 – Asteroid 1989 EL1 renamed Asteroid "5515 Naderi"
- 2022 – inducted into Iowa State University's Department of Electrical and Computer Engineering Hall of Fame
- 2023 – Distinguished Alumni Signal and Image Processing Institute (SIPI), University of Southern California (USC)

== Neck injury and death ==
In May 2023, Naderi experienced a life-altering event that resulted in paralysis from the neck down. He sustained a fall in conjunction with a cardiac episode. As a consequence, he suffered an extensive neck injury that involved damage to the spinal cord. The ensuing paralysis required surgical intervention, and some level of recovery was anticipated within a four to five month period. He died on June 9, 2023, in Los Angeles at the age of 77.

== See also ==
- Mohammad-Nabi Sarbolouki, Group leader at NASA Jet Propulsion Laboratory (JPL)
