= United Nations Committee on the Peaceful Uses of Outer Space =

United Nations committee

- Abbreviation: COPUOS
- Formation: 12 December 1959 (66 years ago)
- Legal status: Active
- Headquarters: Vienna, Austria
- Head: Chairperson; Marius-Ioan Piso
- Parent organization: United Nations General Assembly
- Website: www.unoosa.org/ oosa/en/ourwork/ copuos/index.html

The United Nations Committee on the Peaceful Uses of Outer Space (COPUOS) is a United Nations committee whose main task is to review and foster international cooperation in the peaceful uses of outer space, as well as to consider legal issues arising from the exploration of outer space.

The committee currently has 104 members who meet annually in Vienna, Austria, at the Vienna International Centre in June. Additionally, the Scientific and Technical Subcommittee tends to meet in February, while the Legal Subcommittee usually meets in April.

Member States of the committee, as of 2022.

== History ==
The UN's interest in the peaceful uses of outer space was first expressed in 1957, soon after the launching of the first Sputnik. Its main concern was that space should be used for peaceful purposes and that the benefits from space activities be shared by all nations. Thus, on 13 December 1958, the General Assembly created an ad hoc Committee on the Peaceful Uses of Outer Space composed of 18 members who were tasked with reporting to the Assembly about the activities and resources of the UN, its specialized agencies and other international bodies relating to the peaceful uses of outer space.

The next year, on 12 December 1959, the ad hoc committee was established as a permanent body by the General Assembly with its membership being further increased to 24. It retained the same mission as its predecessor – to review international cooperation in the peaceful uses of outer space.

As the subsequent Space Race between the United States and the Soviet Union heightened, the international community quickly became concerned that space could be used for military purposes. As a result of disagreements between the US and the USSR, the committee did not meet again until March 1962 after the General Assembly compelled it to via Resolution 1721 (XVI). The committee's two subcommittees also met in May and June to discuss scientific, technical and legal questions. These subcommittees were in unanimity with respect to various scientific and technical questions while failing to come to an agreement on legal questions.

Resolution 1721 also further cemented the committee's role in preserving space for peaceful purposes. It stated that international law and the UN Charter applied in outer space and directed the committee to study and report on legal problems arising from space exploration. It directed all states to inform the committee of all launches into space for the UN's public registry. It directed the committee to keep close contact with governmental and non-governmental organizations concerned with space matters, as well as to act as an exchange of information relating to space activities. Finally, it directed the committee to review reports of the World Meteorological Organization and the International Telecommunication Union in regard to outer space activities relating to weather research and analysis and telecommunication and to submit its comments and recommendations on these reports to the Economic and Social Council and the General Assembly. Thus the committee aimed to prevent space from becoming a new frontier for conflict. This gave the committee the unique position of acting as a platform for maintaining outer space for peaceful purposes at the international level.

The United Nations Office for Outer Space Affairs (UNOOSA) has acted as the secretariat to the committee since its creation in 1958. It also provides secretariat services to the committee's subcommittees. All documents related to the committee and its subcommittees are published by UNOOSA.

== Treaties and agreements ==
COPUOS oversees the implementation of five UN treaties and agreements relating to activities in outer space:

- "Outer Space Treaty" – The Treaty on Principles Governing the Activities of States in the Exploration and Use of Outer Space, including the Moon and Other Celestial Bodies
- "Rescue Agreement" – The Agreement on the Rescue of Astronauts, the Return of Astronauts and the Return of Objects Launched into Outer Space
- "Liability Convention" – The Convention on International Liability for Damage Caused by Space Objects
- "Registration Convention" – The Convention on Registration of Objects Launched into Outer Space
- "Moon Treaty" – The Agreement Governing the Activities of States on the Moon and Other Celestial Bodies

COPUOS also keeps track of the following other international agreements relating to activities in outer space:

General

- Treaty Banning Nuclear Weapon Tests in the Atmosphere, in Outer Space, and Under Water (NTB)
- Convention Relating to the Distribution of Programme–Carrying Signals Transmitted by Satellite (BRS)

Institutions

- Agreement relating to the International Telecommunications Satellite Organization (ITSO)
- Agreement on the establishment of the International System and Organization of Space Communications (INTERSPUTNIK)
- Convention for the establishment of a European Space Agency (ESA)
- Agreement of the Arab Corporation for Space Communications (ARABSAT)
- Agreement on Cooperation in the Exploration and Use of Outer Space for Peaceful Purposes (INTERCOSMOS)
- Convention on the International Mobile Satellite Organization (IMSO)
- Convention establishing the European Telecommunications Satellite Organization (EUTELSAT)
- Convention for the establishment of a European Organization for the Exploitation of Meteorological Satellites (EUMETSAT)
- International Telecommunication Constitution and Convention (ITU)

== Near-Earth object deflection and disaster response ==
The Association of Space Explorers (ASE), working in conjunction with B612 Foundation members, helped obtain UN oversight of near-Earth object (NEO) tracking and deflection missions through COPUOS along with its Action Team 14 (AT-14) expert group. Several members of B612 and ASE have worked with COPUOS since 2001 to establish international involvement for both impact disaster responses, and on deflection, missions to prevent impact events. As explained by B612 Foundation Chair Emeritus Rusty Schweickart in 2013, "No government in the world today has explicitly assigned the responsibility for planetary protection to any of its agencies".

In October 2013, the UN committee approved several measures to deal with terrestrial asteroid impacts, including the creation of an International Asteroid Warning Network (IAWN) to act as a clearinghouse for shared information on dangerous asteroids and for any future terrestrial impact events that are identified. Space Missions Planning Advisory Group (SMPAG) should coordinate joint studies of the technologies for deflection missions, and as well provide oversight of actual missions. This is due to deflection missions typically involving a progressive movement of an asteroid's predicted impact point across the surface of the Earth (and also across the territories of uninvolved countries) until the NEO has been deflected either ahead of, or behind the planet at the point their orbits intersect. Schweickart states that an initial framework of international cooperation at the UN is needed to guide the policymakers of its member nations on several important NEO-related aspects. The UN General Assembly endorsed the establishment of IAWN through its resolution 68/75 on 16 December 2023.

At about the same time (Oct 2013) of the UN's policy adoption in New York City, Schweickart and four other ASE members, including B612 head Ed Lu and strategic advisers Dumitru Prunariu and Tom Jones, participated at a public forum moderated by Neil deGrasse Tyson not far from the UN's headquarters, urging the global community to adopt further important steps towards planetary defence against the threat of NEO impacts. Their recommendations included:

- UN delegates briefing their home countries' policymakers on the UN's newest roles,
- having each country's government create defined asteroid disaster response plans, assigning fiscal resources to deal with asteroid impacts, and delegating a lead agency to handle its disaster response in order to create clear lines of communication from the IAWN to the affected countries,
- having their governments support the ASE's and B612's efforts to identify "city-killer" NEOs capable of impacting Earth, estimated at a million, by deploying a space-based asteroid telescope, and
- committing member states to launch an international test deflection mission within 10 years.

The first meetings of IAWN and SMPAG were held in 2014.

== Member states ==
The committee was first established by the General Assembly in its resolution 1348 (XIII) of 13 December 1958 and was originally composed of 18 members. It has grown to include 92 members as of 2019, and is subsequently one of the largest committees of the General Assembly of the United Nations. The evolution of the composition of the committee is as follows:

Year	Number of members	Members	Notes
1958	18	Argentina, Australia, Belgium, Brazil, Canada, Czechoslovakia, France, India, Iran, Italy, Egypt,Japan, Mexico, Poland, Sweden, Soviet Union, United Arab Republic, United Kingdom, United States	(Note: After Czechoslovakia's break up, its seat was taken up by the Czech Republic. Slovakia would later re-join in 2001.) (Note: After the Soviet Union's break up, its seat was taken up by the Russian Federation. Kazakhstan and Ukraine would later re-join in 1994. Azerbaijan would re-join in 2011. Armenia would re-join in 2012. Belarus would re-join in 2013.) (Note: After the United Arab Republic's break up, its seat was taken up by Egypt. Syria would re-join in 1980) (Note: After the Iranian Revolution, Iran's seat was taken up by the Islamic Republic of Iran.)
1959	24	Albania, Austria, Bulgaria, Hungary, Lebanon, Romania	
1961	28	Chad, Mongolia, Morocco, Sierra Leone	
1973	37	Chile, West Germany, East Germany, Indonesia, Kenya, Nigeria, Pakistan, Sudan, Venezuela	(Note: The German seat was combined after German reunification.) (Note: After Sudan's break up, South Sudan left the committee.)
1977	47	Benin, Cameroon, Colombia, Ecuador, Iraq, Netherlands, Niger, Philippines, Turkey, Yugoslavia	(Note: Since Yugoslavia's break up, none of its successor states have joined the committee.)
1980	53	China, Greece, Spain, Syria, Upper Volta, Uruguay, Vietnam	(Note: Upper Volta would later become Burkina Faso.)
1994	61	Cuba, Kazakhstan, Malaysia, Nicaragua, Peru, South Korea, Senegal, South Africa, Ukraine	
2001	64	Saudi Arabia, Slovakia	
2002	65	Algeria	
2004	67	Libya, Thailand	(Note: After the fall of Libyan Arab Jamahiriya, its seat was taken over by the State of Libya.)
2007	69	Bolivia, Switzerland	
2010	70	Tunisia	
2011	71	Azerbaijan	
2012	74	Armenia, Costa Rica, Jordan	
2013	76	Belarus, Ghana	
2014	77	Luxembourg	
2015	83	El Salvador, Israel, Oman, Qatar, Sri Lanka, United Arab Emirates	
2016	84	New Zealand	
2017	87	Bahrain, Denmark, Norway	
2018	92	Cyprus, Ethiopia, Finland, Mauritius, Paraguay	
2019	95	Dominican Republic, Rwanda, Singapore	
2021	100	Angola, Bangladesh, Kuwait, Panama, Slovenia	
2022	102	Guatemala, Uzbekistan	

== Permanent observers ==
In addition to the committee's member states, a number of international organizations, including both intergovernmental and non-governmental organizations, have observer status with COPUOS and its subcommittees. The following is a list of the committee's observers, with the year they were granted that status:

Year	Members
1962	Committee on Space Research (COSPAR)
1972	European Space Agency (ESA)
1976	International Astronautical Federation (IAF)
1985	International Organization of Space Communications (INTERSPUTNIK); International Telecommunication Satellite Organization (ITSO)
1986	International Mobile Satellite Organization (IMSO)
1990	International Law Association (ILA); International Society for Photogrammetry and Remote Sensing (ISPRS)
1993	Association of Space Explorers (ASE)
1995	International Academy of Astronautics (IAA); International Astronomical Union (IAU)
1996	The Planetary Society (TPS)
1997	International Space University (ISU)
2001	European Association for the International Space Year (EURISY); Space Generation Advisory Council (SGAC); National Space Society (NSS)
2002	Committee on Earth Observation Satellites (CEOS); World Space Week Association (WSWA)
2003	Centre Regional de teledetection des Etats de l'Afrique duNord (CRTEAN); International Institute for Applied Systems Analysis (IIASA)
2005	European Space Policy Institute (ESPI)
2007	African Organization of Cartography and Remote Sensing (AOCRS)
2008	European Organisation for Astronomical Research in the Southern Hemisphere (ESO); European Telecommunications Satellite Organization (EUTELSAT-IGO); International Institute of Space Law (IISL); Prince Sultan Bin Abdulaziz International Prize for Water (PSIPW); Secure World Foundation (SWF)
2009	The Asia-Pacific Space Cooperation Organization (APSCO)
2010	International Association for the Advancement of Space Safety (IAASS)
2011	Association of Remote Sensing Centres in the Arab World (ARSCAW)
2012	Ibero-American Institute of Aeronautic and Space Law and Commercial Aviation; Scientific Committee on Solar-Terrestrial Physics (SCOSTEP)
2013	Inter Islamic Network on Space Sciences and Technology (ISNET)
2014	African Association of Remote Sensing of the Environment (AARSE)
2016	International Air Transport Association (IATA)
2017	European Science Foundation (ESF); University Space Engineering Consortium-Global (UNISEC-Global)
2018	CANEUS-International; European Union (EU); For All Moonkind; International Organization of Standardization (ISO)
2019	Moon Village Association (MVA)

== Bureau ==
The following is the Bureau of the committee for its 65th Session, which ran from 1–10 June 2020. The Bureau was selected through formal written procedures after consultation with the Secretariat.

Name	Country	Position
Omran Sharaf	United Arab Emirates	Chair
Jenni Tapio	Finland	First Vice-Chair
Oleg Ventskovsky	Ukraine	Second Vice-Chair and Rapporteur
Juan Francisco Facetti	Paraguay	Chair of the Scientific and Technical Subcommittee
Nomfuneko Majaja	South Africa	Chair of the Legal Subcommittee

== See also ==
- List of government space agencies
- Space law
- SEDS
