= Irania =

Irania may refer to:

- Irania (bird), or white-throated robin, an Old World flycatcher
- Irania (plant), a genus in the family Brassicaceae

== See also ==
- Irania Encyclopedia
- Encyclopedia Iranica
- Iranian (disambiguation)
