= Outer Space Treaty =

Basis of international space law

Treaty on Principles Governing the Activities of States in the Exploration and Use of Outer Space, including the Moon and Other Celestial Bodies
- Parties Signatories Non-parties
- Signed: 27 January 1967
- Location: London, Moscow and Washington, D.C.
- Effective: 10 October 1967; 59 years ago
- Condition: 5 ratifications, including the depositary Governments
- Parties: 118
- Depositary: Governments of the United Kingdom of Great Britain and Northern Ireland, the Union of Soviet Socialist Republics and the United States of America
- Languages: English, French, Russian, Spanish, Chinese and Arabic

Full text
- Outer Space Treaty of 1967 at Wikisource

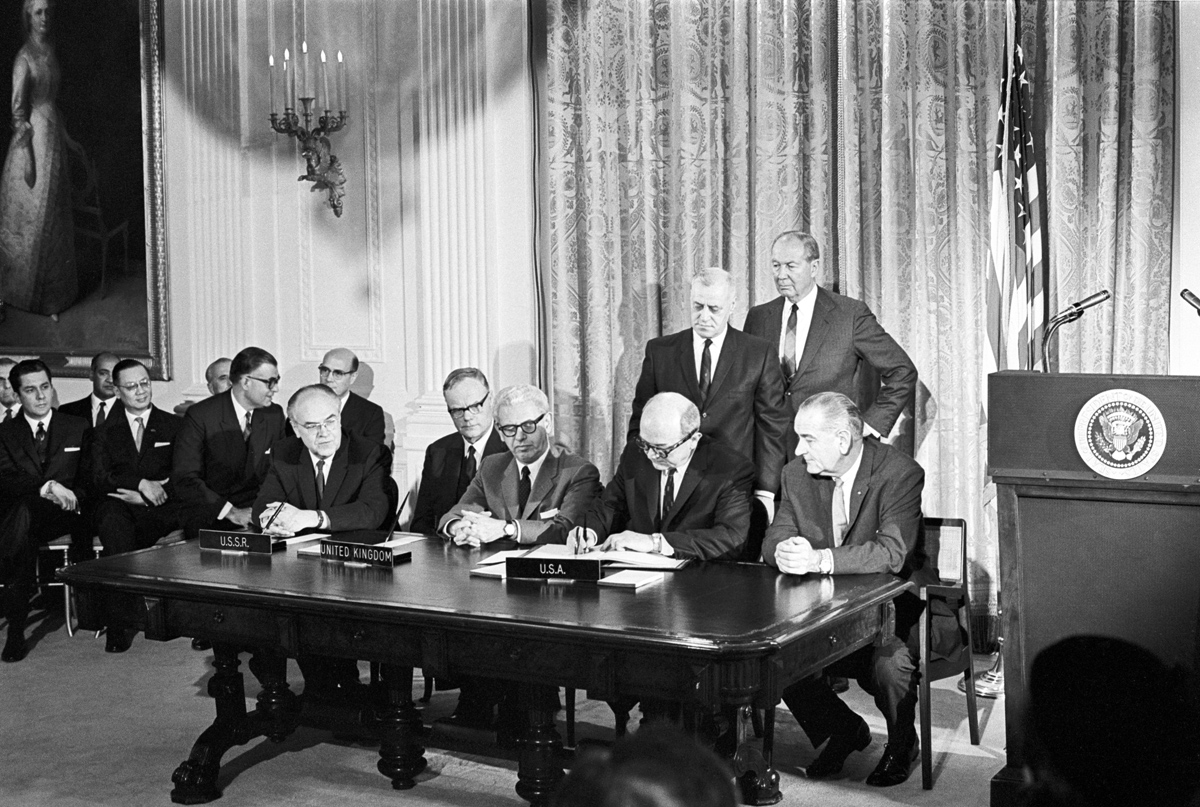
Signing of the Outer Space Treaty

The Outer Space Treaty, formally called the Treaty on Principles Governing the Activities of States in the Exploration and Use of Outer Space, including the Moon and Other Celestial Bodies, is a multilateral treaty that forms the basis of international space law.

Negotiated and drafted under the auspices of the United Nations, it was opened for signature in the United States, the United Kingdom, and the Soviet Union on 27 January 1967, entering into force on 10 October 1967. As of October 2025, 118 countries are parties to the treaty—including all major spacefaring nations—and another 20 are signatories.

Key provisions of the treaty include prohibiting nuclear weapons in space; limiting the use of the Moon and all other celestial bodies to peaceful purposes; establishing that space shall be freely explored and used by all nations; and precluding any country from claiming sovereignty over outer space or any celestial body. Although it forbids establishing military bases, testing weapons and conducting military maneuvers on celestial bodies, the treaty does not expressly ban all military activities in space, nor the establishment of military space forces or the placement of conventional weapons in space.

The OST also declares that space is an area for free use and exploration by all and "shall be the province of all mankind". Drawing heavily from the Antarctic Treaty of 1961, the Outer Space Treaty likewise focuses on regulating certain activities and preventing unrestricted competition that were thought might lead to conflict at that time. Consequently, it is largely silent or ambiguous on newly developed space activities such as lunar and asteroid mining.

OST was the most important link in the chain of international legal arrangements for space from the late 1950s to the mid-1980s. The OST was followed by four additional agreements, with varied levels of accession: the safe return of astronauts who land in a foreign country (1967); liability for damages caused by spacecraft (1972); the registration of space vehicles (1976); and rules for activities on the Moon (1979). As the first and most foundational legal instrument of space law, the Outer Space Treaty and its broader principles of promoting the civil and peaceful use of space continue to underpin multilateral initiatives in space, such as the International Space Station and the Artemis program.

OST was also one of several nuclear arms control treaties signed during the Cold War.

== History ==
The Outer Space Treaty was spurred by the development of intercontinental ballistic missiles (ICBMs) in the 1950s, which could reach targets through outer space. The United States proposed an inspection program for rockets in August 1957. The Soviet Union instead tested ICBMs and launched Sputnik, the first artificial satellite, in October 1957.

From 1959 to 1962, Western allies proposed various outer space arms control treaties, with US president Dwight Eisenhower proposing an outer space treaty similar to the Antarctic Treaty to the United Nations General Assembly on September 22, 1960. According to the United States Department of State, the Soviet Union did not accept these proposals unless the US removed its overseas missile bases. The Soviet Union de-linked these proposals after the 1963 signing of the Partial Nuclear Test Ban Treaty.

On 17 October 1963, the UN General Assembly unanimously adopted a resolution prohibiting the introduction of weapons of mass destruction in outer space. Various proposals for an arms control treaty governing outer space were debated during a General Assembly session in December 1966. US drafts covered only celestial bodies; it accepted the Soviet version which applied a WMD ban to all of outer space. Adoption of the final Outer Space Treaty was completed in January 1967.

== Provisions ==
The Outer Space Treaty represents the basic legal framework of international space law. According to the UN Office for Outer Space Affairs (UNOOSA), the core principles of the treaty are:

- the exploration and use of outer space shall be carried out for the benefit and in the interests of all countries and shall be the province of all mankind;
- outer space shall be free for exploration and use by all states;
- outer space is not subject to national appropriation by claim of sovereignty, by means of use or occupation, or by any other means;
- states shall not place nuclear weapons or other weapons of mass destruction in orbit or on celestial bodies or station them in outer space in any other manner;
- the Moon and other celestial bodies shall be used exclusively for peaceful purposes; prohibits their use for testing weapons of any kind, conducting military maneuvers, or establishing military bases, installations, and fortifications
- astronauts shall be regarded as the envoys of mankind;
- states shall be responsible for national space activities whether carried out by governmental or non-governmental entities;
- states shall be liable for damage caused by their space objects; and
- states shall avoid harmful contamination of space and celestial bodies.

Among its principles, it bars states party to the treaty from placing weapons of mass destruction in Earth orbit, installing them on the Moon or any other celestial body, or otherwise stationing them in outer space. It specifically limits the use of the Moon and other celestial bodies to peaceful purposes, and expressly prohibits their use for testing weapons of any kind, conducting military maneuvers, or establishing military bases, installations, and fortifications (Article IV). However, the treaty does not prohibit the placement of conventional weapons in orbit, and thus some highly destructive attack tactics, such as kinetic bombardment, are still potentially allowable. In addition, the treaty explicitly allows the use of military personnel and resources to support peaceful uses of space, mirroring a common practice permitted by the Antarctic Treaty regarding that continent. The treaty also states that the exploration of outer space shall be done to benefit all countries and that space shall be free for exploration and use by all the states.

Article II of the treaty explicitly forbids any government from "appropriating" a celestial body such as the Moon or a planet, whether by declaration, use, occupation, or "any other means". However, the state that launches a space object, such as a satellite or space station, retains jurisdiction and control over that object; by extension, a state is also liable for damages caused by its space object.

=== Responsibility for activities in space ===
Article VI of the Outer Space Treaty deals with international responsibility, stating that "the activities of non-governmental entities in outer space, including the Moon and other celestial bodies, shall require authorization and continuing supervision by the appropriate State Party to the Treaty" and that States Party shall bear international responsibility for national space activities whether carried out by governmental or non-governmental entities.

As a result of discussions arising from Project West Ford in 1963, a consultation clause was included in Article IX of the Outer Space Treaty: "A State Party to the Treaty which has reason to believe that an activity or experiment planned by another State Party in outer space, including the Moon and other celestial bodies, would cause potentially harmful interference with activities in the peaceful exploration and use of outer space, including the Moon and other celestial bodies, may request consultation concerning the activity or experiment."

=== Applicability in the 21st century ===
Being primarily an arms control treaty for the peaceful use of outer space, the Outer Space Treaty offers limited and ambiguous regulations to newer space activities such as lunar and asteroid mining. It is therefore debated whether the extraction of resources falls within the prohibitive language of appropriation, or whether the use of such resources encompasses the commercial use and exploitation.

Seeking clearer guidelines, private U.S. companies lobbied the U.S. government, which in 2015 introduced the U.S. Commercial Space Launch Competitiveness Act of 2015 legalizing space mining. Similar national legislation to legalize the appropriation of extraterrestrial resources are now being introduced by other countries, including Luxembourg, Japan, China, India, and Russia. In addition, the U.S. has led the creation of a series of bilateral agreements known as the Artemis Accords that seek to clarify a number of issues related to the Outer Space Treaty, including the use of space resources. This has created some controversy regarding legal claims over the mining of celestial bodies for profit.

== 1976 Bogota Declaration ==
The "Declaration of the First Meeting of Equatorial Countries", also known as the "Bogota Declaration", was one of the few attempts to challenge the Outer Space Treaty. It was promulgated in 1976 by eight equatorial countries to assert sovereignty over those portions of the geostationary orbit that continuously lie over the signatory nations' territory. These claims did not receive wider international support or recognition, and were subsequently abandoned. The thinking of the New International Economic Order informs the 1976 Bogota Declaration, but the Declaration was not widely adopted. So orbital space slots remained under the management of the International Telecommunication Union (ITU).

== Influence on space law ==
As the first international legal instrument concerning space, the Outer Space Treaty is considered the "cornerstone" of space law. It was also the first major achievement of the United Nations in this area of law, following the adoption of the first U.N. General Assembly resolution on space in 1958, and the first meeting of the UN Committee on the Peaceful Uses of Outer Space (COPUOS) the subsequent year.

Within roughly a decade of the treaty's entry into force, several other treaties were brokered by the U.N. to further develop the legal framework for activities in space:

- Rescue Agreement (1968)
- Space Liability Convention (1972)
- Registration Convention (1976)
- Moon Treaty (1979)

With the exception of the Moon Treaty, to which only 18 nations are party, all other treaties on space law have been ratified by most major space-faring nations (namely those capable of orbital spaceflight). COPUOS coordinates these treaties and other questions of space jurisdiction, aided by the UN Office for Outer Space Affairs.

== List of parties ==
The Outer Space Treaty was opened for signature in the United States, the United Kingdom, and the Soviet Union on 27 January 1967, and entered into force on 10 October 1967. As of October 2025, 118 countries are parties to the treaty, while another 20 have signed the treaty but have not completed ratification.

Multiple dates indicate the different days in which states submitted their signature or deposition, which varied by location: (L) for London, (M) for Moscow, and (W) for Washington, D.C. Also indicated is whether the state became a party by way of signature and subsequent ratification, by accession to the treaty after it had closed for signature, or by succession of states after separation from some other party to the treaty.

| State | Signed | Deposited | Method |
|---|---|---|---|
| Afghanistan | 27 Jan 1967 (W); 30 Jan 1967 (M) | 17 Mar 1988 (L, M); 21 Mar 1988 (W) | Ratification |
| Algeria | | 27 Jan 1992 (W) | Accession |
| Antigua and Barbuda | | 16 Nov 1988 (W); 26 Dec 1988 (M); 26 Jan 1989 (L) | Succession from United Kingdom |
| Argentina | 27 Jan 1967 (W); 18 Apr 1967 (M) | 26 Mar 1969 (M, W) | Ratification |
| Armenia | | 28 Mar 2018 (M) | Accession |
| Australia | 27 Jan 1967 (W) | 10 Oct 1967 (L, M, W) | Ratification |
| Austria | 20 Feb 1967 (L, M, W) | 26 Feb 1968 (L, M, W) | Ratification |
| Azerbaijan | | 9 Sep 2015 (L) | Accession |
| Bahamas | | 11 Aug 1976 (L); 13 Aug 1976 (W); 30 Aug 1976 (M) | Succession from United Kingdom |
| Bahrain | | 7 Aug 2019 (M) | Accession |
| Bangladesh | | 14 Jan 1986 (L); 17 Jan 1986 (W); 24 Jan 1986 (M) | Accession |
| Barbados | | 12 Sep 1968 (W) | Accession |
| Belarus | 10 Feb 1967 (M) | 31 Oct 1967 (M) | Ratification |
| Belgium | 27 Jan 1967 (L, M); 2 Feb 1967 (W) | 30 Mar 1973 (W); 31 Mar 1973 (L, M) | Ratification |
| Benin | | 19 Jun 1986 (M); 2 Jul 1986 (L); 7 Jul 1986 (W) | Accession |
| Bosnia and Herzegovina | | 29 Sep 2020 (L) | Accession |
| Brazil | 30 Jan 1967 (M); 2 Feb 1967 (L, W) | 5 Mar 1969 (L, M, W) | Ratification |
| Bulgaria | 27 Jan 1967 (L, M, W) | 28 Mar 1967 (M); 11 Apr 1967 (W); 19 Apr 1967 (L) | Ratification |
| Burkina Faso | 3 Mar 1967 (W) | 18 Jun 1968 (W) | Ratification |
| Canada | 27 Jan 1967 (L, M, W) | 10 Oct 1967 (L, M, W) | Ratification |
| Chile | 27 Jan 1967 (W); 3 Feb 1967 (L); 20 Feb 1967 (M) | 8 Oct 1981 (W) | Ratification |
| China | | 30 Dec 1983 (W); 6 Jan 1984 (M); 12 Jan 1984 (L) | Accession |
| Colombia | 27 Jan 1967 (W) | 21 Mar 2024 (W); 16 Apr 2024 (M) | Ratification |
| Croatia | | 10 Mar 2023 (W) | Accession |
| Cuba | | 3 Jun 1977 (M) | Accession |
| Cyprus | 27 Jan 1967 (W); 15 Feb 1967 (M); 16 Feb 1967 (L) | 5 Jul 1972 (L, W); 20 Sep 1972 (M) | Ratification |
| Czech Republic | | 1 Jan 1993 (M, W); 29 Sep 1993 (L) | Succession from Czechoslovakia |
| Denmark | 27 Jan 1967 (L, M, W) | 10 Oct 1967 (L, M, W) | Ratification |
| Dominican Republic | 27 Jan 1967 (W) | 21 Nov 1968 (W) | Ratification |
| Ecuador | 27 Jan 1967 (W); 16 May 1967 (L); 7 Jun 1967 (M) | 7 Mar 1969 (W) | Ratification |
| Egypt | 27 Jan 1967 (M, W) | 10 Oct 1967 (W); 23 Jan 1968 (M) | Ratification |
| El Salvador | 27 Jan 1967 (W) | 15 Jan 1969 (W) | Ratification |
| Equatorial Guinea | | 16 Jan 1989 (M) | Accession |
| Estonia | | 19 Apr 2010 (M) | Accession |
| Fiji | | 18 Jul 1972 (W); 14 Aug 1972 (L); 29 Aug 1972 (M) | Succession from United Kingdom |
| Finland | 27 Jan 1967 (L, M, W) | 12 Jul 1967 (L, M, W) | Ratification |
| France | 25 Sep 1967 (L, M, W) | 5 Aug 1970 (L, M, W) | Ratification |
| Germany | 27 Jan 1967 (L, M, W) | 10 Feb 1971 (L, W) | Ratification |
| Greece | 27 Jan 1967 (W) | 19 Jan 1971 (L) | Ratification |
| Guinea-Bissau | | 20 Aug 1976 (M) | Accession |
| Hungary | 27 Jan 1967 (L, M, W) | 26 Jun 1967 (L, M, W) | Ratification |
| Iceland | 27 Jan 1967 (L, M, W) | 5 Feb 1968 (L, M, W) | Ratification |
| India | 3 Mar 1967 (L, M, W) | 18 Jan 1982 (L, M, W) | Ratification |
| Indonesia | 27 Jan 1967 (W); 30 Jan 1967 (M); 14 Feb 1967 (L) | 25 Jun 2002 (L) | Ratification |
| Iraq | 27 Feb 1967 (L, W); 9 Mar 1967 (M) | 4 Dec 1968 (M); 23 Sep 1969 (L) | Ratification |
| Ireland | 27 Jan 1967 (L, W) | 17 Jul 1968 (W); 19 Jul 1968 (L) | Ratification |
| Israel | 27 Jan 1967 (L, M, W) | 18 Feb 1977 (W); 1 Mar 1977 (L); 4 Apr 1977 (M) | Ratification |
| Italy | 27 Jan 1967 (L, M, W) | 4 May 1972 (L, M, W) | Ratification |
| Jamaica | 29 Jun 1967 (L, M, W) | 6 Aug 1970 (W); 10 Aug 1970 (L); 21 Aug 1970 (M) | Ratification |
| Japan | 27 Jan 1967 (L, M, W) | 10 Oct 1967 (L, M, W) | Ratification |
| Kazakhstan | | 11 Jun 1998 (M) | Accession |
| Kenya | | 19 Jan 1984 (L) | Accession |
| North Korea | | 5 Mar 2009 (M) | Accession |
| South Korea | 27 Jan 1967 (W) | 13 Oct 1967 (W) | Ratification |
| Kuwait | | 7 Jun 1972 (W); 20 Jun 1972 (L); 4 Jul 1972 (M) | Accession |
| Laos | 27 Jan 1967 (W); 30 Jan 1967 (L); 2 Feb 1967 (M) | 27 Nov 1972 (M); 29 Nov 1972 (W); 15 Jan 1973 (L) | Ratification |
| Latvia | | 23 May 2025 (W) | Accession |
| Lebanon | 23 Feb 1967 (L, M, W) | 31 Mar 1969 (L, M); 30 Jun 1969 (W) | Ratification |
| Libya | | 3 Jul 1968 (W) | Accession |
| Lithuania | | 25 Mar 2013 (W) | Accession |
| Luxembourg | 27 Jan 1967 (M, W); 31 Jan 1967 (L) | 17 Jan 2006 (L, M, W) | Ratification |
| Madagascar | | 22 Aug 1968 (W) | Accession |
| Malaysia | 20 Feb 1967 (W); 21 Feb 1967 (L); 3 May 1967 (M) | 21 Oct 2025 (W) | Ratification |
| Mali | | 11 Jun 1968 (M) | Accession |
| Malta | | 22 May 2017 (L) | Accession |
| Mauritius | | 7 Apr 1969 (W); 21 Apr 1969 (L); 13 May 1969 (M) | Succession from United Kingdom |
| Mexico | 27 Jan 1967 (L, M, W) | 31 Jan 1968 (L, M, W) | Ratification |
| Mongolia | 27 Jan 1967 (M) | 10 Oct 1967 (M) | Ratification |
| Morocco | | 21 Dec 1967 (L, M); 22 Dec 1967 (W) | Accession |
| Myanmar | 22 May 1967 (L, M, W) | 18 Mar 1970 (L, M, W) | Ratification |
| Nepal | 3 Feb 1967 (M, W); 6 Feb 1967 (L) | 10 Oct 1967 (L); 16 Oct 1967 (M); 22 Nov 1967 (W) | Ratification |
| Netherlands | 10 Feb 1967 (L, M, W) | 10 Oct 1969 (L, M, W) | Ratification |
| New Zealand | 27 Jan 1967 (L, M, W) | 31 May 1968 (L, M, W) | Ratification |
| Nicaragua | 27 Jan 1967 (W); 13 Feb 1967 (L) | 30 Jun 2017 (W); 10 Aug 2017 (M); 14 Aug 2017 (L) | Ratification |
| Niger | 1 Feb 1967 (W) | 17 Apr 1967 (L); 3 May 1967 (W) | Ratification |
| Nigeria | | 14 Nov 1967 (L) | Accession |
| Norway | 3 Feb 1967 (L, M, W) | 1 Jul 1969 (L, M, W) | Ratification |
| Oman | | 4 Feb 2022 (L) | Accession |
| Pakistan | 12 Sep 1967 (L, M, W) | 8 Apr 1968 (L, M, W) | Ratification |
| Panama | 27 Jan 1967 (W) | 9 Aug 2023 (W) | Ratification |
| Papua New Guinea | | 27 Oct 1980 (L); 13 Nov 1980 (M); 16 Mar 1981 (W) | Succession from Australia |
| Paraguay | | 22 Dec 2016 (L) | Accession |
| Peru | 30 Jun 1967 (W) | 28 Feb 1979 (M); 1 Mar 1979 (L); 21 Mar 1979 (W) | Ratification |
| Poland | 27 Jan 1967 (L, M, W) | 30 Jan 1968 (L, M, W) | Ratification |
| Portugal | | 29 May 1996 (L) | Accession |
| Qatar | | 13 Mar 2012 (W) | Accession |
| Romania | 27 Jan 1967 (L, M, W) | 9 Apr 1968 (L, M, W) | Ratification |
| Russia | 27 Jan 1967 (L, M, W) | 10 Oct 1967 (L, M, W) | Ratification as the Soviet Union |
| Saint Vincent and the Grenadines | | 13 May 1999 (L) | Succession from United Kingdom |
| San Marino | 21 Apr 1967 (W); 24 Apr 1967 (L); 6 Jun 1967 (M) | 29 Oct 1968 (W); 21 Nov 1968 (M); 3 Feb 1969 (L) | Ratification |
| Saudi Arabia | | 17 Dec 1976 (W) | Accession |
| Seychelles | | 5 Jan 1978 (L) | Accession |
| Sierra Leone | 27 Jan 1967 (L, M); 16 May 1967 (W) | 13 Jul 1967 (M); 14 Jul 1967 (W); 25 Oct 1967 (L) | Ratification |
| Singapore | | 10 Sep 1976 (L, M, W) | Accession |
| Slovakia | | 1 Jan 1993 (M, W); 17 May 1993 (L) | Succession from Czechoslovakia |
| Slovenia | | 8 Feb 2019 (L) | Accession |
| South Africa | 1 Mar 1967 (W) | 30 Sep 1968 (W); 8 Oct 1968 (L); 14 Nov 1968 (M) | Ratification |
| Spain | | 27 Nov 1968 (L); 7 Dec 1968 (W) | Accession |
| Sri Lanka | 10 Mar 1967 (L) | 18 Nov 1986 (L, M, W) | Ratification |
| Sweden | 27 Jan 1967 (L, M, W) | 11 Oct 1967 (L, M, W) | Ratification |
| Switzerland | 27 Jan 1967 (L, W); 30 Jan 1967 (M) | 18 Dec 1969 (L, M, W) | Ratification |
| Syria | | 19 Nov 1968 (M) | Accession |
| Thailand | 27 Jan 1967 (L, M, W) | 5 Sep 1968 (L); 9 Sep 1968 (M); 10 Sep 1968 (W) | Ratification |
| Togo | 27 Jan 1967 (W) | 26 Jun 1989 (W) | Ratification |
| Tonga | | 22 Jun 1971 (M); 7 Jul 1971 (L, W) | Succession from United Kingdom |
| Tunisia | 27 Jan 1967 (L, W); 15 Feb 1967 (M) | 28 Mar 1968 (L); 4 Apr 1968 (M); 17 Apr 1968 (W) | Ratification |
| Turkey | 27 Jan 1967 (L, M, W) | 27 Mar 1968 (L, M, W) | Ratification |
| Uganda | | 24 Apr 1968 (W) | Accession |
| Ukraine | 10 Feb 1967 (M) | 31 Oct 1967 (M) | Ratification |
| United Arab Emirates | | 4 Oct 2000 (W) | Accession |
| United Kingdom | 27 Jan 1967 (L, M, W) | 10 Oct 1967 (L, M, W) | Ratification |
| United States | 27 Jan 1967 (L, M, W) | 10 Oct 1967 (L, M, W) | Ratification |
| Uruguay | 27 Jan 1967 (W); 30 Jan 1967 (M) | 31 Aug 1970 (W) | Ratification |
| Uzbekistan | | 17 Oct 2024 (M) | Accession |
| Venezuela | 27 Jan 1967 (W) | 3 Mar 1970 (W) | Ratification |
| Vietnam | | 20 Jun 1980 (M) | The Republic of Vietnam (South Vietnam) signed the treaty in Washington, D.C. on 27 January 1967. After South Vietnam was taken over by North Vietnamese forces, the unified Socialist Republic of Vietnam acceded to the treaty in 1980. |
| Yemen | | 1 Jun 1979 (M) | Accession |
| Zambia | | 20 Aug 1973 (W); 21 Aug 1973 (M); 28 Aug 1973 (L) | Accession |

=== Partially recognized state abiding by treaty ===
The Republic of China (Taiwan), which is currently recognized by 11 UN member states, ratified the treaty prior to the United Nations General Assembly's vote to transfer China's seat to the People's Republic of China (PRC) in 1971. When the PRC subsequently ratified the treaty, they described the Republic of China's (ROC) ratification as "illegal". The ROC has committed itself to continue to adhere to the requirements of the treaty, and the United States has declared that it still considers the ROC to be "bound by its obligations".

| State | Signed | Deposited | Method |
|---|---|---|---|
| Taiwan | 27 Jan 1967 | 24 Jul 1970 | Ratification |

=== States that have signed but not ratified ===
20 states have signed but not ratified the treaty.

| State | Signed |
|---|---|
| Bolivia | 27 Jan 1967 (W) |
| Botswana | 27 Jan 1967 (W) |
| Burundi | 27 Jan 1967 (W) |
| Cameroon | 27 Jan 1967 (W) |
| Central African Republic | 27 Jan 1967 (W) |
| Democratic Republic of the Congo | 27 Jan 1967 (W); 29 Apr 1967 (M); 4 May 1967 (L) |
| Ethiopia | 27 Jan 1967 (L, W); 10 Feb 1967 (M) |
| Gambia | 2 Jun 1967 (L) |
| Ghana | 27 Jan 1967 (W); 15 Feb 1967 (M); 3 Mar 1967 (L) |
| Guyana | 3 Feb 1967 (W) |
| Haiti | 27 Jan 1967 (W) |
| Holy See | 5 Apr 1967 (L) |
| Honduras | 27 Jan 1967 (W) |
| Iran | 27 Jan 1967 (L) |
| Jordan | 2 Feb 1967 (W) |
| Lesotho | 27 Jan 1967 (W) |
| Philippines | 27 Jan 1967 (L, W); 29 Apr 1967 (M) |
| Rwanda | 27 Jan 1967 (W) |
| Somalia | 2 Feb 1967 (W) |
| Trinidad and Tobago | 24 Jul 1967 (L); 17 Aug 1967 (M); 28 Sep 1967 (W) |

== List of non-parties ==
The remaining UN member states and United Nations General Assembly observer states which have neither ratified nor signed the Outer Space Treaty are:

- Albania
- Andorra
- Angola
- Belize
- Bhutan
- Brunei
- Cambodia
- Cape Verde
- Chad
- Comoros
- Republic of the Congo
- Costa Rica
- Djibouti
- Dominica
- East Timor
- Eritrea
- Eswatini
- Gabon
- Georgia
- Grenada
- Guatemala
- Guinea
- Ivory Coast
- Kiribati
- Kyrgyzstan
- Liberia
- Liechtenstein
- Malawi
- Maldives
- Marshall Islands
- Mauritania
- Federated States of Micronesia
- Moldova
- Monaco
- Montenegro
- Mozambique
- Namibia
- Nauru
- North Macedonia
- Palau
- Palestine
- Saint Kitts and Nevis
- Saint Lucia
- Samoa
- São Tomé and Príncipe
- Senegal
- Serbia
- Solomon Islands
- South Sudan
- Sudan
- Suriname
- Tajikistan
- Tanzania
- Turkmenistan
- Tuvalu
- Vanuatu
- Zimbabwe

== See also ==
- Common heritage of mankind
- Extraterritorial jurisdiction
- Extraterritorial operation
- Extraterritoriality
- High-altitude nuclear explosion (HANE)
- Human presence in space
- International waters
- International zone
- Kármán line
- Lunar Flag Assembly
- Militarization of space
- Moon Treaty
- SPACE Act of 2015
- Treaty on Open Skies
- United Nations Convention on the Law of the Sea
