= Irania (plant) =

Scientific classification
- Kingdom: Plantae
- Clade: Tracheophytes
- Clade: Angiosperms
- Clade: Eudicots
- Clade: Rosids
- Order: Brassicales
- Family: Brassicaceae
- Tribe: Alysseae
- Genus: Irania; Hadač & Chrtek

Genus of flowering plants

Irania is a genus of flowering plants in the family Brassicaceae. It includes five species native to Afghanistan, Iran, and Iraq.

== Species ==
Five species are accepted.

- Irania compacta (Rech.f.) Hadač & Chrtek
- Irania membranacea (Rech.f.) Hadač & Chrtek
- Irania multicaulis (Boiss. & Hohen.) Hadač & Chrtek
- Irania pendula (Boiss.) Hadač & Chrtek
- Irania umbellata (Boiss.) Hadač & Chrtek
