= Registration Convention =

1974 United Nations treaty

Convention on Registration of Objects Launched into Outer Space
- ratified signed, but not yet ratified
- Signed: 12 November 1974
- Location: New York City, New York, United States
- Effective: 15 September 1976
- Condition: 5 ratifications
- Signatories: 25
- Parties: 78
- Depositary: Secretary-General of the United Nations
- Languages: Arabic, Chinese, English, French, Russian and Spanish

The Convention on Registration of Objects Launched into Outer Space (commonly known as the Registration Convention or Registration Agreement) was adopted by the United Nations General Assembly in 1974 and went into force in 1976. As of January 2026, it has been ratified by 78 states.

The convention requires states to furnish the United Nations with details about the orbit of each space object. A registry of launchings was already being maintained by the United Nations as a result of a General Assembly Resolution in 1962.

The Registration Convention and four other space law treaties, including the Outer Space Treaty, the Rescue Agreement, the Liability Convention, and the Moon Agreement are administered by the United Nations Committee on the Peaceful Uses of Outer Space.

The European Space Agency, European Organization for the Exploitation of Meteorological Satellites, the European Telecommunications Satellite Organization, and the Intersputnik International Organization of Space Communications have submitted declarations of acceptance of rights and obligations according to the convention.

== Current status ==
The register is kept by the United Nations Office for Outer Space Affairs (UNOOSA) and includes

- Name of launching State
- An appropriate designator of the space object or its registration number
- Date and territory or location of launch
- Basic orbital parameters (Nodal period, Inclination, Apogee and Perigee)
- General function of the space object

Information on registered objects is available at the UNOOSA site

== List of states parties ==
There are currently 72 states parties to the convention.

State party	Signed	Deposited	Entered into force
Algeria	—	9 March 2007	9 March 2007
Antigua and Barbuda	—	13 December 1988	13 December 1988
Argentina	26 March 1975	5 May 1993	5 May 1993
Armenia	—	19 January 2018	19 January 2018
Australia	—	11 March 1986	11 March 1986
Austria	14 October 1975	6 March 1980	6 March 1980
Bahrain	—	6 July 2021	6 July 2021
Belarus (Note: Belarus signed and ratified the Convention as the Byelorussian SSR, which was a republic within the Soviet Union. The current Belarusian state did not begin to exist until after the dissolution of the Soviet Union on 26 December 1991.)	30 June 1975	26 January 1978	26 January 1978
Belgium	30 June 1975	24 February 1977	24 February 1977
Brazil	—	17 March 2006	17 March 2006
Bulgaria	4 February 1976	11 May 1976	15 September 1976
Canada	14 February 1975	4 August 1976	15 September 1976
Chile	—	17 September 1981	17 September 1981
China (Note: On 30 March 1978, the United Kingdom declared that the Convention applied to all its territories, including Hong Kong, whose sovereignty was transferred to China on 1 July 1997. China filed a declaration that upon the transfer, the Convention would continue to apply to Hong Kong.)	—	17 September 1981	17 September 1981
Colombia	—	10 January 2014	10 January 2014
Costa Rica	—	14 October 2010	14 October 2010
Cuba	—	10 April 1978	10 April 1978
Cyprus (Note: Turkey filed a statement when it acceded to the Convention which implicitly stated that it did not intend for the Convention to be in force with Cyprus. Cyprus objected to the declaration on 21 June 2007 and stated that it would recognize the Convention as being in force with Turkey.)	—	6 July 1978	6 July 1978
Czech Republic (Note: Czechoslovakia signed the Convention on 5 April 1976 and ratified it on 26 July 1977, which was also the date it entered into force for Czechoslovakia. Czechoslovakia dissolved into the Czech Republic and Slovakia on 31 December 1992.)	—	22 February 1993	22 February 1993
Denmark	12 December 1975	1 April 1977	1 April 1977
Djibouti	—	14 July 2022	14 July 2022
Finland	—	15 January 2018	15 January 2018
France	14 January 1975	17 December 1975	15 September 1976
Germany (Note: East Germany signed the Convention on 27 August 1975 and ratified it on 12 May 1977, which was also the date it entered into force for East Germany. East Germany was absorbed by West Germany (the current German state) on 3 October 1990.)	2 March 1976	16 October 1979	16 October 1979
Greece	—	27 May 2003	27 May 2003
Hungary	13 October 1975	26 October 1977	26 October 1977
India	—	18 January 1982	18 January 1982
Indonesia	—	16 July 1997	16 July 1997
Italy	—	8 December 2005	8 December 2005
Japan	—	20 June 1983	20 June 1983
Kazakhstan	—	11 January 2001	11 January 2001
Korea, North	—	10 March 2009	10 March 2009
Korea, South	—	14 October 1981	14 October 1981
Kuwait	—	28 April 2014	28 April 2014
Lebanon	—	28 April 2004	28 April 2004
Libya	—	8 January 2010	8 January 2010
Liechtenstein	—	26 February 1999	26 February 1999
Lithuania	—	8 March 2013	8 March 2013
Luxembourg	—	27 January 2021	27 January 2021
Malaysia	—	26 September 2025	26 September 2025
Mexico	19 December 1975	1 March 1977	1 March 1977
Mongolia	30 October 1975	10 April 1985	10 April 1985
Montenegro (Note: Yugoslavia acceded to the Convention on 24 February 1978, which was also the date it entered into force for Yugoslavia. Yugoslavia has since dissolved.)	—	23 October 2006	23 October 2006
Morocco	—	19 September 2012	19 September 2012
Netherlands	—	26 January 1981	26 January 1981
New Zealand (Note: The Convention is not in force for Tokelau.)	—	23 January 2018	23 January 2018
Nicaragua	13 May 1975	11 July 2017	11 July 2017
Niger	5 August 1976	22 December 1976	22 December 1976
Nigeria	—	6 July 2009	6 July 2009
Norway	—	28 June 1995	28 June 1995
Oman	—	10 February 2022	10 February 2022
Pakistan	1 December 1975	27 February 1986	27 February 1986
Paraguay	—	19 January 2023	19 January 2023
Peru	—	21 March 1979	21 March 1979
Poland	4 December 1975	22 November 1978	22 November 1978
Portugal	—	2 November 2018	2 November 2018
Qatar	—	14 March 2012	14 March 2012
Romania	—	9 February 2023	9 February 2023
Russia (Note: Russia is the successor state to the Soviet Union)	17 June 1975	13 January 1978	13 January 1978
Saudi Arabia	—	18 July 2012	18 July 2012
Serbia (Note: Serbia is the successor state to Serbia and Montenegro.)	—	12 March 2001	12 March 2001
Seychelles	—	28 December 1977	28 December 1977
Slovakia	—	28 May 1993	28 May 1993
Slovenia	—	20 February 2019	20 February 2019
South Africa	—	27 January 2012	27 January 2012
Spain	—	20 December 1978	20 December 1978
Saint Vincent and the Grenadines	—	27 April 1999	27 April 1999
Sweden	9 June 1976	9 June 1976	15 September 1976
Switzerland	14 April 1975	15 February 1978	15 February 1978
Turkey	—	21 June 2006	21 June 2006
Ukraine (Note: Ukraine signed and ratified the Convention as the Ukrainian SSR, which was a republic within the Soviet Union. The current Ukrainian state did not begin to exist until after the dissolution of the Soviet Union on 26 December 1991.)	11 July 1975	14 September 1977	14 September 1977
United Arab Emirates	—	7 November 2000	7 November 2000
United Kingdom (Note: On 30 March 1978, the United Kingdom declared that the Convention applied to all its territories, including Antigua and Barbuda, Brunei, Dominica, Saint Christopher-Nevis-Anguilla, Saint Vincent and the Grenadines, and the Solomon Islands, which, except for Anguilla, have all since become sovereign states.)	6 May 1975	30 March 1978	30 March 1978
United States	24 January 1975	15 September 1976	15 September 1976
Uruguay	—	18 August 1977	18 August 1977
Venezuela	—	3 November 2016	3 November 2016

=== Signatories that are not parties ===
There are three states which have signed, but not ratified, the convention.

State	Signed
Burundi	13 November 1975
Iran	27 May 1975
Singapore	31 August 1976

=== Organizations accepting the rights and obligations ===
Several intergovernmental organizations, which cannot be party to the convention, have nonetheless notified the Secretary-General of the United Nations that they have accepted the rights and obligations of the convention.

Organization	Notified
European Organisation for the Exploitation of Meteorological Satellites	10 July 1997
European Space Agency	2 January 1979
European Telecommunications Satellite Organization	10 June 2014
Intersputnik International Organization of Space Communications	10 July 2018

== Proposals ==
A General Assembly resolution from December 2007 that was accepted by consensus recommended that the data should be extended to include:

- Coordinated Universal Time as the time reference for the date of launch;
- Kilometres, minutes and degrees as the standard units for basic orbital parameters;
- Any useful information relating to the function of the space object in addition to the general function requested by the Registration Convention
- The geostationary orbit location, if appropriate
- Any change of status in operations (e.g., when a space object is no longer functional)
- The approximate date of decay or re-entry
- The date and physical conditions of moving a space object to a disposal orbit
- Web links to official information on space objects

== Background ==
For many years, concern has existed surrounding the growing number of dead or inactive satellites in space. These litter the part of space near geostationary orbit and pose a major threat, as any collision would produce serious damage or loss of satellites. As of 2021, there are nearly 12,000 objects registered in the UNOOSA Online Index of Objects Launched into Outer Space.
