= European Telecommunications Satellite Organization =

Intergovernmental organisation

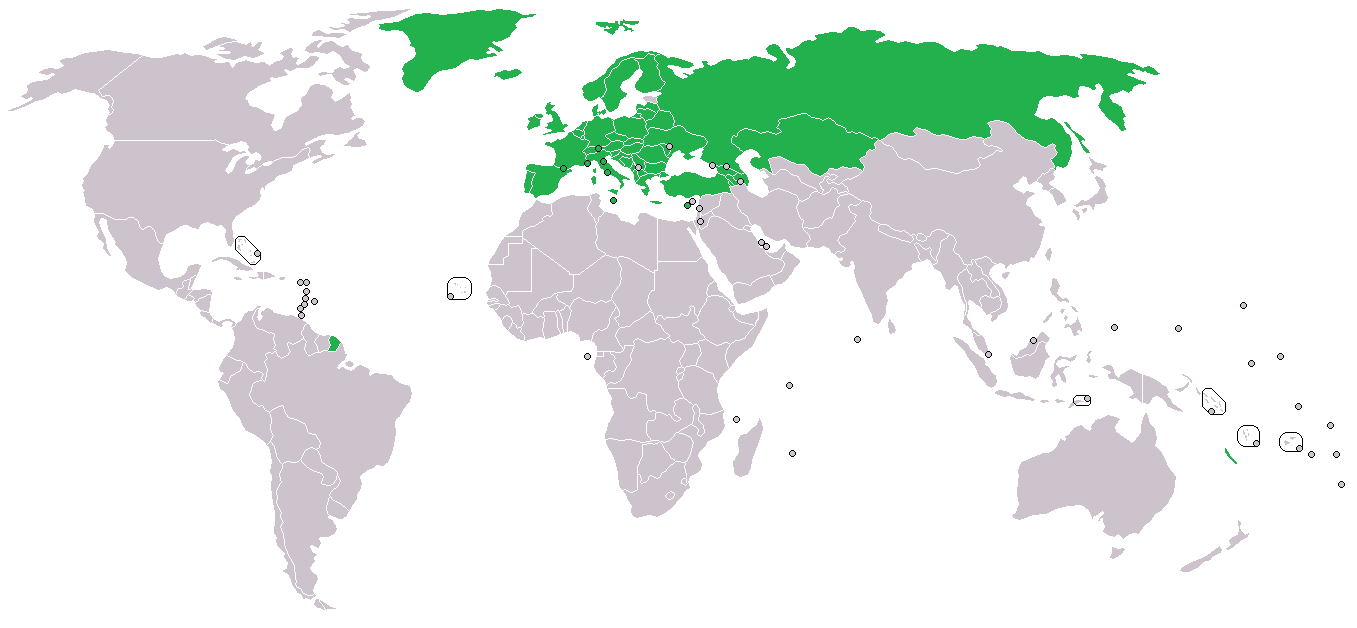
- Current members
- Abbreviation: Eutelsat IGO
- Formation: 1977
- Type: Intergovernmental organisation
- Headquarters: Paris, France
- Region served: Europe
- Members: 49 member states: Albania; Andorra; Armenia; Austria; Azerbaijan; Belarus; Belgium; Bosnia and Herzegovina; Bulgaria; Croatia; Cyprus; Czech Republic; Denmark; Finland; France; Georgia; Germany; Greece; Hungary; Iceland; Ireland; Italy; Kazakhstan; Latvia; Liechtenstein; Lithuania; Luxembourg; Malta; Moldova; Monaco; Montenegro; Netherlands; North Macedonia; Norway; Poland; Portugal; Romania; Russia; San Marino; Serbia; Slovakia; Slovenia; Spain; Sweden; Switzerland; Turkey; Ukraine; United Kingdom; Vatican
- Executive Secretary: Piotr Dmochowski-Lipski (2017–present)
- Predecessors: Christian Roisse (2005–2017); Birgitta Näslund (2001–2005)
- Administrator in charge of External Relations: Estelle Schnitzler
- Project manager in charge of communications: Petra Šajn
- Website: www.eutelsatigo.int

The European Telecommunications Satellite Organization (Eutelsat IGO) is an intergovernmental organisation consisting of 49 member states. It is headquartered in Paris, France. The mission of Eutelsat IGO is to maintain the rights to use radio frequencies and orbital locations which were assigned collectively to the Member States by the International Telecommunication Union (ITU) and to oversee the operations of Eutelsat S.A. so as to ensure that the company complies with the international Eutelsat Convention. Eutelsat IGO plays an active role within the global telecommunications community and is a key actor in the satellite business sector.

== History ==
The European Telecommunications Satellite Organization was created in 1977 on an interim basis by 17 European countries, members of the European Conference of Postal and Telecommunications Administrations (CEPT). Its purpose was to provide Europe with a satellite infrastructure for a wide range of telecommunications services. The Convention establishing the European Telecommunications Satellite Organization Eutelsat was opened for signature in July 1982 and entered into force on 1 September 1985.

The main mission of Eutelsat was the design, development, construction, operation and maintenance of the space segment for international public telecommunications services in Europe. Eutelsat started by providing space segment capacity for basic telecommunications and audio-visual services and rapidly expanded its activities to the provision of services for analogue and digital television, radio broadcasting, business telecommunications, multimedia communications, messaging and positioning in Europe, the Middle East, Africa, Asia and the American continent.

Following the liberalisation of the telecommunications sector in Europe, the Eutelsat Member States decided in May 1999 to restructure the organisation. On 2 July 2001, all assets, liabilities and operational activities of the intergovernmental organisation were transferred to Eutelsat S.A., a private company established in Paris for this purpose. The original Eutelsat Convention was amended with the agreement of the Member States and the amendments entered into force on a definitive basis on 28 November 2002.

There is an agreement between Eutelsat IGO and Eutelsat S.A. for the use of the name Eutelsat. When written in capital letters and followed by IGO it refers to the international organisation while the companies of the Eutelsat Group write Eutelsat in small letters in order to avoid potential confusion.

== Purposes ==
Since its restructuring in 2001, the structure, role, mission and activities of Eutelsat IGO have evolved to reflect developments in the fields of regulation, technology and markets for Fixed Satellite Services.

The primary purpose of Eutelsat IGO is to ensure that Eutelsat S.A. observes the Basic Principles set forth in Article III a) of the Amended Convention referring to public service/universal service obligations, pan European coverage by the satellite system, non-discrimination and fair competition. This supervisory task is executed primarily through the participation of the Executive Secretary on the boards of directors of Eutelsat S.A. and its parent company Eutelsat Communications (Paris Stock Exchange symbol: ETL) as an observer (censeur). This gives him the right to obtain information and voice opinions without having the right to vote.

Eutelsat IGO also ensures continuity of the rights to use radio frequencies of the ITU Radio regulations for the space segment which was transferred to Eutelsat S.A.

Other key activities of Eutelsat IGO include ongoing monitoring of the regulatory environment in European countries and continued collaboration with other international organisations. Eutelsat IGO has the status of an International Organization Operating Satellite Systems (IOOSS) in all three sectors of the ITU and the Executive Secretary and Secretariat participate regularly in International Telecommunication Union (ITU) activities and events of relevance to the Organisation. Since June 2008, Eutelsat IGO has also held permanent Observer status with the United Nations Committee on the Peaceful Uses of Outer Space (COPUOS). The current Executive Secretary of Eutelsat IGO is a Commissioner of the United Nations Broadband Commission for Digital Development and the Organisation is actively advocating for the work undertaken by the commission. The 2018 Report on the State of the Broadband issued in September 2018 featured a contribution from the satellite industry.

Annual tripartite meetings are organised between the Heads of Eutelsat IGO, International Telecommunications Satellite Organization (ITSO) and International Mobile Services Organization (IMSO) with a view to discuss matters of mutual interest and give further consideration for joint initiatives. On 15 May 2019, Eutelsat IGO signed an Agreement on Cooperation with Intersputnik giving the two organisations a mutual observer status. In addition, Eutelsat IGO holds Observer status in Regional Commonwealth (RCC) in the field of communications, an association of several former Soviet republics, which are now independent states.

== Structure ==
Eutelsat IGO consists of the Assembly of Parties to the Eutelsat Convention which meets ordinarily every two years and the Secretariat which is the permanent body of the Organisation. The Secretariat is headed by the Executive Secretary who is appointed for a four-year mandate by and is responsible to the Eutelsat IGO Assembly of Parties. The Executive Secretary is the legal representative of Eutelsat IGO and an observer (censeur) on the Board of Directors of Eutelsat S.A.

Piotr Dmochowski-Lipski of Poland was reelected to the post of Executive Secretary for a third term by the Assembly of Parties in March 2025.

He succeeded Christian Roisse of France, Executive Secretary from 2005 to 2017, and Birgitta Näslund of Sweden, Executive Secretary from 2001 to 2005.
