= Irania Encyclopedia =

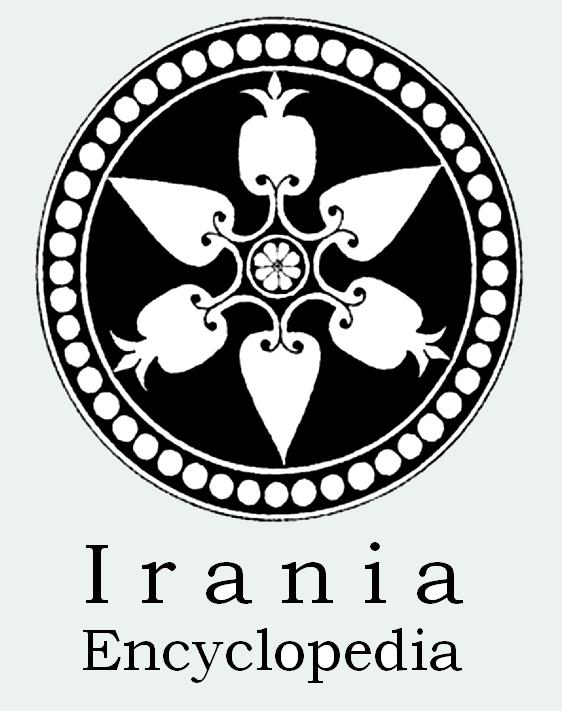
- Author: Reza Moradi Ghiasabadi
- Original title: فرهنگنامه ایران
- Language: Persian
- Published: 2013
- Publication place: Iran
- Media type: Print
- Pages: 848 pp.
- ISBN: 978-964-04-9639-8

The Irania Encyclopedia (Persian: فرهنگنامه ایران, "Farhangnāme-ye Irān") is a reference book for the culture and civilization of the Persian and Iranian Plateau, written by Reza Moradi Ghiasabadi. The encyclopedia has 5,000 entries and 500 photographs.
