= Moon Treaty =

1979 international treaty on celestial bodies

Agreement Governing the Activities of States on the Moon and Other Celestial Bodies
- Participation in the Moon Treaty; Parties; Former parties; Signatories; Non-parties
- Signed: December 18, 1979
- Location: New York, USA
- Effective: July 11, 1984
- Condition: 5 ratifications
- Signatories: 11
- Parties: 17 (as of May 2024)
- Depositary: Secretary-General of the United Nations
- Languages: English, French, Russian, Spanish, Arabic and Chinese

Full text
- Moon Treaty at Wikisource

The Agreement Governing the Activities of States on the Moon and Other Celestial Bodies, better known as the Moon Treaty or Moon Agreement, is a multilateral treaty that turns jurisdiction of all celestial bodies (including the orbits around such bodies) over to the participant countries. Thus, all activities would conform to international law, including the United Nations Charter.

It has not been ratified by any state that engages in self-launched human spaceflight (i.e., the United States, Russia (or its predecessor the Soviet Union), or the People's Republic of China) since its creation on December 18, 1979, and thus it has little to no relevancy in international law. As of May 2024, 17 states are parties to the treaty.

== Objective ==
It was noted that since the 1967 Outer Space Treaty was signed, technologies and society evolved, requiring a redefinition of the rights and responsibilities of citizens and governments alike in the use and development of outer space. The primary stated objective of the 1979 Moon Treaty is "to provide the necessary legal principles for governing the behavior of states, international organizations, and individuals who explore celestial bodies other than Earth, as well as administration of the resources that exploration may yield." It proposed to do so by having the state parties produce an "international regime" that would establish the appropriate procedures (Article 11.5).

== Provisions ==
The Moon Treaty proposes to establish an "international regime" or "framework of laws" that apply to the Moon and to other celestial bodies within the Solar System, including orbits around or other trajectories to or around them.

The Moon Treaty lays several provisions outlined in 21 articles. In Article 11, the treaty makes a declaration that the Moon should be used for the benefit of all states and all peoples of the international community. It reiterates that lunar resources are "not subject to national appropriation by claim of sovereignty, by means of use or occupation, or by any other means." It also expresses a desire to prevent the Moon from becoming a source of international conflict, so that the resources should be used exclusively for peaceful purposes. To those ends, the treaty lays several provisions, and some of these are paraphrased below:

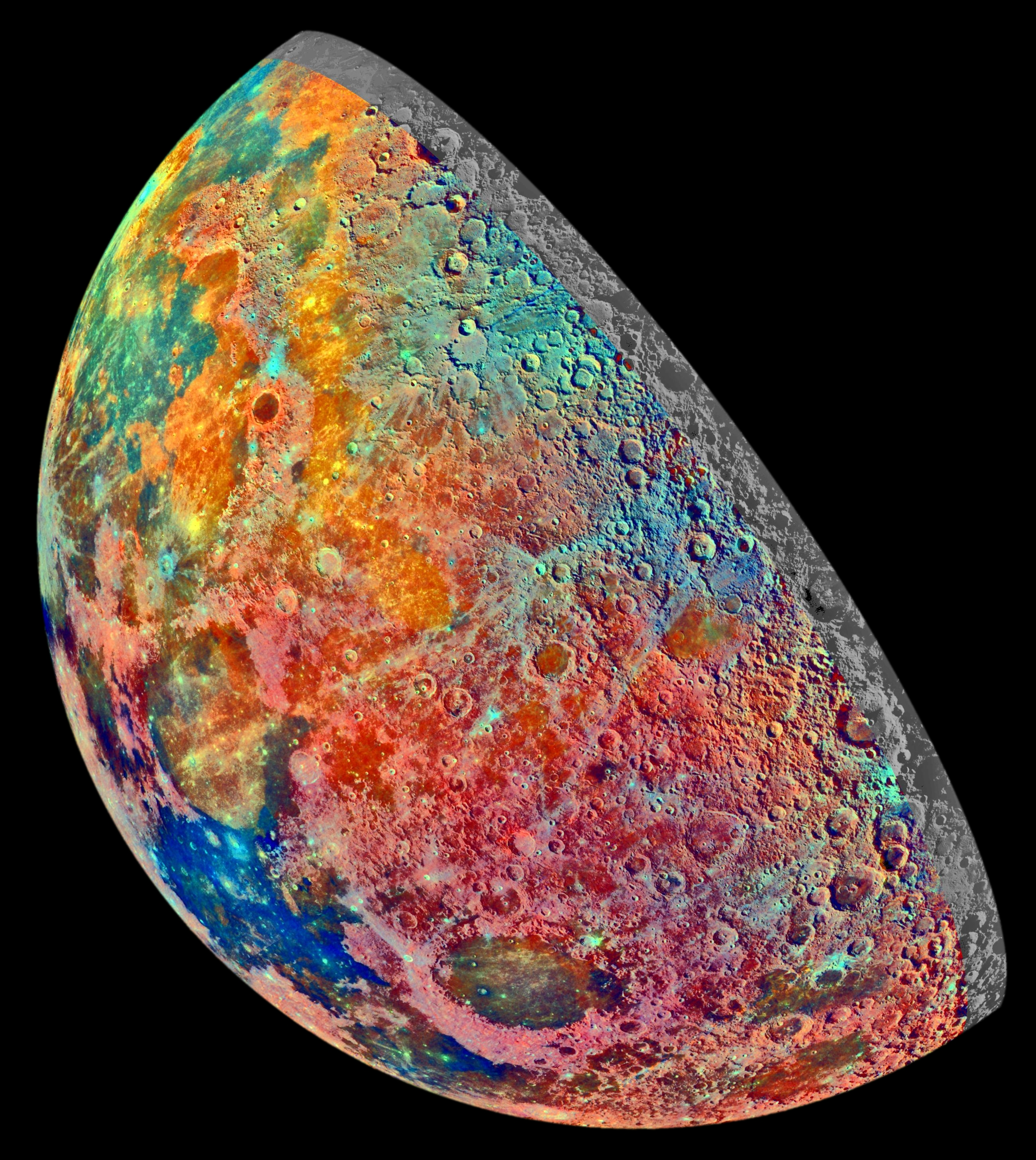
An artificially colored mosaic constructed from a series of 53 images taken through three spectral filters by Galileo's imaging system as the spacecraft flew over the northern regions of the Moon on 7 December 1992. The colors indicate different materials.

- Bans any military use of celestial bodies, including weapon testing, nuclear weapons in orbit, or military bases. The use of military personnel for scientific research or for any other peaceful purposes shall not be prohibited. (Article 3.4)
- Provides a framework of laws to establish an international cooperation regime, including appropriate procedures, to govern the responsible exploitation of natural resources of the Moon. (Article 11.5)
- Bans altering the environmental balance of celestial bodies and requires that states take measures to prevent accidental contamination of the environments of celestial bodies, including Earth. (Article 7.1)
- The orderly and safe use of the natural lunar resources with an equitable sharing by all state parties in the benefits derived from those resources. (Article 11.7)
- The placement of personnel or equipment on or below the surface shall not create a right of ownership. (Article 11)
- There shall be freedom of scientific research and exploration and use on the Moon by any party without discrimination of any kind. (Article 6) Samples obtained during research activities, are hoped to be made available to all countries and scientific communities for research. (Article 6.2)
- Any areas or regions reported to have a special scientific interest, shall be designated as international scientific preserves. (Article 7.3)
- State parties shall promptly inform the United Nations and the public of any phenomena which could endanger human life or health, as well as of any indication of extraterrestrial life. (Article 5.3)
- State parties shall ensure that non-governmental entities under their jurisdiction shall engage in activities on the Moon only under the authority and continuing supervision of the appropriate state party. (Article 14)
- State parties shall inform the United Nations and the public of their activities concerned with the exploration and use of the Moon. (Article 5)

When compared with the Outer Space Treaty, it reiterates most provisions, and adds two new concepts in order to address the exploitation of natural resources in outer space: to apply the concept of "common heritage of mankind" to outer space activities, and to have the participating countries produce a regime that lays the appropriate procedures for orderly mining. Multiple conferences produced no consensus on these two items.

== History ==
After the 1967 non-armament Outer Space Treaty was signed, it was followed in 1968 with the United Nations convened UNISPACE, the United Nations Conference on the Exploration and Peaceful Uses of Outer Space. It was the first of a series of UN-sponsored conferences intended to create an international framework of laws to guide humanity's use of outer space resources.

After ten more years of negotiations, the Moon Treaty was created in 1979 as a framework of laws to develop a regime of detailed procedures, and as such, it remained imprecise: its Article 11.5 states that the exploitation of the natural resources of the Moon shall be governed by an international regime that would establish the appropriate procedures. In order to define this regime or laws, a series of UN-sponsored conferences took place, but brought no consensus. The continuing disagreement is based mainly over the meaning of "Common Heritage of Mankind" and on the rights of each country to the natural resources of the Moon.

=== Ratification ===
The treaty was finalized and endorsed by the UN General Assembly in 1979 and, after satisfying the condition requiring 5 ratifying states, it entered into force for the ratifying parties in 1984. As of January 2019, 18 states are parties to the treaty, seven of which ratified the agreement and the rest acceded. Four additional states have signed but not ratified the treaty. The L5 Society and others successfully opposed signing of the treaty by the United States.

=== National considerations ===
In the United States on July 29 and 31, 1980, the Subcommittee on Science, Technology and Space, which was a part of the Senate Committee on Commerce, Science and Transportation held hearings on the Moon Treaty. S. Neil Hosenball was one of the supporters of the treaty, and he attempted to compare the Moon Treaty to mining rights within the United States. Hosenball was unsuccessful in his attempt to convince the committee that the United States should ratify the Moon Treaty. The opposition, led by Leigh Ratiner for the L-5 Society, stated that the Moon Treaty was opposed to free enterprise and private property rights. Ratiner provided a potential solution to the Moon Treaty, and suggested that there should be legal claims to the Moon and "there should be a system to register such claims. By the way, I'm not speaking of claims to territory...I don't think it's necessary for us to deal with the issue of whether one can make a claim to the land itself, as long as one has the exclusive right to use it."

The last effort culminated in June 2018 after eight years of negotiations, when the United Nations Committee on the Peaceful Uses of Outer Space (COPUOS) held a high-level meeting that tried to produce a consensus on a framework of laws for the sustainable development of outer space, but it also failed to do so when S. Neil Hosenball, who is the NASA General Counsel and chief US negotiator for the Moon Treaty, decided that negotiation of the rules of the international regime should be delayed until the feasibility of exploitation of lunar resources has been established.

However since rights to economic benefits are claimed to be necessary to ensure investment in private missions to the Moon, private companies in the US have been seeking clearer national regulatory conditions and guidelines prompting the US government to do so, which subsequently legalized space mining in 2015 by introducing the US Commercial Space Launch Competitiveness Act of 2015.

Similar national legislations legalizing extraterrestrial appropriation of resources are now being replicated by other nations, including Luxembourg, Japan, China, India and Russia. While the "national" treaty explicitly allows commercial mining, other experts argue that these new national laws are inconsistent with the Moon Treaty and customary international law.

=== Implementation agreement ===
The controversy on claims and on mining rights for profit have dominated the discussion around the laws governing the Moon.

Experts though have affirmed that the Moon Treaty does allow commercial mining, since it allows extraction after the international regulatory regime, that the Moon Treaty asks for, is put into place. Therefore it is concluded, that the Moon Treaty is incomplete and lacks an "implementation agreement" answering the unresolved issues, particularly regarding resource extraction.

== Legal status ==
While the treaty reiterates the prohibition of sovereignty of "any part" of space, the current imprecision of the agreement, being called unfinished, generated various interpretations, this being cited as the main reason it was not signed by most countries. The treaty proposes that the exploitation of resources shall be governed by an international regime (Article 11.5), but there has been no consensus establishing these laws.

The agreement has been described without fruition and possibly a failure if it remains ratified by few countries, particularly those active in space. Only two countries (France and India) with independent spaceflight capabilities have signed (but not ratified) the treaty.

Echoing legal experts S. Neil Hosenball, who is the NASA General Counsel and chief US negotiator for the Moon Treaty, decided in 2018 that negotiation of the rules of this international regime should be delayed until the feasibility of exploitation of lunar resources has been established. A commercial lawyer in international litigation summarized that the treaty would need to offer adequate provisions against any one company acquiring a monopoly position in the world minerals market, while avoiding "the socialization of the Moon."

In 2020 the Artemis Accords were signed, while not mentioning the treaty, they are nevertheless challenging the treaty. At the time of the signing of the accords U.S. President Donald Trump additionally released an executive order called "Encouraging International Support for the Recovery and Use of Space Resources." The order emphasizes that "the United States does not view outer space as a 'global commons" and calls the Moon Agreement "a failed attempt at constraining free enterprise."

With Australia signing and ratifying both the Moon Treaty as well as the Artemis Accords, there has been a discussion if they can be harmonized. In this light an Implementation Agreement for the Moon Treaty has been advocated for, as a way to compensate for the shortcomings of the Moon Treaty and to harmonize it with other laws, allowing it to be more widely accepted.

== List of parties ==
State	Signed	Deposited	Method
Armenia		19 Jan 2018	Accession
Australia		7 Jul 1986	Accession
Austria	21 May 1980	11 Jun 1984	Ratification
Belgium		29 Jun 2004	Accession
Chile	3 Jan 1980	12 Nov 1981	Ratification
Kazakhstan		11 Jan 2001	Accession
Kuwait		28 Apr 2014	Accession
Lebanon		12 Apr 2006	Accession
Mexico		11 Oct 1991	Accession
Morocco	25 Jul 1980	21 Jan 1993	Ratification
Netherlands	27 Jan 1981	17 Feb 1983	Ratification
Pakistan		27 Feb 1986	Accession
Peru	23 Jun 1981	23 Nov 2005	Ratification
Philippines	23 Apr 1980	26 May 1981	Ratification
Turkey		29 Feb 2012	Accession
Uruguay	1 Jun 1981	9 Nov 1981	Ratification
Venezuela		3 Nov 2016	Accession

== List of signatories ==
State	Signed
France	29 Jan 1980
Guatemala	20 Nov 1980
India	18 Jan 1982
Romania	17 Apr 1980

== List of former parties ==
State	Signed	Deposited	Method	Withdrawal notified	Withdrawal effective
Saudi Arabia		18 Jul 2012	Accession	5 Jan 2023	5 Jan 2024

== See also ==
- Politics of outer space – Political considerations of space policy
- Space law – Law governing activities in outer space
- Outer Space Treaty – Basis of international space law
- Treaty on Open Skies – Promoting openness and transparency of military forces and activities
- United Nations Convention on the Law of the Sea – International maritime law
- Artemis Accords – Multilateral agreement on human moon exploration
- Treaty on the Prohibition of Nuclear Weapons – Legally binding international agreement to prohibit nuclear weapons
- Rights of nature – Legal theory
