= Intersputnik =

International satellite communications services organization

Intersputnik Intersputnik International Organization of Space Communications
- Intersputnik logo
- Formation: 15 November 1971; 54 years ago
- Legal status: Active
- Headquarters: Moscow, Russia
- Members: 25 member states
- Official language: Russian
- Director General: Ksenia Drozdova
- Website: intersputnik.int

The Intersputnik International Organization of Space Communications, commonly known as Intersputnik, is an international satellite communications services organization founded on 15 November 1971, in Moscow by the Soviet Union along with a group of seven formerly socialist states (Poland, Czechoslovakia, East Germany, Hungary, Romania, Bulgaria, Mongolia) and Cuba.

The objective was and continues to be the development and common use of communications satellites. It was created as the Eastern Bloc's response to the Western Intelsat organization. As of 2026, the organization has 25 member states. In turn with political realignments, a number of countries have left (Germany and Poland) or are in the process of leaving (Czechia, Bulgaria and Ukraine).

Intersputnik nowadays is a commercially aligned organization. It operates 12 satellites in orbit and 41 transponders. In June 1997 Intersputnik created the Lockheed Martin Intersputnik (LMI) joint venture together with Lockheed Martin, which built and operated the satellites of the same name. In September 2006, Lockheed Martin Intersputnik was acquired by Asia Broadcast Satellite (ABS).

== History ==
Initially, the Intersputnik system was created on the basis of the Soviet Orbit-2 satellite broadcasting network and was designed to serve the countries participating in the Council for Mutual Economic Assistance (Comecon). The main system and technical developments were carried out by NIIR, radio receiving equipment was produced at the Moscow Radio Engineering Plant, antenna-feeder devices at the Podolsk Electromechanical Plant, radio transmitting and channel-forming equipment was manufactured by the Krasnoyarsk TV Plant.

In the initial version, Intersputnik used highly elliptical satellites of the Molniya-3 type, and in 1978 it began using geostationary satellites of the Gorizont type. Receiving complexes "Orbita-2" with transmitters "Gradient-K" and channel-forming equipment RS-1, RS-2 operated at the earth stations. In the process of modernization, the transmitters were replaced by more modern Helikon type with a power of 3 kW and new channel-forming equipment “Gradient-N” began to be used. Subsequently, the Research Institute for Telecommunication (TKI) in Budapest took part in the development of the equipment for Intersputnik, and factories in Hungary and Czechoslovakia were connected to production.

== Member states ==
- Afghanistan
- Azerbaijan
- Belarus
- Cambodia
- Cuba
- Georgia
- Hungary
- India
- Kazakhstan
- Kyrgyzstan
- Laos
- Mongolia
- Nicaragua
- North Korea
- Romania
- Russia
- Somalia
- Syria
- Tajikistan
- Turkmenistan
- Vietnam
- Yemen

Intersputnik member states as of 2026

The United Nations Office for Outer Space Affairs maintains a list of space treaty member countries, including the Intersputnik treaty.

=== Currently withdrawing ===
- Bulgaria (announced withdrawal on 18 December 2025)
- Czech Republic (announced withdrawal in February 2025)
- Ukraine

=== Former ===
- Germany (until 24 July 2023), in succession of East Germany
- Poland (until 12 August 2025)

== See also ==
- Ground stations
- Communications satellite
- Submarine communications cable
- European Telecommunications Satellite Organization
