= Space traffic management =

Space traffic management is defined by the International Academy of Astronautics (IAA) as "the set of technical and regulatory provisions for promoting safe access into outer space, operations in outer space and return from outer space to Earth free from physical or radio-frequency interference."

Space traffic includes launch vehicles, as well as orbiting objects such as satellites of all sizes and the International Space Station. Space debris risk mitigation is major concern because collision with space debris can destroy vehicles and other space assets.

== Policy Making ==
Policy making can be performed on a different scales on a national level and on an international level, to establish international cooperation that will coordinate the activities of all nations to avoid collision, space debris, and the loss of space assets and services. The United Nations bureau most concerned with space traffic management is the United Nations Office for Outer Space Affairs (UNOOSA).

=== United Nations Activities ===
In 2007 the resolution A/RES/62/101 about the Recommendations on enhancing the practice of States and international intergovernmental organizations in registering space objects was released by United Nations. Furthermore resources and reference Material was released for States & Organizations to register space objects provided the initial results of discussions and raise international awareness about an international cooperation for space traffic management. Space traffic management can be regarded as part of international space law.

=== National Policies ===
In the United States, President Donald Trump signed Space Policy Directive-3 on 18 June 2018, which defined Space Traffic Management (STM) as "the planning, coordination, and on-orbit synchronization of activities to enhance the safety, stability, and sustainability of operations in the space environment.

== Space diplomacy & Space traffic ==
Bringing objects into outer space and provide a specific service for earth observation, communication or any other scientific, commercial or military application is not only about technical and domain specific problem solving. Space Diplomacy is involved if specific international negotiations are involved to represent national interests in an international Space Traffic Management. E.g the Global Positioning System (GPS) as a satellite-based infrastructure developed by the U.S. Department of Defense provides the globally available signal for navigation for civilian users and additional encrypted services of U.S. and allied military forces. The European Union (EU) decided to provide an alternative to GPS by building "Galileo" as an independent European satellite navigation system. Space diplomacy is relevant to deal with conflicting national interest and identify international regulations that assure security, efficiency and cooperation for space activities in a sustainable way.

== See also ==
- Space debris
  - Collision avoidance (spacecraft)
- Commercialization of space
- Institute of Space and Telecommunications Law
- Metalaw
- Moon Treaty
- NewSpace
- Outer Space Treaty
- Politics of the International Space Station
- Space advocacy
- Space policy
- ESA's Space Safety Programme
