= Space law =

Law governing activities in outer space

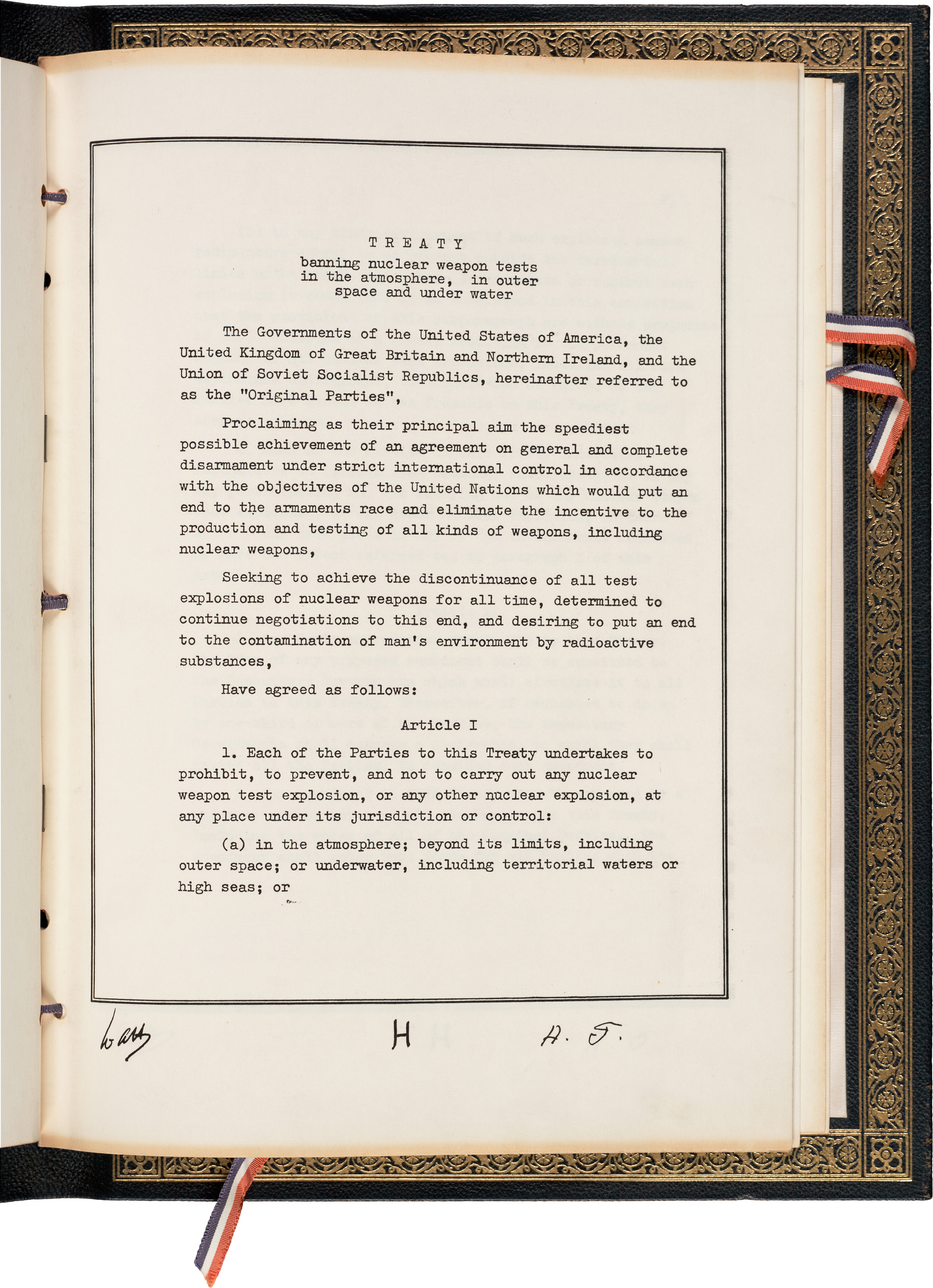
Partial Test Ban Treaty (1963), the first international space law treaty.

Space law or astrolaw is the body of law governing space-related activities, encompassing both international and domestic agreements, rules, and principles. The parameters of space law include space exploration, liability for damage, weapons use, rescue efforts, environmental preservation, information sharing, new technologies, and ethics. Other fields of law, such as administrative law, intellectual property law, arms control law, insurance law, environmental law, criminal law, and commercial law, are also integrated within space law.

The origins of space law date back to 1919, with international law recognizing each country's sovereignty over the airspace directly above their territory, later reinforced at the Chicago Convention in 1944. The onset of domestic space programs during the Cold War propelled the official creation of international space policy (i.e., the International Geophysical Year) initiated by the International Council of Scientific Unions. The Soviet Union's 1957 launch of the world's first artificial satellite, Sputnik 1, directly spurred the United States Congress to pass the Space Act, thereby establishing the National Aeronautics and Space Administration (NASA). As space exploration required crossing transnational boundaries, this era witnessed the emergence of space law as a distinct field, independent from traditional aerospace law.

Since the Cold War, the Treaty on Principles Governing the Activities of States in the Exploration and Use of Outer Space, including the Moon and Other Celestial Bodies (the "Outer Space Treaty") and the International Telecommunication Union have served as the constitutional legal framework and set of principles and procedures constituting space law. Further, the United Nations Committee on the Peaceful Uses of Outer Space (COPUOS), along with its Legal and Scientific and Technical Subcommittees, is responsible for debating issues of international space law and policy. The United Nations Office for Outer Space Affairs (UNOOSA) serves as the secretariat of the committee and promotes Access to Space for All through a wide range of conferences and capacity-building programs. Challenges that space law will continue to face in the future are fourfold—spanning across dimensions of domestic compliance, international cooperation, ethics, and the advent of scientific innovations. Furthermore, specific guidelines on the definition of airspace have yet to be universally determined.

== Early developments ==
One of the earliest works on space law was Czech jurist Vladimír Mandl's Das Weltraum-Recht: Ein Problem der Raumfahrt (Space Law: A Problem of Space Travel), written in German and published in 1932.

At Caltech in 1942 Theodore von Kármán and other rocket scientists banded together to form Aerojet rocket company with the help of lawyer Andrew G. Haley. To toast the new corporation, Kármán said, "Now, Andy, we will make the rockets—you must make the corporation and obtain the money. Later on, you will have to see that we behave well in outer space. ... After all, we are the scientists but you are the lawyer, and you must tell us how to behave ourselves according to law and to safeguard our innocence." Indeed, twenty years later, Haley published the fundamental textbook, Space Law and Government.

Beginning in 1957 with the Space Race, nations began discussing systems to ensure the peaceful use of outer space. Bilateral discussions between the United States and the USSR in 1958 resulted in the presentation of issues to the UN for debate. In 1959, the UN created the Committee on the Peaceful Uses of Outer Space (COPUOS). COPUOS in turn created two subcommittees, the Scientific and Technical Subcommittee and the Legal Subcommittee. The COPUOS Legal Subcommittee has been a primary forum for discussion and negotiation of international agreements relating to outer space.

In 1960, the International Astronautical Congress met in Stockholm and heard several submissions including a survey of legal opinion on extraterrestrial jurisdiction by Andrew G. Haley.

Starting in 1961, the General Assembly Resolution 1721 (XVI) and later 1802 (XVII), both titled "International Cooperation in the Peaceful Uses of Outer Space", and Resolution 1962 (XVIII), or a "Declaration of Legal Principles Governing the Activities of States in the Exploration and Use of Outer Space" were passed unanimously. These basic principles formed the foundation of the 1967 Outer Space Treaty.

== International treaties ==
Six international treaties have been negotiated to govern state behaviour in space:

Treaty	Official title	Year signed	Year of entry into force	Number of states parties
Partial Test Ban Treaty	Treaty Banning Nuclear Weapon Tests in the Atmosphere, in Outer Space, and Under Water	1963	1963	126
Outer Space Treaty	Treaty on Principles Governing the Activities of States in the Exploration and Use of Outer Space, including the Moon and Other Celestial Bodies	1967	1967	111
Rescue Agreement	Agreement on the Rescue of Astronauts, the Return of Astronauts and the Return of Objects Launched into Outer Space	1967	1968	98
Liability Convention	Convention on International Liability for Damage Caused by Space Objects	1972	1972	96
Registration Convention	Convention on Registration of Objects Launched into Outer Space	1974	1976	71
Moon Treaty	Agreement Governing the Activities of States on the Moon and Other Celestial Bodies	1979	1984	18

The Rescue Agreement, the Liability Convention and the Registration Convention all elaborate on provisions of the Outer Space Treaty. Some consider the Moon Treaty to be a failed treaty due to its limited acceptance. Others, however, have suggested to complement the Moon Treaty, to accommodate raised issues with it, while employing its qualities.

=== 1998 ISS agreement ===
In addition to the international treaties that have been negotiated at the United Nations, the nations participating in the International Space Station have entered into the 1998 Agreement among the governments of Canada, Member States of the European Space Agency, Japan, Russian Federation, and the United States concerning cooperation on the Civil International Space Station. This agreement provides, among other things, that NASA is the lead agency in coordinating the member states' contributions to and activities on the space station, and that each nation has jurisdiction over its own module(s). The agreement also provides for protection of intellectual property and procedures for criminal prosecution. This agreement may very well serve as a model for future agreements regarding international cooperation in facilities on the Moon and Mars, where the first off-world colonies and scientific/industrial bases are likely to be established.

== International principles and declarations ==
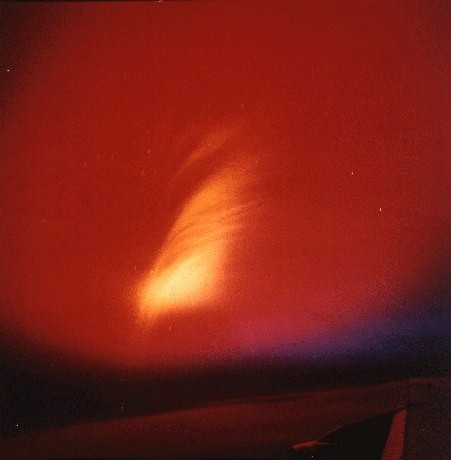
Image of Starfish Prime nuclear test in space (1962). Such tests in space and high-altitudes stopped completely with the Partial Test Ban Treaty (1963).

The five treaties and agreements of international space law cover "non-appropriation of outer space by any one country, arms control, the freedom of exploration, liability for damage caused by space objects, the safety and rescue of spacecraft and astronauts, the prevention of harmful interference with space activities and the environment, the notification and registration of space activities, scientific investigation and the exploitation of natural resources in outer space and the settlement of disputes".

The United Nations General Assembly adopted five declarations and legal principles which encourage exercising international laws, as well as unified communication between countries. The five declarations and principles are:

- The Declaration of Legal Principles Governing the Activities of States in the Exploration and Uses of Outer Space (1963)
All space exploration will be done with good intentions and is equally open to all States that comply with international law. No one nation may claim ownership of outer space or any celestial body. Activities carried out in space must abide by the international law and the nations undergoing these said activities must accept responsibility for the governmental or non-governmental agency involved. Objects launched into space are subject to their nation of belonging, including people. Objects, parts, and components discovered outside the jurisdiction of a nation will be returned upon identification. If a nation launches an object into space, they are responsible for any damages that occur internationally.

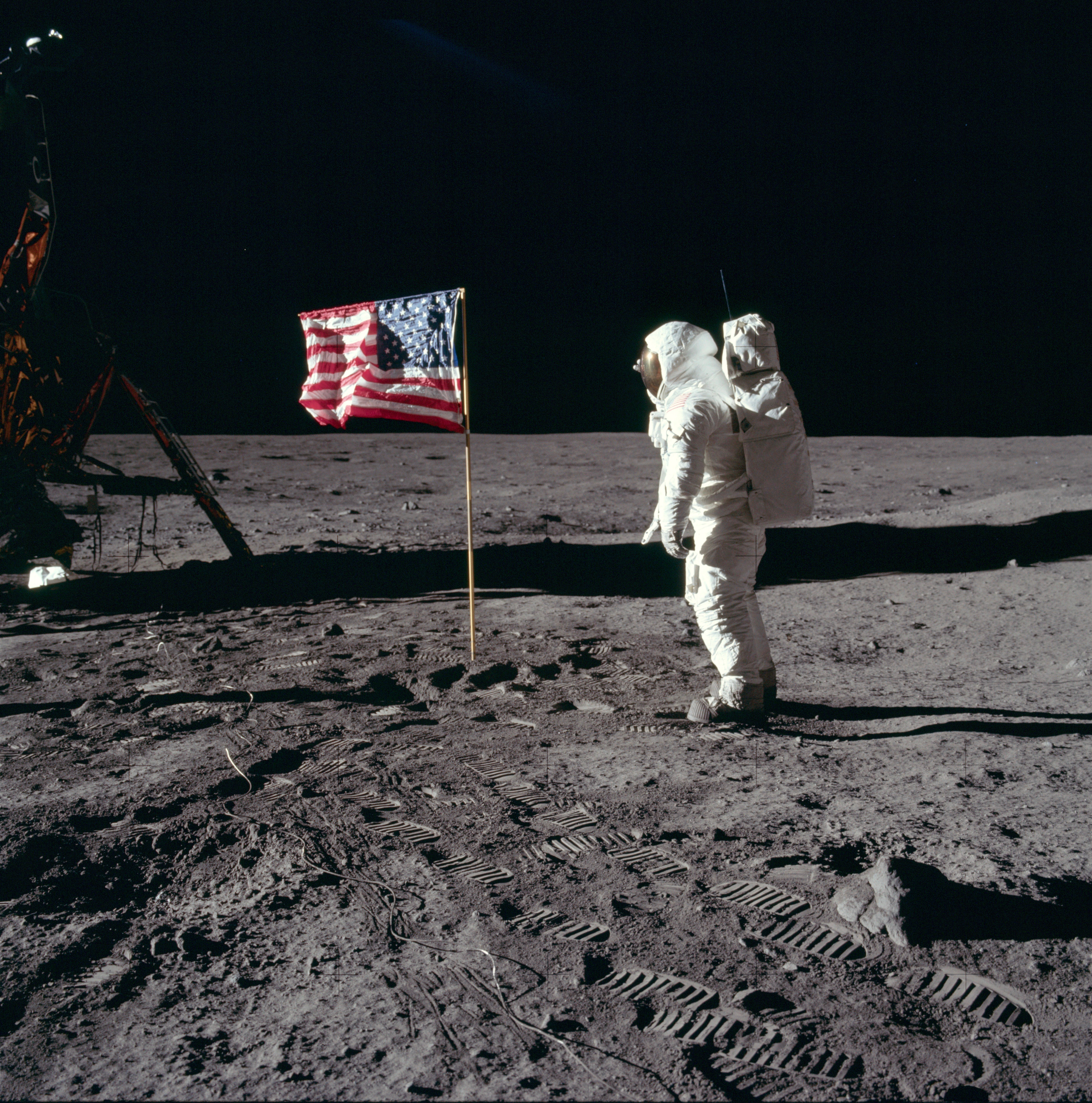
The deploying of the United States flag during the first crewed Moon landing (Apollo 11) on the lunar surface does not constitute a territorial claim, unlike historically practiced on Earth, since the US reinforced the Outer Space Treaty by adhering to it and making no such territorial claim.

- Agreement Governing the Activities of States on the Moon and Other Celestial Bodies (1979)
The agreement, also called Moon Treaty, exists to promote the exploration of outer space, but to keep the Moon and other celestial bodies in pristine conditions for the common heritage of mankind, meaning that no nation may claim sovereignty over any part of space. All countries should have equal rights to conduct research on the Moon or other celestial bodies. Weapons of mass destruction of any kind including nuclear and bases built for military purposes are specifically banned by the treaty. The United Nations resolution also states that all State Parties may conduct their enterprises below the surface of the Moon or any celestial body so long as efforts are made to protect it from contamination. All activities in space are required to be attached to a nation and any damages to other nations equipment or facilities caused by another party must be repaid in full to that nation. Any discovery of a dangerous hazard such as an area that is radioactive must notify the United Nations Secretary General and the greater international scientific community immediately.
All missions in space lasting longer than 60 days must notify the UN Secretary General and the greater scientific community every 30 days of progress. Any samples that are collected from space must be made available at earliest convenience to the scientific community. The agreement does not include meteorites that fall to Earth by natural means. Currently not a single nation that conducts its own missions in space has ratified the agreement. This likely signifies that the 'Moon Treaty is likely a failed treaty because none of the nations that actually go into space signed or ratified the agreement. That said the need for a lunar activities regulating agreement has been pointed out and proposed to be combined with a Moon Treaty clarifying Implementation Agreement.
- The Principles Governing the Use by States of Artificial Earth Satellites for International Direct Television Broadcasting (1982)
Activities of this nature must be transpired in accordance with the sovereign rights of States. Said activities should "promote the free dissemination and mutual exchange of information and knowledge in cultural and scientific fields, assist in educational, social and economic development, particularly in the developing countries, enhance the qualities of life of all peoples and provide recreation with due respect to the political and cultural integrity of States". All States have equal rights to pursue these activities and must maintain responsibility for anything carried out under their boundaries of authority. State's planning activities need to contact the Secretary-General of the United Nations with details of the undergoing activities.

- The Principles Relating to Remote Sensing of the Earth from Outer Space (1986)
Fifteen principles are stated under this category. The basic understanding comes from these descriptions given by the United Nations Office for Outer Space Affairs:
(a) The term "remote sensing" means the sensing of the Earth's surface from space by making use of the properties of electromagnetic waves emitted, reflected or: diffracted by the sensed objects, for the purpose of improving natural resources management, land use and the protection of the environment;
(b) The term "primary data" means those raw data that are acquired by remote sensors borne by a space object and that are transmitted or delivered to the ground: from space by telemetry in the form of electromagnetic signals, by photographic film, magnetic tape or any other means;
(c) The term "processed data" means the products resulting from the processing of the primary data, needed to make such data usable;
(d) The term "analyzed information" means the information resulting from the interpretation of processed data, inputs of data and knowledge from other sources;
(e) The term "remote sensing activities" means the operation of remote sensing space systems, primary data collection and storage stations, and activities in :processing, interpreting and disseminating the processed data.

- The Principles Relevant to the Use of Nuclear Power Sources in Outer Space (1992)
"States launching space objects with nuclear power sources on board shall endeavour to protect individuals, populations and the biosphere against radiological hazards. The design and use of space objects with nuclear power sources on board shall ensure, with a high degree of confidence, that the hazards, in foreseeable operational or accidental circumstances, are kept below acceptable levels. ..."

- The Declaration on International Cooperation in the Exploration and Use of Outer Space for the Benefit and in the Interest of All States, Taking into Particular Account the Needs of Developing Countries (1996)
"States are free to determine all aspects of their participation in international cooperation in the exploration and use of outer space on an equitable and mutually acceptable basis. All States, particularly those with relevant space capabilities and with programmes for the exploration and use of outer space, should contribute to promoting and fostering international cooperation on an equitable and mutually acceptable basis. In this context, particular attention should be given to the benefit for and the interests of developing countries and countries with incipient space programmes stemming from such international cooperation conducted with countries with more advanced space capabilities. International cooperation should be conducted in the modes that are considered most effective and appropriate by the countries concerned, including, inter alia, governmental and non-governmental; commercial and non-commercial; global, multilateral, regional or bilateral; and international cooperation among countries in all levels of development."

=== Province of all mankind ===
The Outer Space Treaty broadly established the concept of space being the province of all mankind, and has been discussed in comparison to the latter by the Moon Treaty invoked concept of common heritage of humanity, while overlapping concepts the latter highlights the proclaimed material nature of celestial bodies and the former the proclaimed access to the use of space.

==== Origins ====
The phrase "province of all mankind" originates in Article I of the 1967 Outer Space Treaty, which states that the exploration and use of outer space, the Moon, and other celestial bodies shall be carried out for the benefit and in the interests of all countries, irrespective of their economic or scientific development, and declares this activity to be the province of all mankind.

The treaty's preamble recalls United Nations General Assembly resolution 1962 (XVIII), the "Declaration of Legal Principles Governing the Activities of States in the Exploration and Use of Outer Space," adopted unanimously on 13 December 1963, four years before the treaty was concluded. The clause emerged during the era of the Cold War and the Space Race, when only a small number of states possessed spacefaring capability. It was intended to ensure that non-spacefaring states would still share in the benefits of space exploration, and to keep outer space beyond the reach of unilateral appropriation by the states capable of reaching it.

==== Interpretation and discourse ====
The treaty text designates the exploration and use of outer space and not outer space itself as the province of all mankind, a distinction that has generated interpretive debate over the scope of the clause. Article I provides that such exploration and use "shall be carried out for the benefit and in the interests of all countries, irrespective of their degree of economic or scientific development, and shall be the province of all mankind."

Khatwani (2019) situates the province-of-mankind clause within a broader examination of why "Common Heritage of Mankind" (CHM) terminology was later imported into space-law discourse, despite outer space already having been designated a province of mankind under the 1967 treaty. CHM developed separately, from debates over cultural heritage protection, before being extended to govern the high seas, the deep seabed, and parts of Antarctica.

Writing before the Moon Agreement's conclusion, Ogunbanwo (1975) observed that draft Moon treaty texts then under negotiation at the United Nations Committee on the Peaceful Uses of Outer Space consistently barred any right of ownership arising from the placement of stations or installations on the Moon, consistent with the Outer Space Treaty's non-appropriation principle. He noted, however, that some scholars had argued a lesser form of tenure or possessory title over the immediate area of such installations might still be necessary in practice, and that the draft texts under discussion left this question unresolved.

He further observed that a contemporaneous working group draft described the Moon's natural resources as the "common heritage of mankind," language he suggested was borrowed from parallel debates over seabed resources, and noted that no agreement had been reached within the working group on adopting that description.

During negotiation of the 1979 Moon Agreement, states diverged sharply over whether to adopt CHM language for the Moon and other celestial bodies. Khatwani recounts that the USSR opposed CHM terminology on the ground that "heritage" is a term drawn from civil law and was therefore inapposite for something already recognized as the common province of mankind, a position suggesting that "province" and "heritage" were understood, at least by some states, as conceptually distinct. The compromise ultimately adopted, based on an Austrian proposal, framed the resulting CHM principle around the safe and rational management of lunar resources through an international regime, rather than around ownership or property rights.

While Craven in 2019 argued that the law of outer space, as it developed through the 1960s and 1970s, configured outer space as a "commons" in order to displace two Cold War anxieties: that space might become a site of warfare, or an object of "primitive accumulation" by the states capable of reaching it. Drawing on the work of Herbert Marcuse, Craven contends that this occurred through a particular "technological rationality," in which each anxiety was repressed yet reappeared as a structuring feature of the resulting legal order.

== Consensus ==
The United Nations Committee on the Peaceful Uses of Outer Space and its Scientific and Technical and Legal Subcommittees operate on the basis of consensus, i.e., all delegations from member States must agree on any matter, be it treaty language before it can be included in the final version of a treaty or new items on Committee/Subcommittee's agendas. One reason that the U.N. space treaties lack definitions and are unclear in other respects, is that it is easier to achieve consensus when language and terms are vague. In recent years, the Legal Subcommittee has been unable to achieve consensus on discussion of a new comprehensive space agreement (the idea of which, though, was proposed just by a few member States). It is also unlikely that the Subcommittee will be able to agree to amend the Outer Space Treaty in the foreseeable future. A number of space faring nations seem to believe that discussing a new space agreement or amendment of the Outer Space Treaty would be futile and time-consuming, because entrenched differences regarding resource appropriation, property rights and other issues relating to commercial activity make consensus unlikely.

== National law ==
Space law also encompasses national laws, and multiple countries have passed national space legislation in recent years. The Outer Space Treaty gives responsibility for regulating space activities, including both government and private sector, to the individual countries where the activity is taking place. If a national of, or an organization incorporated in one country launches a spacecraft in a different country, interpretations differ as to whether the home country or the launching country has jurisdiction.

The Outer Space Treaty also incorporates the UN Charter by reference, and requires parties to ensure that activities are conducted in accordance with other forms of international law such as customary international law (the custom and practice of states).

The advent of commercial activities like space mining, space tourism, private exploration, and the development of multiple commercial spaceports, is leading a number of countries to consider how to regulate private space activities. The challenge is to regulate these activities in a manner that does not hinder or preclude investment, while still ensuring that commercial activities comply with international law. Developing nations are concerned that the spacefaring nations will monopolize space resources. Royalties paid to developing countries is one reason the United States has not ratified the United Nations Convention on the Law of the Sea, and why some oppose applying the same principles to outer space.

Several nations have enacted or recently updated their national space law, for example, Luxembourg in 2017, the United States in 2015, and Japan in 2008. Due to the expansion of the domain of space research and allied activities in India, the draft Space Activities Bill was introduced in 2017.

== Issues ==
=== Defining "space" ===
Many questions arise from the difficulty of defining the term "space". Scholars not only debate its geographical definition (i.e., upper and lower limits), but also whether or not it also encompasses various objects within it (i.e., celestial objects, human beings, man-made devices). Lower limits are generally estimated to be about 50 kilometers. More difficulties arise trying to define the upper bounds of "space", as it would require more inquiry into the nature of the universe and the role of Earth as a planet.

=== Geostationary orbit allocation ===
Source: Own work, Earth bitmap is File:North_pole_february_ice-pack_1978-2002.png by Geo Swan. Creative Commons Attribution-Share Alike 3.0 Unported license. (No changes made.)

==== Allocative limitations ====
Objects in geostationary orbits remain stationary over a point on the Earth due to moving at the same angular velocity as the Earth's surface. There are a number of advantages in being able to use these orbits, mostly due to the unique ability to send radio frequencies to and from satellites to collect data and send signals to various locations. The United Nations Committee on the Peaceful Uses of Outer Space has approved seven nonmilitary uses for these orbits: communications, meteorology, Earth's resources and environment, navigation and aircraft control, testing of new systems, astronomy, and data relay. The requirement to space these satellites apart means that there is a limited number of orbital "slots" available, thus only a limited number of satellites can be placed in geostationary orbit. This has led to conflict between different countries wishing access to the same orbital slots (countries at the same longitude but differing latitudes). These disputes are addressed through the ITU allocation mechanism.

Countries located at the Earth's equator have also asserted their legal claim to control the use of space above their territory, notably in 1976, when some countries located at the Earth's equator created the Bogota Declaration, in which they asserted their legal claim to control the use of space above their territory, but failed to challenge the Outer Space Treaty in this regard.

==== Political controversy ====
Future developments using geostationary orbits may include an expansion of services in telecommunication, broadcasting, and meteorology. As a result, uses for geostationary orbits may stir political controversy. For example, broadcasting and telecommunication services of satellites orbiting above Earth from certain nations may accidentally "spill over" into other nations' territory. This may prompt conflict with nations that wish to restrict access to information and communication. Current and future political and legal concerns allocation may pose may be addressed by international legislatures, such as the United Nations Committee on the Peaceful Uses of Outer Space and the International Telecommunication Union.

=== Environmental protection ===
More recent discussions focus on the need for the international community to draft and institute a code of space ethics to prevent the destruction of the space environment. Furthermore, the advancement of life in space pertain to questions related to the ethics of biocentrism and anthropocentrism, or in other words, determining how much value we place in all living things versus human beings specifically. Currently, researchers in the bioengineering field are working towards contamination control measures integrated into spacecraft to protect both space and earth's biosphere.

==== Environmental space governance ====
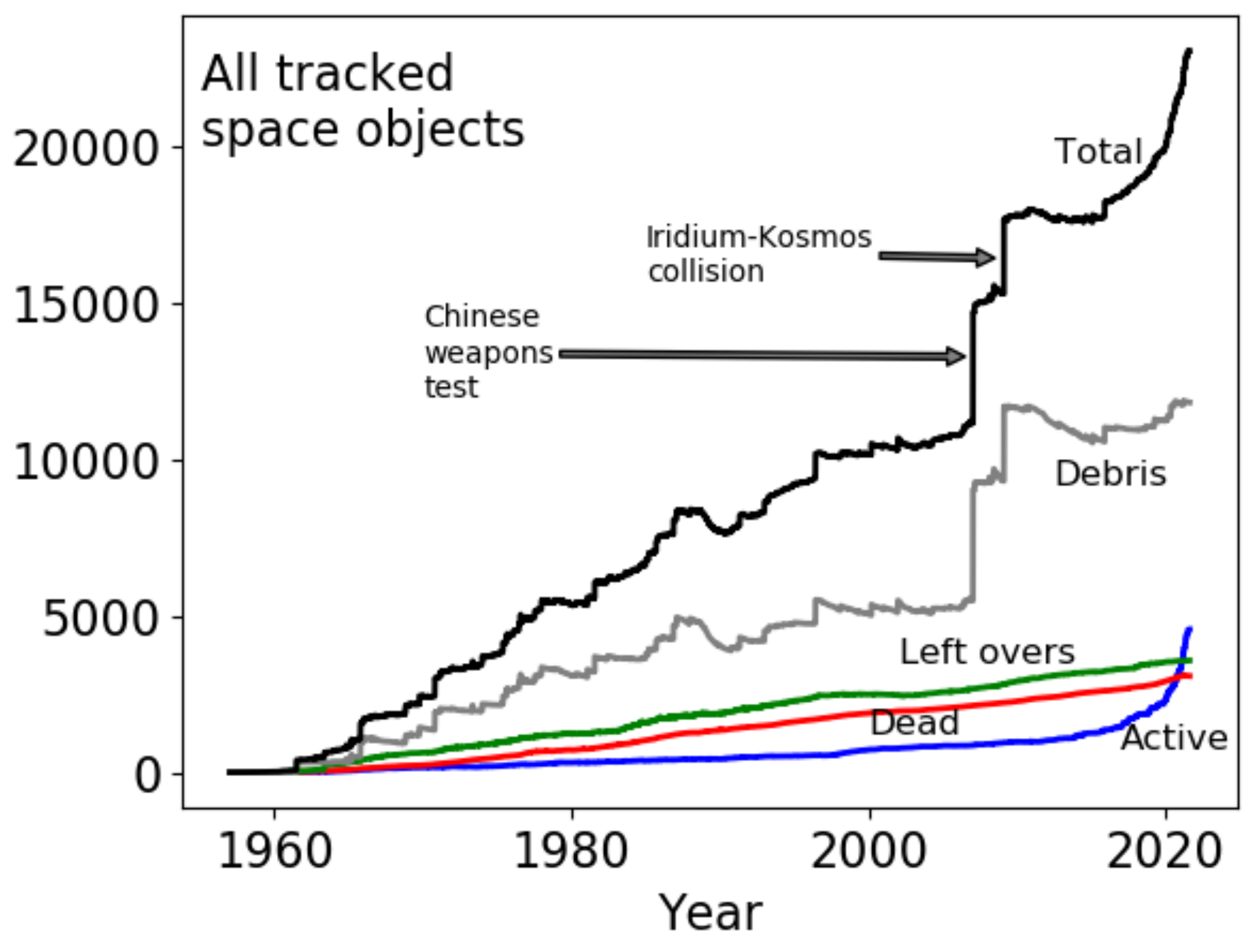
The growth of all tracked objects in space over time showing a recent increase of active satellites

UN Guidelines and ISO standard 24113 on space debris mitigation "encourages" organizations to voluntarily:

- Limit debris released during normal operations
- Minimize the potential for on-orbit break-ups
- Post-mission disposal
- Prevention of on-orbit collisions

A study suggests policies could help achieve the goal of debris mitigation and space sustainability. A team of scientists outlined rationale for governance that regulates the current free externalization of true costs and risks, treating orbital space around the Earth as an "additional ecosystem" or a common "part of the human environment" which should be subject to the same concerns and regulations like e.g. oceans on Earth. The study concludes that it needs "new policies, rules and regulations at national and international level".

As of 2022, global space activity is not sufficiently shaped by any international entity, and therefore "there is no common set of rules that govern global space activity and no mechanisms to ensure the proper disposal of hardware at the completion of space missions. Nor is there any coordinated effort to clean up the decades of space debris already accumulated in orbit."

Beyond space debris, rocket launches and the re-entry of reusable components and space debris also cause air pollution. A study estimated their impacts on climate change and the ozone layer in 2019 and from a theoretical future space industry extrapolated from the "billionaire space race". It concludes that substantial effects from routine space tourism should "motivate regulation".

=== Space Heritage protection ===
Space Heritage can be understood to mean traces of human existence, together with their archaeological and natural contexts that occur in outer space, including on the Moon and other celestial bodies. Conceptually, this definition can be interpreted to include any human-made material in space and as humanity continues to increase the pace of exploratory and commercial missions to the Moon and beyond. Thus, protocols must be established to manage Space Heritage for two different reasons: first so that relevant cultural heritage, which is so important to build kinship amongst humans, is preserved; and second to assure that the concept of heritage is not abused by national space actors.

Human heritage in outer space includes Tranquility Base (Apollo 11's lunar landing site) and the robotic and crewed sites that preceded and followed Apollo 11. This also comprises all the Luna programme vehicles, including the Luna 2 (first object) and Luna 9 (first soft-landing) missions, the Surveyor program and the Yutu rovers.

Human heritage in outer space also includes satellites like Vanguard 1 and Asterix-1 which, though nonoperational, remain in orbit.

Currently, these sites are not recognized as cultural heritage or protected in any way under international law. They are addressed in Section 9 of the Artemis Accords which includes an agreement to preserve outer space heritage, which they consider to comprise historically significant human or robotic landing sites, artifacts, spacecraft, and other evidence of activity, and to contribute to multinational efforts to develop practices and rules to do so.

=== Sovereignty ===
Current space law has framed space as a common good by calling it the "province of all mankind", and no state has claimed any part of space as their territory, despite practicing the placing of flags. That said it has been argued, that sovereignty is an issue through jurisdiction, which applies to installed facilities and the present actors in space.

=== Ethics ===
In space law, ethics extend to topics regarding space exploration, space tourism, space ownership, the militarization of space, environmental protection, and distinguishing the boundaries of space itself. In March 2023, For All Moonkind announced the formation of the Institute on Space Law and Ethics, a "new nonprofit organization will go beyond advocating for protecting off-world heritage sites and contemplate the ethics around some activities in space that are not fully covered in existing international law."

=== Interplanetary Human Rights ===
International space law developed after the Second World War when international human rights were established, but both developed independently, and have therefore been identified to be in need to be thought together and expanded, especially with advancing space flight and interest in space settlement.

It has been suggested that human rights need to be accompanied in space by a set of fundamental rights. Approached from Crip Legal Theory, the following three such novel fundamental rights have been suggested by the Jus Ad Astra project: the right to water, the right to a breathable atmosphere and the right to a habitable environment.

For such rights state and private accountability has become, particular in light of increased private space activity, a growing issue.

=== Human representation, participation and colonialism ===
The issue of human representation and participation in space has been a focus of international space law since the beginning of space exploration.

In the early stages of international space law, outer space was framed as res communis, explicitly not as terra nullius, in the Magna Carta of Space presented by William A. Hyman in 1966. This concept has since influenced the work of the United Nations Committee on the Peaceful Uses of Outer Space, and the exploration and use of outer space has been declared as the "province of all mankind".

Critics though argue that the sharing of space for all humanity is still lacking, with imperialist views prevailing. Moreover, there are concerns that the current politico-legal regimes and their philosophical underpinnings may favor the imperialist development of space. Consequently, it has been argued that space law is in the need for being reevaluated to ensure the consideration of the relevance and contributions of countries without significant spaceflight, particularly as an answer to colonial histories and colonialism.

Space colonization has been criticized as a continuation of imperialism and colonialism, leading to postcolonial critiques of colonial decision-making and reasons for labor and land exploitation. There is a growing recognition of the need for inclusive and democratic participation in any space exploration, infrastructure, or habitation. Despite the Outer Space Treaty guaranteeing access to space, space law has faced criticism for not securing international and social inclusiveness, particularly concerning private spaceflight. The often heard declaration that humanity's destiny lies in colonizing the Solar System, particularly in the "billionaire space race", leaving multiple earthbound problems behind has been criticized as "techno-utopian [...] hubris", suggesting "a multilateral agreement to strictly govern and limit expansion into space".

=== Commercial use ===
Early discussions regarding space ethics revolved around whether or not the space frontier should be available for use, gaining prominence at the time of the Soviet Union and the United States' Space Race. In 1967, the "Outer Space Treaty" dictated that all nations in compliance with international regulation are permitted to exploit space. As a result, the commercial use of space is open to exploitation by public and private entities, especially in relation to mining and space tourism. This principle has been the subject of controversy, particularly by those in favor of environmental protection, sustainability, and conservation.

=== Exploitation ===
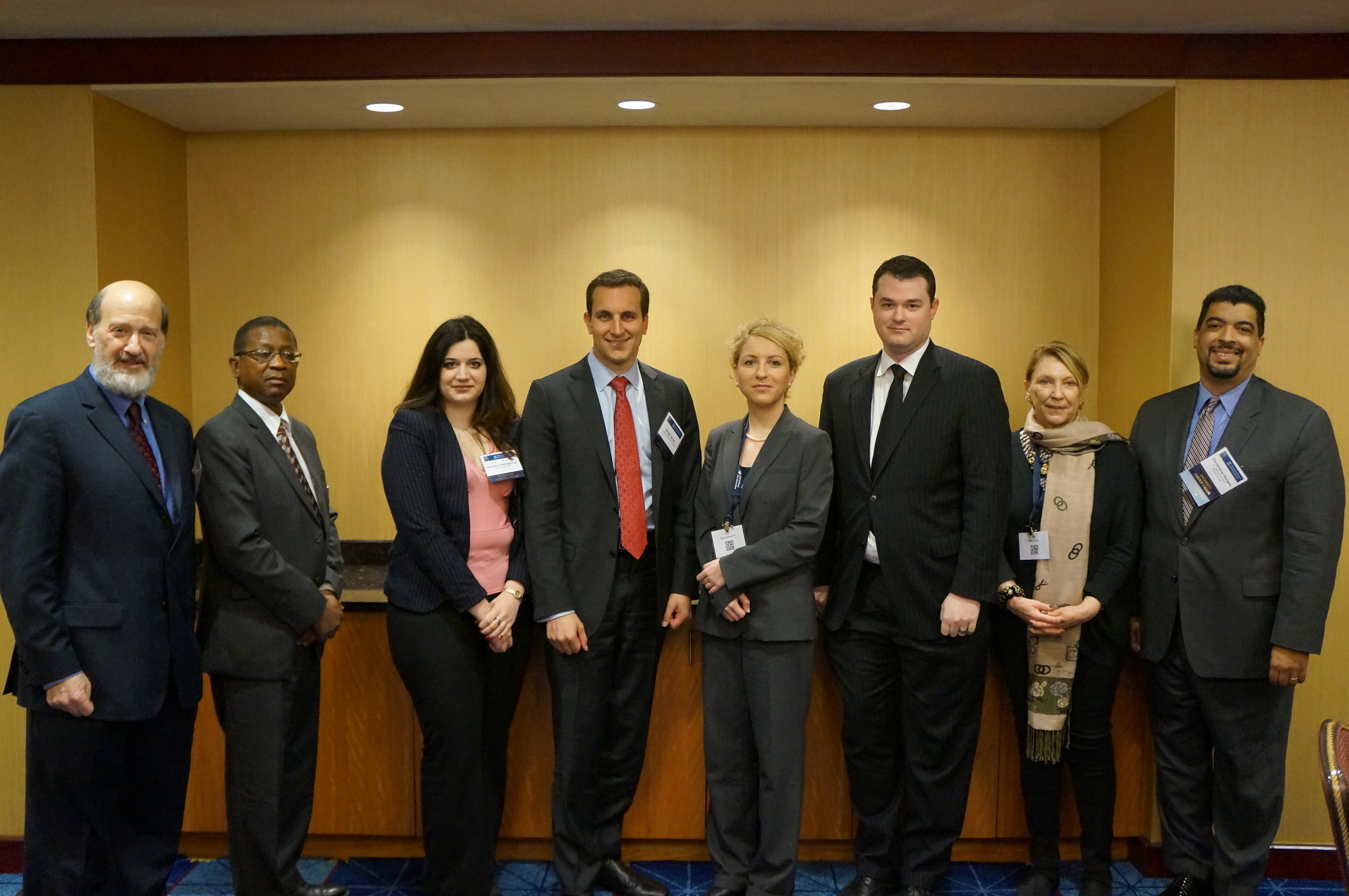
American Society of International Law Space Interest Group 2014 Board meeting

While this field of the law is still in its infancy, it is in an era of rapid change and development. Arguably, the resources of space are infinite. If commercial space transportation becomes widely available, with substantially lower launch costs, then all countries will be able to directly reap the benefits of space resources. In that situation, it seems likely that consensus will be much easier to achieve with respect to commercial development and human settlement of outer space. High costs are not the only factor preventing the economic exploitation of space: it is argued that space should be considered as a pristine environment worthy of protection and conservation, and that the legal regime for space should further protect it from being used as a resource for Earth's needs. Debate is also focused on whether space should continue to be legally defined as part of the "Common heritage of mankind", and therefore unavailable for national claims, or whether its legal definition should be changed to allow private property in space.

As of 2013, NASA's plans to capture an asteroid by 2021 has raised questions about how space law would be applied in practice.

In 2016, the nation of Luxembourg has set out a formal legal framework which ensures that private companies engaged in mining resources in space have rights to those resources.

=== Anthropocentrisms ===
Spreading humanity's influence far beyond the Earth raises questions about potential other intelligences that have spread through reachable space. Astroethics can consider extraterrestrial having ethics, which may often reflect in laws and understand humanity and its multitude of ethics (which may often reflect in laws and policies) as a part of the universe in a more holistic, possibly even "cosmic", view.

=== Spacefaring machines ===
Progress in robotics and artificial intelligence is eroding the need for humans in space with human endeavours often being less cost-effective than robotic missions, with ethical implications for society. Laws as well as adaption-requirements for humans differ in space, which could be a legitimation for crewed – rather than robotic – space-missions.

=== Contact regime ===
There have been some proposals as with the Magna Carta of Space presented by William A. Hyman in 1966 or through the concept of metalaw to introduce legal basics in case of detection of or contact with indigenous extraterrestrial intelligence. As of 2018, there are basically no principles for dealing with a successful confirmed SETI detection.

=== Rights of nature ===
In 2021, the Declaration of the Rights of the Moon was created by a group of "lawyers, space archaeologists and concerned citizens", drawing on precedents in the Rights of Nature movement and the concept of legal personality for non-human entities in space.

== Dispute resolution ==
Space Law also attempts to provide a framework for dispute resolution for matters which arise in space. The following mechanisms are available to the different types of affected parties.

=== State Actors ===
- State actors can choose to bring a case before the International Court of Justice for breaches under the Liability Convention or the Outer Space Treaty. Strong arguments can also be made for breaches of customary international law.
- Alternatively, state actors can also attempt to resolve disputes between themselves and reach a negotiated settlement. This was the case in the Kosmos 954 incident between Canada and the USSR.

=== Non-State Actors ===
Non-state actors are first directed to approach an appropriate state party where one is involved as per the Liability Convention. Where the dispute is private and commercial in nature however, some private companies opt for arbitration. So far, arbitration has primarily been conducted under the Permanent Court of Arbitration under the 1976 UNCITRAL Arbitration Rules but the existence of the more specialised "Optional Rules for Arbitration of Disputes Relating to Outer Space Activities" might see a shift in procedural law chosen by the parties in the future. Examples of disputes resolved by arbitration include the cases of CC/Devas (Mauritius) Ltd., Devas Employees Mauritius Private Ltd., & Telcom Devas Mauritius Ltd. v. Republic of India, PCA Case No. 2013-09 and Deutsche Telekom AG v. The Republic of India, PCA Case No. 2014-10.

Beside arbitration there is also the possibility of a Claims Commission as outlined in the Liability Convention. Altogether arbitration has been discussed as an emerging or active field.

== Future institutional developments ==
=== Open-Ended Working Group (OEWG) on Space Threats ===
With no progress in the negotiation of the Prevention of an Arms Race in Outer Space in 2020, the UN resolution "Reducing Space Threats Through Norms, Rules and Principles of Responsible Behaviours" was signed. Subsequently, the "Open Ended Working Group on Reducing Space Threats Through Norms, Rules and Principles of Responsible Behaviours" was established and found some traction, particularly since the 2022 Russian invasion of Ukraine.

=== Future coordination and cooperation ===
International coordination and cooperation are facilitated by the growing inter-agency International Space Exploration Coordination Group and planned for the Lunar Gateway space station, emulating the cooperation for the ISS.

=== Legal Profession ===
There is a growing emphasis on space law in academia. Since 1951, the McGill Faculty of Law in Montreal, Canada has hosted the Institute of Air and Space Law, and offers an LL.M. in Air and Space law. The University of Mississippi School of Law publishes the world's only law journal devoted to space law, the Journal of Space Law. The University of Mississippi School of Law is also the only ABA-accredited law school in the world to offer an LL.M. in Air and Space Law, a Graduate Certificate and a JD Concentration in Air and Space Law. Michelle Hanlon serves as the executive director of the Center for Air and Space Law at the university. In 2008, the University of Nebraska College of Law launched its space, cyber, and telecommunications law program, offering courses and specializations to JD students and an LL.M. in Space, Cyber, and Telecommunications. Over the last decade, other universities have begun to offer specialized courses and programs in the US, UK, France, the Netherlands, and Australia.

In September 2012, the Space Law Society (SLS) at the University of Maryland Francis King Carey School of Law was established. A legal resources team united in Maryland, a "Space Science State", with Jorge Rodriguez, Lee Sampson, Patrick Gardiner, Lyra Correa and Juliana Neelbauer as SLS founding members. In 2014, students at American University Washington College of Law founded the school's Space Law Society, with the help of Pamela L. Meredith, space lawyer and adjunct professor of Satellite Communications and Space Law.

Efforts to codify the legal regime are mostly represented in the Manual on International Law Applicable to Military Uses of Outer Space (MILAMOS) and the Woomera Manual. The Woomera Manual is a collaborative effort between the University of Adelaide, UNSW Canberra, the University of Exeter, and the University of Nebraska College of Law. Like the San Remo and Tallinn Manuals, the goal is to clarify the law as it relates to outer space.

In 2018, two space lawyers - Christopher Hearsey and Nathan Johnson - founded the Space Court Foundation, a 501(c)(3) educational nonprofit corporation that promotes and supports space law and policy education and the rule of law. The Space Court Foundation produces educational materials and scholarships through the administration of two major projects: Stellar Decisis and the Space Court Law Library. The foundation engages in partnerships and collaborations that help grow greater awareness of space law and how disputes in space may be resolved as humans venture farther from Earth in the not-too-distant future.

=== International efforts to inform progressive development of International Space Law ===
The McGill Institute of Air and Space Law is leading multiple international collaborative projects to contribute towards clarifying international space law and promote rules-based global order. One such project announced in 2017, being led by Prof. Ram S. Jakhu, is the McGill Manual on International Law Applicable to Military Uses of Outer Space (MILAMOS Project) which aims to clarify existing rules of international law as they apply to military uses of outer space. The MILAMOS Project aims to contribute to "a future where all space activities are conducted in accordance with the international rules-based global order, without disrupting, and preferably contributing to, the sustainable use of outer space for the benefit of present and future generations of all humanity." Another international collaborative project announced in 2020, being led by Prof. Ram S. Jakhu, Bayar Goswami and Kuan-Wei (David) Chen, is the McGill Encyclopedia of International Space Law (at SpaceLawPedia.com) which aims to "fulfill the need for an objectively curated online resource on key subject matters of international space law. With the input of a team of global practitioners and academics in the field of international space law and general international law, the SpaceLawPedia aims to be the definitive source of peer-reviewed reference material for anyone practicing, conducting research on or teaching international space law."

For a deeper awareness and understanding of issues arising from the ongoing scramble for the Moon, the Open Lunar Foundation has been working with a broad range of professionals to find, in an open and responsible way, approaches which find and address issues. This work has produced the "Lunar Policy Handbook" under its "Moon Dialogs" program, the lunar activity registry proposal "Bright Moon", and a program for approaches for resource collection called "Breaking Ground".

=== Global space agency ===
International context can be traced all the way back to the International Geophysical Year in the course of which the first orbital flight was conducted, and early work on establishing international cooperation in space. Even a joint US-USSR space program was actively for a short time negotiated. Today's international space laws are the most remaining remnants of these early advances in space cooperation.

The end of the Cold War was presented as an opportunity, allowing today's International Space Station and fueling academic suggestions like an "interspace" design for the establishment of an international space agency. With increased space environmental awareness a "Framework Convention on the Protection of the Space Environment" and yet again an "International Space Agency" has been academically suggested, while having seen practically no advances. Despite the absence of an international space agency, international cooperation in space is being widely pursued, with the Committee on the Peaceful Uses of Outer Space (COPUOS) and International Space Exploration Coordination Group (ISECG) being the most high-level coordination groups, the latter produces the Global Exploration Roadmap.

== Table of United States Space Laws ==
Major United States Space Legislation, Directives, and Program Frameworks
Year	Event / Act / Directive	Citation / Authority	Primary Purpose & Impact on Launch Vehicles
1958	National Aeronautics and Space Act	51 U.S.C. § 20101 et seq.	Established NASA and declared that U.S. space activities should be devoted to peaceful purposes. Created the framework for civil aeronautics and space research.
1961	Presidential Address to Joint Session of Congress	President John F. Kennedy	The catalyst for the Apollo program. JFK declared the national goal of landing a man on the Moon and returning him safely to Earth before the decade was out, triggering unprecedented federal funding and development for the Saturn V launch vehicle.
1962	Communications Satellite Act of 1962	47 U.S.C. § 701 et seq.	Regulated the commercialization of satellite communications, leading to the creation of COMSAT and establishing early oversight protocols for payload launches.
1967	Outer Space Treaty	18 UST 2410	Ratified by the U.S. Senate. Forms the foundational legal baseline for all U.S. space laws; bans weapons of mass destruction in orbit and dictates that celestial bodies can only be used for peaceful purposes.
1984	Commercial Space Launch Act of 1984	51 U.S.C. § 50901 et seq.	The foundation of private spaceflight regulation. Authorized the Department of Transportation (now delegated to the FAA's Office of Commercial Space Transportation) to license commercial rocket launches and launch sites.
1984	Land Remote-Sensing Commercialization Act of 1984	51 U.S.C. § 60101 et seq.	Established a system for the commercialization of satellite imagery and civilian remote-sensing systems, creating a framework for licensing private Earth-imaging systems via the Department of Commerce.
1990	Launch Services Purchase Act of 1990	P.L. 101-611, Title II	Mandated that NASA purchase commercial launch services from private U.S. providers whenever feasible, fundamentally spurring competitive growth in the private launch vehicle industry.
1998	Commercial Space Act of 1998	51 U.S.C. § 50101 et seq.	Encouraged the development of a commercial space industry, specifically creating licensing frameworks for commercial re-entry vehicles and looking forward to the commercialization of the International Space Station.
2004	Commercial Space Launch Amendments Act of 2004	P.L. 108-492	Established a regulatory framework for human spaceflight, defining "space flight participants" and allowing a "learning period" that restricted the FAA from enacting overly burdensome safety regulations on experimental commercial passenger vehicles.
2015	Commercial Space Launch Competitiveness Act of 2015 (SPACE Act)	P.L. 114-90	Extended third-party liability indemnification for commercial launches, prolonged the FAA regulatory "learning period," and legally granted U.S. citizens and corporations ownership over resources they extract from asteroids or the Moon.
2017	NASA Transition Authorization Act of 2017	P.L. 115-10	Reaffirmed deep-space human exploration targets, codified support for the private launch sector, and enacted the TREAT Astronauts Act to provide lifetime medical monitoring for crew members.
2017	Space Policy Directive 1 (SPD-1)	Presidential Memorandum	Amending the 2010 National Space Policy, this directive officially shifted NASA's focus back to a human return to the Moon. It authorized the lunar campaign later branded as the Artemis program, combining government systems (SLS and Orion) with private industry architectures.
2019	National Defense Authorization Act for Fiscal Year 2020	P.L. 116-92	Created the United States Space Force (USSF) as an independent military branch under the Department of the Air Force, reshaping military launch vehicle acquisition and national space defense infrastructure.
2020	Artemis Accords	International Framework	A U.S.-led international framework (co-drafted by NASA and the State Department) establishing principles for peaceful, transparent cooperation and space resource utilization. Governs international partner integration for Artemis lunar surface operations.
2022	NASA Authorization Act of 2022	P.L. 117-167 (CHIPS Act Title VII)	Codified statutory congressional support for the Artemis program into federal law, formalizing the Moon-to-Mars strategy and ensuring long-term funding streams for heavy-lift launch infrastructure.
2025	One Big Beautiful Bill Act	P.L. 119-21	Provided $9.9 billion in supplemental NASA funding, mandating $4.1 billion specifically to preserve the Space Launch System (SLS) heavy-lift architecture and $2.6 billion for the Gateway lunar space station. It legally restricted NASA from off-ramping or defunding the SLS framework until commercial alternatives prove equivalent heavy-lift capabilities, and established a commercial space launch and reentry user fee framework under the FAA.

== See also ==
- Artemis Accords
- Common heritage of mankind
- Science-based legislation
- Science-based policy
- Politics of outer space
- Ernst Fasan
- Institute of Space and Telecommunications Law
- Metalaw
- Moon Treaty
- NewSpace
- Outer Space Treaty
- Politics of the International Space Station
- Space advocacy
- Space archaeology, the law as related to preserving cultural heritage from space sites
- Space policy
- Title 51 of the United States Code
- Space traffic management
