= Wolf Amendment =

United States federal law

The Wolf Amendment is a law passed by the United States Congress in 2011, named after Representative Frank Wolf, that prohibits the National Aeronautics and Space Administration (NASA) from using government funds to engage in direct, bilateral cooperation with the Chinese government and China-affiliated organizations from its activities without explicit authorization from the Federal Bureau of Investigation and Congress. It has been inserted annually into appropriations bills since then.

== History ==
In May 1999, the Report of the Select Committee on U.S. National Security and Military/Commercial Concerns with the People's Republic of China was made public. It is alleged that, following decades of intelligence operations against U.S. weapons laboratories conducted by the Ministry of State Security, China stole design information regarding advanced thermonuclear weapons. Furthermore, technical information provided by American commercial satellite manufacturers to China in connection with satellite launches could have been used to improve Chinese intercontinental ballistic missile technology.

In 2010, Rep. John Culberson urged President Barack Obama not to allow further contact between NASA and the China National Space Administration (CNSA). In a letter addressed to the President, he wrote:

I have grave concerns about the nature and goals of China's space program and strongly oppose any cooperation between NASA and CNSA's human space flight programs without Congressional authorization.

In April 2011, the 112th United States Congress barred NASA from engaging in bilateral agreements and coordination with China. As stated under Public Law 112–10, Sec. 1340:

(a) None of the funds made available by this division may be used for the National Aeronautics and Space Administration or the Office of Science and Technology Policy to develop, design, plan, promulgate, implement, or execute a bilateral policy, program, order, or contract of any kind to participate, collaborate, or coordinate bilaterally in any way with China or any Chinese-owned company unless such activities are specifically authorized by a law enacted after the date of enactment of this division. (b) The limitation in subsection (a) shall also apply to any funds used to effectuate the hosting of official Chinese visitors at facilities belonging to or utilized by the National Aeronautics and Space Administration.

== Effects ==
In 2013, officials at NASA Ames prohibited Chinese nationals from attending Kepler Science Conference II. A number of American scientists boycotted the meeting in protest of this prohibition, with senior academics either withdrawing individually or pulling out their entire research groups. Rep. Frank Wolf wrote a letter to NASA Administrator Charlie Bolden, saying that the restriction only applied to bilateral meetings and activities between NASA and the Chinese government or Chinese-owned companies, whereas Kepler Science Conference II is a multilateral event. NASA later reversed the ban and admitted a mistake in barring individual Chinese nationals who did not represent their government in official capacity.

During China's 2019 Chang'e 4 mission, NASA collaborated with China to monitor the moon lander and Yutu 2 rover on the lunar far-side using NASA's Lunar Reconnaissance Orbiter. NASA was able to do so by getting congressional approval for the specific interaction and sharing data with researchers globally. NASA stated:

The statutory prohibition on NASA’s use of appropriated funds for bilateral cooperation with China…does not apply to activities that NASA has certified to Congress, [which] do not pose a risk of resulting in the transfer of technology, data or other information with national security or economic security implications to China; and that do not involve knowing interactions with officials who have been determined by the U.S. to have direct involvement with violations of human rights. In accordance with the law, NASA made the appropriate certification to Congress for this activity.

With the return of the Chang'e-6 lunar mission on June 25, 2024, China acquired rocks and soil from the far side of the Moon, a historic milestone with the potential to revolutionize understanding of the Moon's evolution and its capacity to support human life. The China National Space Administration (CNSA) announced that it would share these lunar samples with scientists worldwide, following the precedent set by NASA after the Apollo missions. However, according to an article from Futurism, US scientists will be largely barred from participating in the analysis of these samples because of the Wolf Amendment, unless NASA first receives certification from the FBI, proving that there are no national security threats. Currently NASA is consulting with legal experts to explore the possible avenues for collaboration with China to analyze the lunar samples, while adhering to the existing legal framework.

== Status ==
Fiscal Year	Act	Law	Section	Date Passed
2011	DEPARTMENT OF DEFENSE AND FULL-YEAR CONTINUING APPROPRIATIONS ACT	112-10	1340	2011-04-15
2022	Consolidated Appropriations Act	117-103	526	2022-03-15

== Criticism ==
Dean Cheng from The Heritage Foundation argued in April 2014 that more interaction with the Chinese is possible in the area of sharing already collected data, and that sharing data such as Geodesy information and lunar conditions may "help create a pattern of interaction that might lower some of the barriers to information exchange." Sir Martin Rees, the fifteenth Astronomer Royal of Great Britain, has called the ban a "deplorable 'own goal' by the US".

The Chinese response to the exclusion policy involved its own space policy of opening up its space station to the outside world, welcoming scientists coming from all countries.

The quarterly published international relations journal Harvard International Review noted that "while proponents of the amendment claim that it reduces the risk of a US–China war in space, the amendment proves contrary to its own intentions and actually increases the risk of war in space."

The Washington-based Center for Strategic and International Studies criticized the act, suggesting that it wasn't able to achieve the desired effect on China. Instead, it accelerated China's space autonomy and parallel technological development, and argued that collaborating with non-aligned nations, such as Apollo-Soyuz and the Shuttle-Mir, has set precedents.

== See also ==
- Politics of the International Space Station
- Space advocacy
- Space law
- Space policy
