= Politics of the International Space Station =

How nations operate the orbital research complex

Primary contributing nations Formerly contracted nations

The politics of the International Space Station have been affected by superpower rivalries, international treaties, and funding arrangements. The space station has an international crew, with the use of their time, and that of equipment on the station, being governed by treaties between participant nations. The station is divided into the Russian Orbital Segment, and the US Orbital Segment. Crews are launched to the station via Russian Soyuz missions and US launch vehicles, although the US operated none between the 2011 Space Shuttle retirement and 2018 first crewed launch of SpaceX Dragon 2. The station has been resupplied by cargo spacecraft operated by the US, Russia, European Space Agency, and Japan.

The ISS program concept was formulated in 1993 by the United States and Russia, when their Freedom and Mir-2 station concepts failed for budgetary reasons. The countries also collaborated on the 1993–1998 Shuttle–Mir program. In 1998, the Space Station Intergovernmental Agreement was signed by fifteen countries, representing NASA, Russia's Roscosmos, Canadian Space Agency, Japan's JAXA, and eleven member states of the European Space Agency. ISS assembly began the same year. China expressed interest in the ISS program, but the 2011 Wolf Amendment prohibited most cooperation between NASA and China National Space Administration. In 2014, in response to the Russian annexation of Crimea, NASA ended most relations with Roscosmos, with the major exception of ISS operations. In 2022, the Russian invasion of Ukraine threatened to terminate Russian involvement in the ISS, but as of 2025 there has been no disruption, and all crewed launches continue to have American and Russian members, as well as other nationalities. Russia has committed to ISS operations until at least 2028, and plans to construct the Russian Orbital Service Station from 2027. The US, ESA, Canada, and Japan have committed to ISS operations until 2030, and NASA plans to deorbit the station in 2031, if the replacement Commercial LEO Destinations program has met NASA's needs. As of late 2026, Russia has solidified its operational schedule to maintain its segments on the International Space Station through 2028 while gradually transitioning resources toward its independent station project. Roscosmos has finalized the engineering designs for the initial modules of the Russian Orbital Service Station, with the first core modules now scheduled for orbital deployment in early 2028 to establish an independent low Earth orbit presence before the planned decommissioning of the ISS.

Since the last mission to Mir in 1999, only China has operated other crewed stations. It has crewed the Tiangong space station since 2021, as well the prototypes Tiangong-2 and Tiangong-1.

== Usage of crew and hardware ==
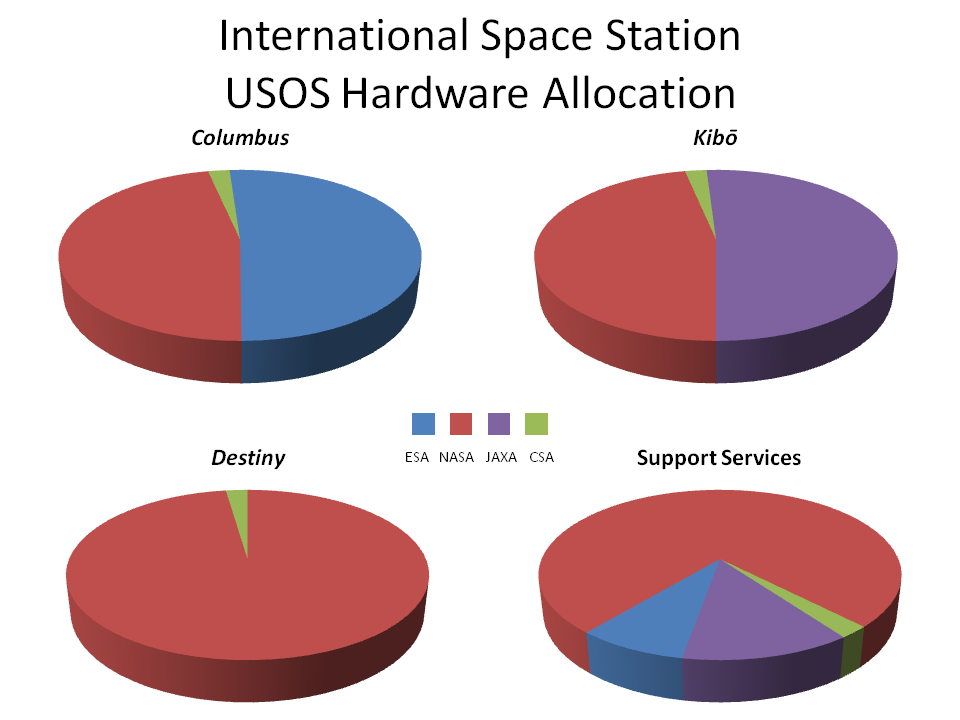
Allocation of US Orbital Segment hardware usage between nations

There is no fixed percentage of ownership for the whole space station. Rather, Article 5 of the IGA sets forth that each partner shall retain jurisdiction and control over the elements it registers and over personnel in or on the Space Station who are its nationals. Therefore, for each ISS module only one partner retains sole ownership. Still, the agreements to use the space station facilities are more complex.

The station is composed of two sides: the Russian Orbital Segment (ROS) and U.S. Orbital Segment (USOS).

- Russian Orbital Segment (mostly Russian ownership, except the Zarya module)
  - Zarya: first component of the Space Station, storage, USSR/Russia-built, U.S.-funded (hence U.S.-owned)
  - Zvezda: the functional centre of the Russian portion, living quarters, Russia-owned
  - Poisk: airlock, docking, Russia-owned
  - Rassvet: storage, docking
  - Nauka: multipurpose laboratory
  - Prichal: docking, Russia-owned
  - Pirs (Deorbited)
- U.S. Orbital Segment (mixed U.S. and international ownership)
  - Columbus laboratory: 51% for ESA, 46.7% for NASA and 2.3% for CSA.
  - Kibō laboratory: Japanese module, 51% for JAXA, 46.7% for NASA and 2.3% for CSA.
  - Destiny laboratory: 97.7% for NASA and 2.3% for CSA.
  - Crew time, electrical power and rights to purchase supporting services (such as data upload & download and communications) are divided 76.6% for NASA, 12.8% for JAXA, 8.3% for ESA, and 2.3% for CSA.

== History ==
In 1972, a milestone was reached in co-operation between the United States and the Soviet Union in space with the Apollo-Soyuz Test Project. The project occurred during a period of détente between the two superpowers, and led in July 1975 to Soyuz 19 docking with an Apollo spacecraft.

From 1978 to 1987, the USSR's Interkosmos program included allied Warsaw Pact countries and countries which were not Soviet allies, such as India, Syria, and France, in crewed and uncrewed missions to Space stations Salyut 6 and 7. In 1986, the USSR extended its co-operation to a dozen countries in the Mir program. From 1994 to 1998, NASA Space Shuttles and crew visited Mir in the Shuttle–Mir program.

In 1998, assembly of the space station began. On 28 January 1998, the Space Station Intergovernmental Agreement (IGA) was signed. This governs ownership of modules, station usage by participant nations, and responsibilities for station resupply. The signatories were the United States of America, Russia, Japan, Canada, and eleven member states of the European Space Agency (Belgium, Denmark, France, Germany, Italy, The Netherlands, Norway, Spain, Sweden, Switzerland, and the United Kingdom). With the exception of the United Kingdom, all of the signatories went on to contribute to the Space Station project. A second layer of agreements was then achieved, four memoranda of understanding between NASA and ESA, CSA, RKA and JAXA. These agreements are then further split, such as for the contractual obligations between nations, and trading of partners' rights and obligations. Use of the Russian Orbital Segment is also negotiated at this level.

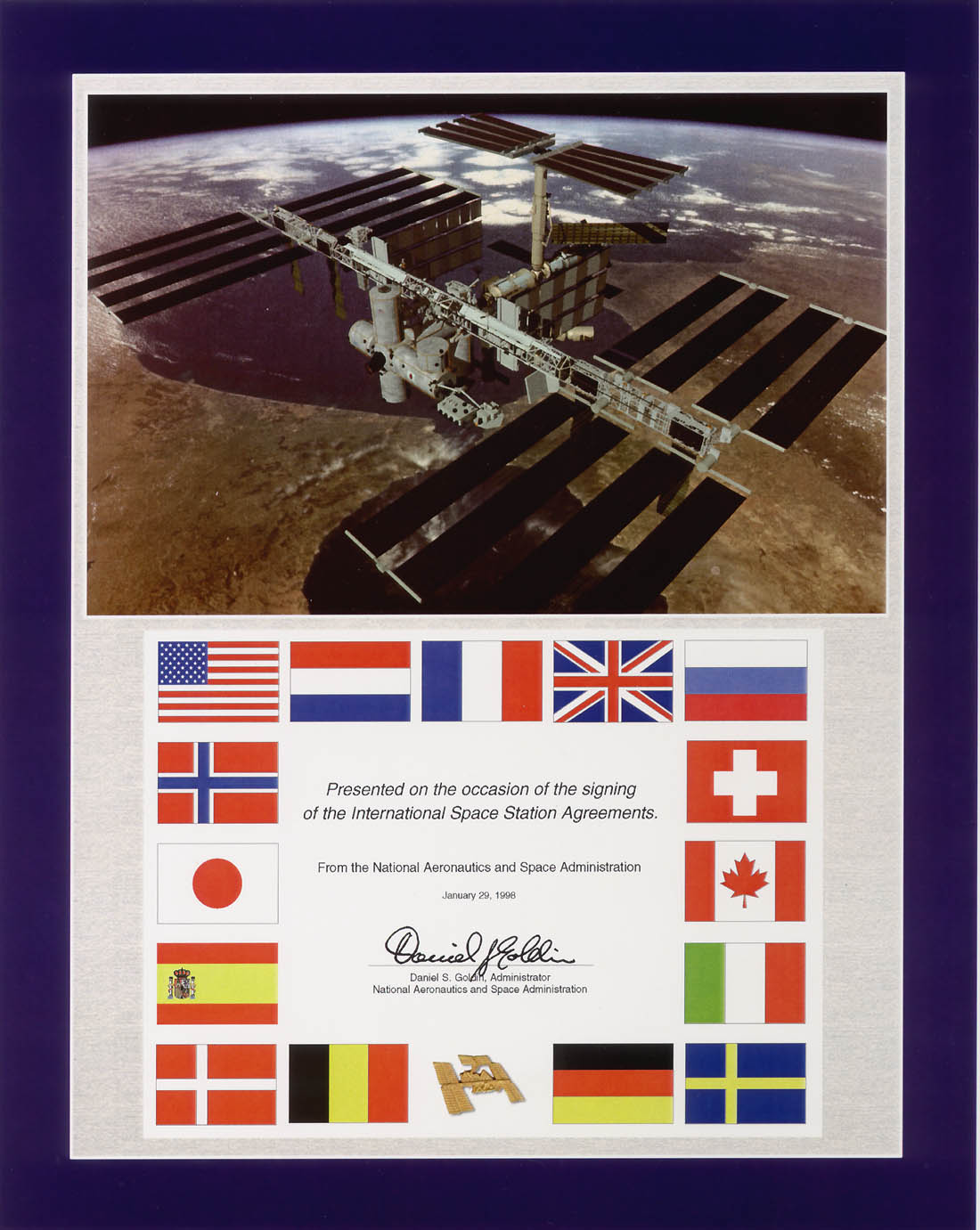
Dated January 29, 1998

In 2010, the ESA announced that European countries which were not already part of the program would be allowed access to the station in a three-year trial period.

In March 2012, a meeting in Quebec City between the leaders of the space agencies of Canada, Japan, Russia, the United States, and involved European nations resulted in a renewed pledge to maintain the space station until at least 2020. NASA reports to be still committed to the principles of the mission but also to use the station in new ways, which were not elaborated. CSA President Steve MacLean stated his belief that the station's Canadarm will continue to function properly until 2028, alluding to Canada's likely extension of its involvement beyond 2020.

On 28 March 2015, Russian sources announced that Roscosmos and NASA had agreed to collaborate on the development of a replacement for the current ISS. Igor Komarov, the head of Russia's Roscosmos, made the announcement with NASA administrator Charles Bolden at his side. In a statement provided to SpaceNews on 28 March, NASA spokesman David Weaver said the agency appreciated the Russian commitment to extending the ISS, but did not confirm any plans for a future space station.

On 30 September 2015, Boeing's contract with NASA as prime contractor for the ISS was extended to 30 September 2020. Part of Boeing's services under the contract related to extending the station's primary structural hardware past 2020 to the end of 2028.

There have also been suggestions in the commercial space industry that the station could be converted to commercial operations after it is retired by government entities.

In July 2018, the Space Frontier Act of 2018 was intended to extend operations of the ISS to 2030. This bill was unanimously approved in the Senate, but failed to pass in the U.S. House. In September 2018, the Leading Human Spaceflight Act was introduced with the intent to extend operations of the ISS to 2030, and was confirmed in December 2018.

On 12 April 2021, at a meeting with Russian President Vladimir Putin, then-Deputy Prime Minister Yury Borisov announced he had decided that Russia might withdraw from the ISS programme in 2025. According to Russian authorities, the timeframe of the station’s operations has expired and its condition leaves much to be desired.

In January 2022, NASA announced a planned date of January 2031 to de-orbit the ISS and direct any remnants into a remote area of the South Pacific Ocean.

On 24 February 2022, NASA said that American and Russian astronauts currently aboard the ISS would continue normal operations despite the 2022 Russian invasion of Ukraine. British Prime Minister Boris Johnson commented on the current status of cooperation, saying "I have been broadly in favour of continuing artistic and scientific collaboration, but in the current circumstances it's hard to see how even those can continue as normal." On the same day, Roscosmos Director General Dmitry Rogozin insinuated that Russian withdrawal could cause the International Space Station to de-orbit due to lack of reboost capabilities, writing in a series of tweets, "If you block cooperation with us, who will save the ISS from an unguided de-orbit to impact on the territory of the US or Europe? There's also the chance of impact of the 500-ton construction in India or China. Do you want to threaten them with such a prospect? The ISS doesn't fly over Russia, so all the risk is yours. Are you ready for it?" (The last claim is not true, as the ISS' orbital inclination of 51.66° allows it to overfly the latitude of Saratov.) Rogozin later tweeted that normal relations between ISS partners could only be restored once sanctions have been lifted, and indicated that Roscosmos would submit proposals to the Russian government on ending cooperation. NASA stated that, if necessary, US corporation Northrop Grumman has offered a reboost capability that would keep the ISS in orbit.

On 26 July 2022, Borisov, who had become head of Roscosmos, submitted to Putin his plans for withdrawal from the programme after 2024. However, Robyn Gatens, the NASA official in charge of space station operations, responded that NASA had not received any formal notices from Roscosmos concerning withdrawal plans. The United States Congress, in its CHIPS and Science Act signed by President Joe Biden on 9 August, approved extending NASA's funding for the ISS through 2030.

On 21 September 2022, Borisov stated that Russia was "highly likely" to continue to participate in the ISS programme until 2028, stating that it would be challenging to start up crewed space missions after such a long pause.

On 28 May 2025, former US astronaut and commander of the ISS Terry W. Virts alleged that Russian cosmonauts used the ISS for satellite reconnaissance photography of the Italian Aviano Air Base, where a US Air Force unit and US nuclear gravity bombs are stationed.

== By nation ==
=== Brazil ===
Brazil joined the ISS as a partner of the United States and this included a contract with NASA to supply hardware to the Space Station. In return, NASA would provide Brazil with access to NASA ISS facilities on-orbit, as well as a flight opportunity for one Brazilian astronaut during the course of the ISS program. However, due to cost issues, the subcontractor Embraer was unable to provide the promised ExPrESS pallet, and Brazil left the program in 2007. Regardless, the first Brazilian astronaut, Marcos Pontes, was sent to ISS in April 2006 for a short stay during the Expedition 13 where he realized the Missão Centenário. This was Brazil's first space traveler and he returned to Earth safely. Pontes trained on the Space Shuttle and Soyuz, but ended up going up with the Russians, although he did work at the U.S. Johnson Space Center after returning to Earth.

=== China ===
China is not an ISS partner, and no Chinese nationals have been aboard. China has its own contemporary human space program, China Manned Space Program, and has carried out co-operation and exchanges with countries such as Russia and Germany in human and robotic space projects. China launched its first experimental space station, Tiangong 1, in September 2011, and has officially initiated the permanently crewed Tiangong space station project since 2021.

In 2007, Chinese vice-minister of science and technology Li Xueyong said that China would like to participate in the ISS. In 2010, ESA Director-General Jean-Jacques Dordain stated his agency was ready to propose to the other 4 partners that China be invited to join the partnership, but that this needs to be a collective decision by all the current partners. While ESA is open to China's inclusion, the US is against it. US concerns over the transfer of technology that could be used for military purposes echo similar concerns over Russia's participation prior to its membership. Concerns over Russian involvement were overcome and NASA became solely dependent upon Russian crew capsules when its shuttles were grounded after the Columbia accident in 2003, and again after its retirement in 2011.

The Chinese government has voiced a belief that international exchanges and co-operation in the field of aerospace engineering should be intensified on the basis of mutual benefit, peaceful use and common development. China's crewed Shenzhou spacecraft use an APAS docking system, developed after a 1994–1995 deal for the transfer of Russian Soyuz spacecraft technology. Included in the agreement was training, provision of Soyuz capsules, life support systems, docking systems, and space suits. American observers comment that Shenzhou spacecraft could dock at the ISS if it became politically feasible, whilst Chinese engineers say work would still be required on the rendezvous system. Shenzhou 7 passed within about 45 kilometres of the ISS.

American co-operation with China in space is limited, though efforts have been made by both sides to improve relations, but in 2011 new American legislation further strengthened legal barriers to co-operation, preventing NASA co-operation with China or Chinese owned companies, even the expenditure of funds used to host Chinese visitors at NASA facilities, unless specifically authorized by new laws, at the same time China, Europe and Russia have a co-operative relationship in several space exploration projects. Between 2007 and 2011, the space agencies of Europe, Russia and China carried out the ground-based preparations in the Mars500 project, which complement the ISS-based preparations for a human mission to Mars.

On 28 April 2021 China launched the first part of an 11 series module space station named Tiangong Space Station. The Tianhe module was launched from the Wenchang Space Launch Site on a Long March 5B rocket, which contains only living quarters for crew members. The entire space station when constructed will require 10 additional launches between years 2021 through to 2022.

=== India ===
In July 2025, Indian astronaut Shubhanshu Shukla piloted the Axiom-4 mission marking India's first human presence on the ISS. This mission was part of a bilateral initiative between India and the US, aiming to prepare for India's Gaganyaan programme with rigorous training and scientific experiments aboard the ISS.

ISRO chairman K. Sivan announced in 2019 that India will not join the International Space Station programme and will instead build a 52 ton space station on its own. Its completion is expected to be in 2035.

=== South Korea ===
South Korea sent an astronaut to the International Space Station in cooperation with Russia, is on the verge of fulfilling its orbital launch capability (soon to be followed by a lunar orbiter) and plans to strengthen the commercialisation of space assets, particularly satellite imagery.

=== Italy ===
Italy has a contract with NASA to provide services to the station, and also takes part in the program directly via its membership in ESA.

=== Japan ===
Japan is an International Space Station partner and contributes the Japanese Experiment Module "Kibo". It has also provided cargo transport on the HTV cargo vehicle and HTV-X, with consideration of utilizing a variant for future lunar gateway missions.

== See also ==
- Outer Space Treaty
- Space advocacy
- Space law
- Space policy
