= Bogota Declaration =

Outer space treaty

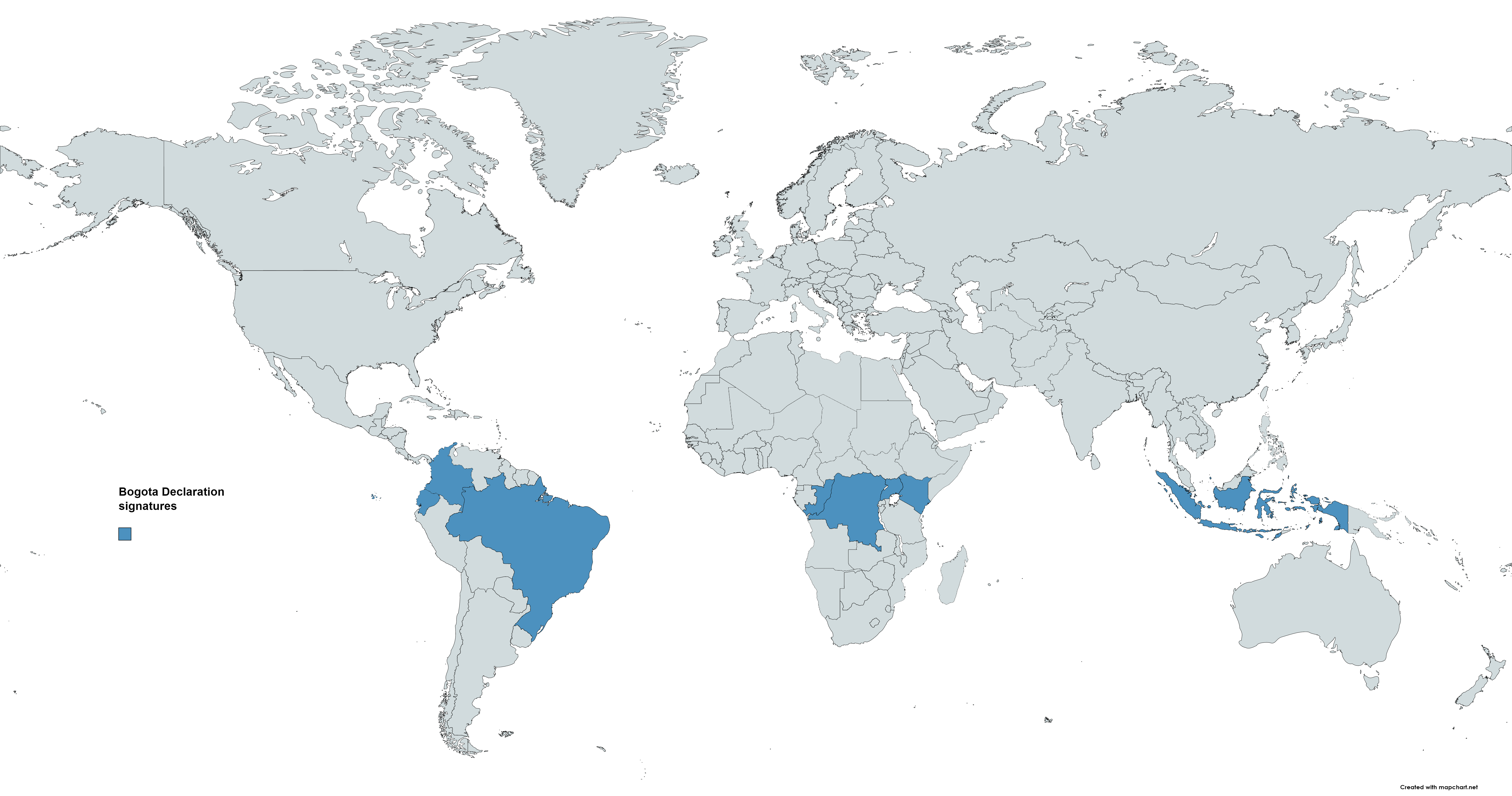
The eight signatories to the 1976 Bogota Declaration.

The Declaration of the First Meeting of Equatorial Countries, also known as the Bogota Declaration, is a declaration made and signed in 1976 by eight equatorial countries, and was an attempt to assert sovereignty over those portions of the geostationary orbit that continuously lie over the signatory nations' territory. These claims have been one of the few attempts to challenge the 1967 Outer Space Treaty, but they did not receive wider international support or recognition. Subsequently, they were largely abandoned.

== Background ==
The Outer Space Treaty is a treaty that forms the basis of international space law. The treaty was opened for signature in the United States, the United Kingdom, and the Soviet Union on 27 January 1967, and entered into force on 10 October 1967. In this time period, many countries in Africa and Asia were either newly independent or still in the process of decolonization from its former European colonizers. The treaty's ban on claims of sovereignty in space was interpreted differently by some of the newly independent countries, who saw the great powers of the time using their power to shape the laws that governed extraterritorial domains to their benefit.

== Bogota Declaration ==
Representatives of Ecuador, Colombia, Brazil, Congo, Zaire (in 1997 renamed to the Democratic Republic of the Congo), Uganda, Kenya, and Indonesia met in Bogotá, Colombia in 1976 and signed the declaration, thereby claiming control of the segment of the geosynchronous orbital path corresponding to each country, and argued that the segments above the high seas were the "common heritage of mankind" and ought, therefore, to be collectively governed by all nations. They claimed that the space above their territories did not fall under the definition of "outer space" by the 1967 Outer Space Treaty and was, therefore, a "natural resource". This would have led to a space ownership issue of practical importance, seen the satellites present in this geostationary orbit, whose slot allocations were managed by the International Telecommunication Union (ITU). These claims were seen as violating the 1967 Outer Space Treaty and did not receive wider international support or recognition. Subsequently, they were largely abandoned.

== See also ==
- Outer space
- Space law
- Extraterrestrial real estate
- American Declaration of the Rights and Duties of Man
