= Commercial Space Launch Act of 1984 =

Federal law facilitating commercialization of space technology

- Long title: An Act to facilitate commercial space launches, and for other purposes.
- Acronyms (colloquial): CSLA, ELVCA
- Nicknames: Expendable Launch Vehicle Commercialization Act
- Enacted by: the 98th United States Congress
- Effective: October 30, 1984

Citations
- Public law: 98-575
- Statutes at Large: 98 Stat. 3055

Codification
- Titles amended: 51 U.S.C.: National and Commercial Space Programs
- U.S.C. sections created: 51 U.S.C. § 50901 et seq.

Legislative history
- Introduced in the House as H.R. 3942 by Daniel Akaka (D–HI) on September 21, 1983; Committee consideration by House Science and Technology, Senate Commerce, Science, and Transportation; Passed the House on June 5, 1984 (passed voice vote); Passed the Senate on October 9, 1984 (passed voice vote) with amendment; House agreed to Senate amendment on October 9, 1984 (agreed unanimous consent); Signed into law by President Ronald Reagan on October 30, 1984

Commercial Space Launch Act of 1984 is a United States federal law authored to facilitate the private enterprise of the commercialization of space and space technology. The Act of Congress set forth the quest to acquire innovative equipment and services offered by entrepreneurial ventures from the information technology services, remote sensing technology, and telecommunications industries. The Act recognized the United States private sector as having the capability to develop commercial launch vehicles, orbital satellites, and operate private launch sites and services. The Act also assigned the duties of overseeing and coordinating commercial launches, issuing of licenses and permits, and promotion of safety standards to the Secretary of Department of Transportation.

The H.R. 3942 legislation was enacted by the 98th Congressional session and signed by President Ronald Reagan on October 30, 1984.

== History ==
In the 1970s, the National Aeronautics and Space Administration (NASA) began to look for ways to outsource the use of its launching facilities and services to private companies such as COMSAT, RCA, and Western Union. This search was because maintaining, modifying, launching, and other duties required to launch expendable launch vehicles cost upwards of billions of dollars. Once the space shuttle became operational, NASA and the United States Air Force (USAF) began using it almost exclusively. In order to accommodate the heavy weight of the space shuttle launch system, the USAF spent billions of dollars modifying one launch pad in Vandenberg Air Force Base. However, it was never used.

== Provisions of the Act ==
Title 51 United States Code Subtitle V and Chapter 509 was compiled as twenty-three code of law sections to vitalize commercial opportunities and space launch services for the civilian space program of the United States.

51 U.S.C. § 50901 - Findings and purposes
51 U.S.C. § 50902 - Definitions
51 U.S.C. § 50903 - General authority
51 U.S.C. § 50904 - Restrictions on launches, operations, and reentries
51 U.S.C. § 50905 - License applications and requirements
51 U.S.C. § 50906 - Experimental permits
51 U.S.C. § 50907 - Monitoring activities
51 U.S.C. § 50908 - Effective periods, and modifications, suspensions, and revocations, of licenses
51 U.S.C. § 50909 - Prohibition, suspension, and end of launches, operation of launch sites and reentry sites, and reentries
51 U.S.C. § 50910 - Preemption of scheduled launches or reentries
51 U.S.C. § 50911 - Space advertising
51 U.S.C. § 50912 - Administrative hearings and judicial review
51 U.S.C. § 50913 - Acquiring United States Government property and services
51 U.S.C. § 50914 - Liability insurance and financial responsibility requirements
51 U.S.C. § 50915 - Paying claims exceeding liability insurance and financial responsibility requirements
51 U.S.C. § 50916 - Disclosing information
51 U.S.C. § 50917 - Enforcement and penalty
51 U.S.C. § 50918 - Consultation
51 U.S.C. § 50919 - Relationship to other executive agencies, laws, and international obligations
51 U.S.C. § 50920 - User fees
51 U.S.C. § 50921 - Office of Commercial Space Transportation
51 U.S.C. § 50922 - Regulations
51 U.S.C. § 50923 - Report to Congress

== Amendments to 1984 Act ==
Chronological amendments to the Commercial Space Launch Act of 1984.

| Date of Enactment | Public Law Number | U.S. Statute Citation | U.S. Legislative Bill | U.S. Presidential Administration |
|---|---|---|---|---|
| November 15, 1988 | P.L. 100-657 | 102 Stat. 3900 | H.R. 4399 | Ronald W. Reagan |
| December 23, 2004 | P.L. 108-492 | 118 Stat. 3974 | H.R. 5382 | George W. Bush |

== See also ==
- Commercial Orbital Transportation Services – Former NASA program
- Commercial use of space – Economic activities related to space
- NewSpace – Spaceflight not by a government
- Office of Commercial Space Transportation – Branch of the US FAA
- Private spaceflight – Spaceflight not by a government
- Space advertising – Use of advertisements in outer space
- Timeline of private spaceflight
