= National Aeronautics and Space Act =

1958 U.S. law creating NASA

National Aeronautics and Space Act of 1958
- Other short titles: The Space Act of 1958
- Long title: An Act to provide for research into problems of flight within and outside the earth's atmosphere, and for other purposes.
- Acronyms (colloquial): NASA
- Enacted by: the 85th United States Congress
- Effective: July 29, 1958

Citations
- Public law: 85-568
- Statutes at Large: 72 Stat. 426-2

Codification
- Titles amended: 42 U.S.C.: Public Health and Social Welfare
- U.S.C. sections created: 42 U.S.C. ch. 26 § 2451 et seq.

Legislative history
- Introduced in the House as H.R. 12575 by John McCormack (D-MA) on May 24, 1958; Committee consideration by House Select Committee on Astronautics and Space Exploration; Passed the House on June 2, 1958 (passed); Passed the Senate on June 16, 1958 (passed); Reported by the joint conference committee on July 15, 1958; agreed to by the House on July 16, 1958 (agreed) and by the Senate on July 16, 1958 (agreed); Signed into law by President Dwight D. Eisenhower on July 29, 1958

The National Aeronautics and Space Act of 1958 (Pub. L. 85–568) is the United States federal statute that created the National Aeronautics and Space Administration (NASA). The Act, which followed close on the heels of the Soviet Union's launch of Sputnik, was drafted by the United States House Select Committee on Astronautics and Space Exploration and on July 29, 1958 was signed by President Eisenhower. Prior to enactment, the responsibility for space exploration was deemed primarily a military venture, in line with the Soviet model that had launched the first orbital satellite. In large measure, the Act was prompted by the lack of response by a US military infrastructure that seemed incapable of keeping up the space race.

The original 1958 act charged the new Agency with conducting the aeronautical and space activities of the United States "so as to contribute materially to one or more of the following objectives:"

- The expansion of human knowledge of phenomena in the atmosphere and space;
- The improvement of the usefulness, performance, speed, safety, and efficiency of aeronautical and space vehicles;
- The development and operation of vehicles capable of carrying instruments, equipment, supplies and living organisms through space;
- The establishment of long-range studies of the potential benefits to be gained from, the opportunities for, and the problems involved in the utilization of aeronautical and space activities for peaceful and scientific purposes.
- The preservation of the role of the United States as a leader in aeronautical and space science and technology and in the application thereof to the conduct of peaceful activities within and outside the atmosphere.
- The making available to agencies directly concerned with national defenses of discoveries that have military value or significance, and the furnishing by such agencies, to the civilian agency established to direct and control nonmilitary aeronautical and space activities, of information as to discoveries which have value or significance to that agency;
- Cooperation by the United States with other nations and groups of nations in work done pursuant to this Act and in the peaceful application of the results, thereof; and
- The most effective utilization of the scientific and engineering resources of the United States, with close cooperation among all interested agencies of the United States in order to avoid unnecessary duplication of effort, facilities, and equipment.

In 2012, a ninth objective was added:

- The preservation of the United States preeminent position in aeronautics and space through research and technology development related to associated manufacturing processes.

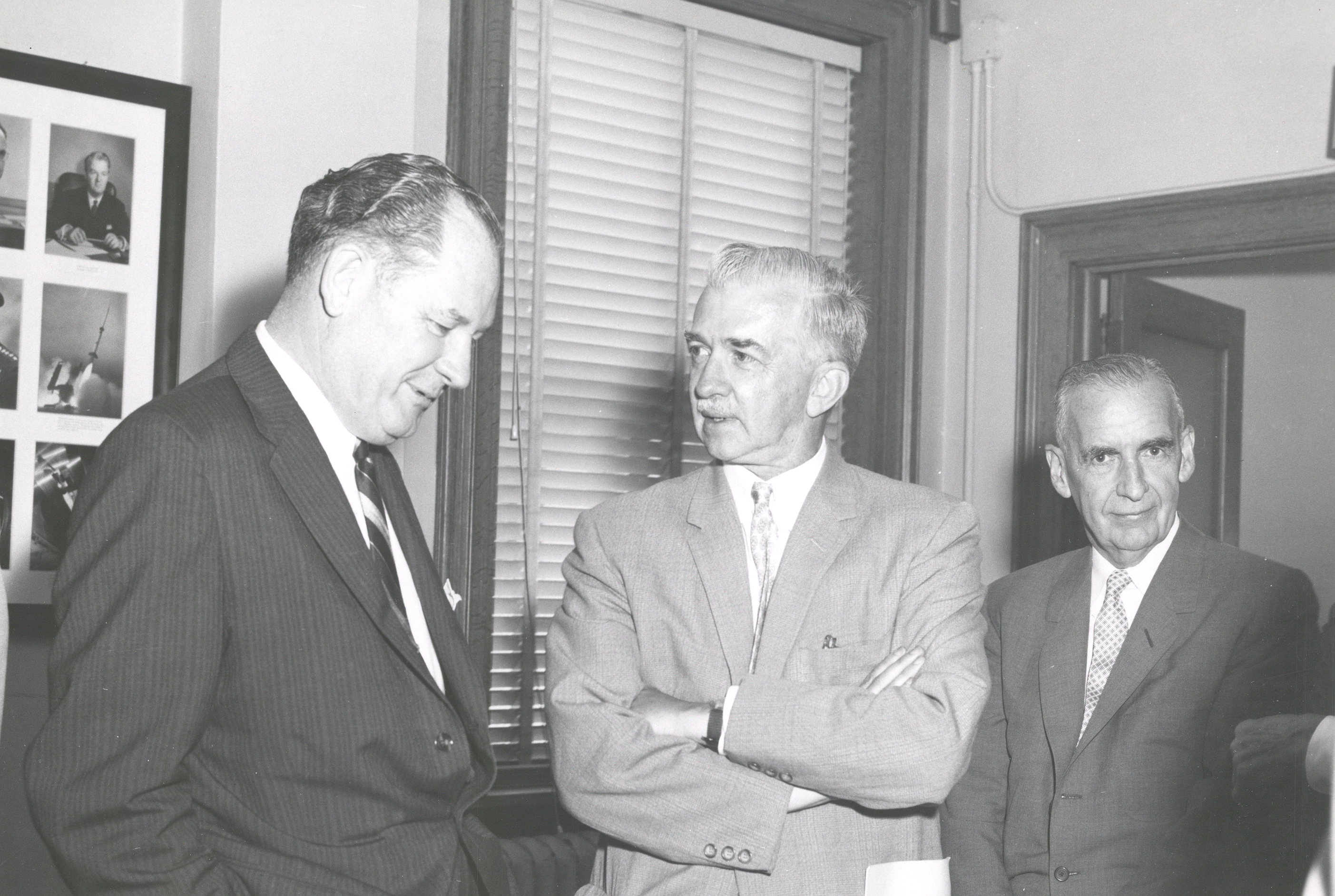
The final meeting of the NACA, before being absorbed into NASA

The Act abolished the National Advisory Committee for Aeronautics (NACA), transferring its activities and resources to NASA effective October 1, 1958. The Act also created a Civilian-Military Liaison Committee, later known as the National Aeronautics and Space Council (NASC), for the purpose of coordinating civilian and military space applications, and keeping NASA and the Department of Defense "fully and currently informed" of each other's space activities. To this day, the United States has coordinated but separate military and civilian space programs, with much of the former involved in launching military and surveillance craft and, prior to the Partial Test Ban Treaty, planning counter-measures to the anticipated Soviet launch of nuclear warheads into space.

In addition, the new law made extensive modifications to the patent law and provided that both employee inventions as well as private contractor innovations brought about through space travel would be subject to government ownership. By making the government the exclusive provider of space transport, the act effectively discouraged the private development of space travel. This situation endured until the law was modified by the Commercial Space Launch Act of 1984, enacted to allow civilian use of NASA systems in launching space vehicles.

The phrase "We came in peace for all mankind", inscribed on a plaque left on the Moon by the crew of Apollo 11, is derived from the Act's declaration of NASA's policy and purpose:

The Congress hereby declares that it is the policy of the United States that activities in space should be devoted to peaceful purposes for the benefit of all mankind.

The Act was subsequently amended to remove gender bias, so that this policy statement now reads:

Devotion of Space Activities to Peaceful Purposes for Benefit of All Humankind.--Congress declares that it is the policy of the United States that activities in space should be devoted to peaceful purposes for the benefit of all humankind.

== See also ==
- Spinoff history
