= Institute of Space and Telecommunications Law =

French space and telecommunications law institute

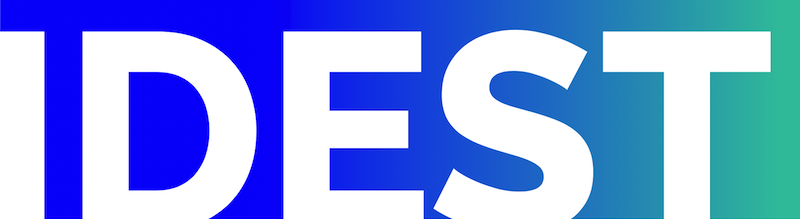

Agency overview
- Abbreviation: IDEST
- Type: Space agency
- Headquarters: Sceaux, France
- Administrator: Philippe Achilleas
- Website: Official website

The Institute of Space and Telecommunications Law (IDEST) was founded in 2000 under the initiative of professionals in the space and telecommunication sectors. The institute is attached to the Interdisciplinary College of Research at the University of Paris-Sud. IDEST is made up of a number of lecturers, professors, PhD students, and researchers under the control of a scientific counsel composed of professors and key figures in the sectors involved.

== Dual expertise ==
IDEST addresses all legal aspects linked to the use of outer space and space applications. The Institute also focuses on industrial cooperation, project finance, and the analysis of national space politics on the civil, commercial and military levels. IDEST also exercises its competences in the law of electronic communications domain, notably in terms of market regulation, the use of limited resources, the normalization of equipment and applications. Furthermore, the Institute also addresses issues related to the aforementioned key sectors: information law, media law, defense and security.

== A policy of international research ==
The institute regroups researchers from more than ten countries, and has the capacity to produce research in several languages, including: Arabic, Chinese, English, French, German, Iranian, Japanese, Russian, and Spanish. The Institute has overseas representatives who travel in relation with the Parisian unit. Since its creation, IDEST has concluded numerous research contracts with the main spatial and telecommunication institutions. Its members publish in referenced journals and participate in all the major scientific events worldwide. The institute supervises Ph D, much of which is undertaken in co-direction with foreign establishments.

== An established educational expertise ==
IDEST is involved in the management of the master's degree in Space Activities and Telecommunications Law at the University of Paris-Sud. Its members partake as speakers at numerous other universities and grandes écoles in France and overseas, notably at the Institut Supérieur de l'Aéronautique et de l'Espace (ISAE), Supélec, ENSTA ParisTech, the International Space University, the University of Strasbourg, the Paris Institute of Political Studies. IDEST has also trained professors in the space and telecommunication law lecturing both in France and overseas.

In 2011, a convention was signed between the Institut Supérieur de l'Aéronautique et de l'Espace and the University of Paris-Sud for the development and cooperation between the two establishments in space law.

== Meetings and encounters with IDEST ==
=== European Days ===
With its international network of researchers and former students, IDEST regularly organizes European days within the European Union. These European days reunite universities and local French practitioners in the same town over two years in order to reinforce academic and professional cooperation by a combination of national legal experiences and the cultural approaches in law.

IDEST's first European days took place at Sibiu in Romania concerning Europe in the information society (2007) and the Regulation of the telecommunication market (2009). The second IDEST European days took place at Budapest, Hungary on Competition and the regulation of the telecommunication market (2010) and Competition in the network industries (2011).

=== World Telecommunication and Information Society Day conferences ===
World Telecommunication and Information Society Day was created by the International Telecommunication Union (ITU) with the goal of increasing public awareness about the use of information technology in the economic and social domains, as ways to reduce the digital divide.

17 May marks the anniversary of the signing of the first International Telegraph Convention and the creation of the International Telecommunication Union, the reason for this date being chosen as World Telecommunication and Information Society Day. In this framework, IDEST organizes every year legal conferences reuniting specialists in telecommunication law with lawyers and other legal practitioners to confront often highly complex questions in relation to the development of electronic communications networks and services.

In 2010, the conference’s chosen theme was The New Regulatory Framework of Telecommunications after the 2009 Review in regards to the European Regulation’s transposition into French law. The 2011 conference was on High Speed Broadband for All.

== Contracts and Research ==
=== National Contracts ===
Since its creation, IDEST has obtained several national research contracts, notably from the National Center for Space Studies (CNES) in the framework of the elaboration of a Bill on space operations, in which IDEST was strongly involved. IDEST equally signed a major contract with the Ile de France region to develop the mobility of students and researchers in the telecommunications law between the University of Paris-Sud and universities in the town of Budapest. In 2011, following the signing of two contracts, one for the French National Frequencies Agency (ANFR), the other for the National Center for Space Studies, IDEST is currently working on a fact-finding mission based on the law of frequencies. IDEST is also currently working on an assessment of spatial governance in Europe for the French strategic analysis center, linked to the French Prime Minister.

=== European contracts ===
Following two research contracts with the European Space Agency (ESA) in the domain of planetary protection and space-based solar power stations, IDEST won two major projects for the European Union: The European Twinning Project UA/06/PCA/OT/05 Boosting Ukrainian Space Cooperation with the European Union, resulting in a series of meetings organized in Kyiv between June 2008 and February 2010; and the Collaborative Project Consent (the 7th Framework Programme) relating to the protection of personal data in social networks. IDEST has also worked in close collaboration with the Romanian authorities in the transposition of the European law of telecommunications into Romanian national law.

=== International Contracts ===
Amongst its international research contracts, IDEST has carried out research for Lockheed Martin (USA) on the protection of spatial assets, and for the State of Singapore on space tourism.

== Partnerships ==
=== Universities/Research Centers ===
IDEST has developed strategic partnerships with several universities in France and overseas: Institut Supérieur de l'Aéronautique et de l'Espace (Toulouse, France), Space Policy Institute (Washington, USA), the International Centre of Space Law (Kyiv, Ukraine), Pázmány Péter Catholic University (Budapest, Hungary), University of Jaén (Jaén, Spain), Harbin Institute of Technology (Harbin, China) and University La Sapienza (Rome, Italy).

=== The Professional Environment ===
Since its creation, IDEST has formed solid relations in the space and telecommunication professional milieus. The Institute was created under the impetus of the National Center for Space Studies and the European Space Agency, and its activities are supported by many prestigious operators, including Eutelsat, EADS, Marsh and Thales. In the domain of telecommunications, the French Regulator of the Electronic Communications and Postal Sectors (ARCEP) and the French Regulatory Authority for Frequencies (ANFr) also participated in defining the research activities of the Institute which today benefits from privileged links with the France Télécom Group. Finally, several law firms work in collaboration with IDEST, including Bird & Bird, Ernst & Young, Gide Loyrette Nouel, Iteanu & Associés, and YGMA.

== Master's degree in Space Activities and Telecommunications Law ==
Being the first qualification in the world to link the study of the space activities law with the telecommunications law, this degree was set up with the support of professional bodies to meet the needs of rapidly expanding industries looking for highly qualified graduates. The content of the Master was developed in partnership with the major companies and institutions in the space/aeronautical and telecommunication sectors.

Every year a steering committee agrees on the curriculum to be covered in order to respond to the evolving needs of the space and telecommunications markets. Core subjects are complemented by practical seminars and a long-term work placement (in France or overseas). Regular and lasting contact with the labor market is gained through an educational team consisting mainly of practitioners (70% of the teaching body), lectures run by future potential employers, lectures given on the premises of companies (50%) and prestigious institutions, visits and professional voyages both in France and overseas, and through an international network of alumni and the course’s partners.

=== An International Degree ===
The course encompasses Europe and the wider world through teaching which combines both national and transnational approaches to issues. Lessons are held in French and English by a multicultural team of lecturers (9 nationalities). Classes consist of 50% overseas students (since 2002, the Master has welcomed 422 students coming from 68 different nationalities) all of whom participate in a large number of international events.

=== An Interdisciplinary Degree ===
The course has been designed for future career prospects in mind, by linking law to other disciplines – the sciences, economics, management, and political sciences.

=== Sponsoring every year ===
Every class has a sponsor who assists the students all year round. The class is named after the sponsor.

- 2002 – 2003 : National Center for Space Studies (CNES)
- 2003 – 2004 : European Space Agency (ESA)
- 2004 – 2005 : EADS
- 2005 – 2006 : Autorité de Régulation des Communications Électroniques, des Postes et de la Distribution de la Presse (French Regulator of the Electronic Communications and Postal Sectors, ARCEP)
- 2006 – 2007 : France Télécom
- 2007 – 2008 : Eutelsat
- 2008 – 2009 : Minister of the Economy, Industry and Employment - France
- 2009 – 2010 : Thales Alenia Space (TAS)
- 2010 – 2011 : Gide Loyrette Nouel
- 2011 – 2012 : Safran
- 2012 – 2013 : Bouygues Telecom
- 2013 – 2014 : Arianespace
- 2014 – 2015 : French National Frequency Agency (ANFR)
- 2015 – 2016 : Iliad SA
- 2016 – 2017 : SES S.A.
- 2017 – 2018 :
- 2018 – 2019 : huawei
- 2019 – 2020 : International Telecommunication Union (ITU)
- 2020 – 2021 : European Astronaut Corps (ESA)
- 2021 – 2022 : Orange S.A.

=== Awards and Ranking ===
The French Agency for Academic Evaluation (AERES) has given the Master its best mark (A+), considering this program to be among the best in France in all disciplines.

== See also ==
- Space law
- Legal aspects of computing
