= Title 51 of the United States Code =

U.S. federal statutes on space programs

Title 51 of the United States Code (51 U.S.C.), entitled National and Commercial Space Programs, is the compilation of the general laws regarding space programs. It was promulgated by U.S. president Barack Obama on December 18, 2010 when he signed PL 111-314 (H.R. 3237) into law.

== Background ==
Since the 1940s, many statutes have been enacted relating to national and commercial space programs. In the U.S. Code, some of these statutes are codified in Title 15, Commerce and Trade, Title 42, The Public Health and Welfare and Title 49, Transportation. No single title had previously existed in the U.S. Code for space programs, as the Code was established in 1926, before the Space Age.

== Effect ==
Title 51 does not modify or repeal existing programs. Rather, it restates existing law in a manner that adheres to the policy, intent and purpose of the original laws, whilst improving the organizational structure of the law and removing imperfections.

== Codification history ==
Title 51 was prepared by the Office of the Law Revision Counsel of the United States House of Representatives, in accordance with 2 U.S.C. § 285b.

H.R. 3237 was introduced on July 16, 2009, and referred to the Committee on the Judiciary of the House of Representatives. The Committee considered the bill in full committee mark-up on October 21, 2009, and ordered the bill to be reported. The bill was reported by the Committee on November 2, 2009, and passed by the House of Representatives on January 13, 2010. On January 20, 2010, the bill was received in the Senate and referred to the Senate Committee on the Judiciary. The Committee considered the bill in full committee mark-up on May 6, 2010, and on May 10 it was reported by the Committee without amendment. The bill passed in the Senate by unanimous consent on December 3, and was signed into law by President Obama on December 18.

== Codes ==
SUBTITLE I - General (§ 10101)

CHAPTER 101 - DEFINITIONS (§ 10101)

(1) Administration.—

The term "Administration" means the National Aeronautics and Space Administration.

(2) Administrator.—

The term "Administrator" means the Administrator of the National Aeronautics and Space Administration.

SUBTITLE II - General Program and Policy Provisions (§§ 20101 to 20305)

CHAPTER 201 - NATIONAL AERONAUTICS AND SPACE PROGRAM (§§ 20101 to 20164)

SUBCHAPTER I - SHORT TITLE, DECLARATION OF POLICY, AND DEFINITIONS (§§ 20101 to 20103)

§ 20101 - Short title
§ 20102 - Congressional declaration of policy and purpose
§ 20103 - Definitions

SUBCHAPTER II - COORDINATION OF AERONAUTICAL AND SPACE ACTIVITIES (§§ 20111 to 20117)

§ 20111 - National Aeronautics and Space Administration
§ 20112 - Functions of the Administration
§ 20113 - Powers of the Administration in performance of functions
§ 20114 - Administration and Department of Defense coordination
§ 20115 - International cooperation
§ 20116 - Reports to Congress
§ 20117 - Disposal of excess land

SUBCHAPTER III - GENERAL ADMINISTRATIVE PROVISIONS (§§ 20131 to 20147)

§ 20131 - Public access to information
§ 20132 - Security requirements
§ 20133 - Permission to carry firearms
§ 20134 - Arrest authority
§ 20135 - Property rights in inventions
§ 20136 - Contributions awards
§ 20137 - Malpractice and negligence suits against United States
§ 20138 - Insurance and indemnification
§ 20139 - Insurance for experimental aerospace vehicles
§ 20140 - Appropriations
§ 20141 - Misuse of agency name and initials
§ 20142 - Contracts regarding expendable launch vehicles
§ 20143 - Full cost appropriations account structure
§ 20144 - Prize authority
§ 20145 - Lease of non-excess property
§ 20146 - Retrocession of jurisdiction
§ 20147 - Recovery and disposition authority

SUBCHAPTER IV - UPPER ATMOSPHERE RESEARCH (§§ 20161 to 20164)

§ 20161 - Congressional declaration of purpose and policy
§ 20162 - Definition of upper atmosphere
§ 20163 - Program authorized
§ 20164 - International cooperation

CHAPTER 203 - RESPONSIBILITIES AND VISION (§§ 20301 to 20305)

§ 20301 - General responsibilities
§ 20302 - Vision for space exploration
§ 20303 - Contribution to innovation
§ 20304 - Basic research enhancement
§ 20305 - National Academies decadal surveys

SUBTITLE III - Administrative Provisions (§§ 30101 to 31505)

CHAPTER 301 - APPROPRIATIONS, BUDGETS, AND ACCOUNTING (§§ 30101 to 30104)

§ 30101 - Prior authorization of appropriations required
§ 30102 - Working capital fund
§ 30103 - Budgets
§ 30104 - Baselines and cost controls

CHAPTER 303 - CONTRACTING AND PROCUREMENT (§§ 30301 to 30310)

§ 30301 - Guaranteed customer base
§ 30302 - Quality assurance personnel
§ 30303 - Tracking and data relay satellite services
§ 30304 - Award of contracts to small businesses and disadvantaged individuals
§ 30305 - Outreach program
§ 30306 - Small business contracting
§ 30307 - Requirement for independent cost analysis
§ 30308 - Cost effectiveness calculations
§ 30309 - Use of abandoned and underutilized buildings, grounds, and facilities
§ 30310 - Exception to alternative fuel procurement requirement

CHAPTER 305 - MANAGEMENT AND REVIEW (§§ 30501 to 30504)

§ 30501 - Lessons learned and best practices
§ 30502 - Whistleblower protection
§ 30503 - Performance assessments
§ 30504 - Assessment of science mission extensions

CHAPTER 307 - INTERNATIONAL COOPERATION AND COMPETITION (§§ 30701 to 30704)

§ 30701 - Competitiveness and international cooperation
§ 30702 - Foreign contract limitation
§ 30703 - Foreign launch vehicles
§ 30704 - Offshore performance of contracts for the procurement of goods and services

CHAPTER 309 - AWARDS (§§ 30901 to 30902)

§ 30901 - Congressional Space Medal of Honor
§ 30902 - Charles "Pete" Conrad Astronomy Awards

CHAPTER 311 - SAFETY (§§ 31101 to 31102)

§ 31101 - Aerospace Safety Advisory Panel
§ 31102 - Drug and alcohol testing

CHAPTER 313 - HEALTHCARE (§§ 31301 to 31302)

§ 31301 - Healthcare program
§ 31302 - Astronaut healthcare survey

CHAPTER 315 - MISCELLANEOUS (§§ 31501 to 31505)

§ 31501 - Orbital debris
§ 31502 - Maintenance of facilities
§ 31503 - Laboratory productivity
§ 31504 - Cooperative unmanned aerial vehicle activities
§ 31505 - Development of enhanced-use lease policy

SUBTITLE IV - Aeronautics and Space Research and Education (§§ 40101 to 40909)

CHAPTER 401 - AERONAUTICS (§§ 40101 to 40141)

SUBCHAPTER I - GENERAL (§§ 40101 to 40104)

§ 40101 - Definition of institution of higher education
§ 40102 - Governmental interest in aeronautics research and development
§ 40103 - Cooperation with other agencies on aeronautics activities
§ 40104 - Cooperation among Mission Directorates

SUBCHAPTER II - HIGH PRIORITY AERONAUTICS RESEARCH AND DEVELOPMENT PROGRAMS (§§ 40111 to 40116)

§ 40111 - Fundamental research program
§ 40112 - Research and technology programs
§ 40113 - Airspace systems research
§ 40114 - Aviation safety and security research
§ 40115 - Aviation weather research
§ 40116 - University-based Centers for Research on Aviation Training

SUBCHAPTER III - SCHOLARSHIPS (§ 40131)

§ 40131 - Aeronautics scholarships

SUBCHAPTER IV - DATA REQUESTS (§ 40141)

§ 40141 - Aviation data requests

CHAPTER 403 - NATIONAL SPACE GRANT COLLEGE AND FELLOWSHIP PROGRAM (§§ 40301 to 40311)

§ 40301 - Purposes
§ 40302 - Definitions
§ 40303 - National space grant college and fellowship program
§ 40304 - Grants or contracts
§ 40305 - Specific national needs
§ 40306 - Space grant college and space grant regional consortium
§ 40307 - Space grant fellowship program
§ 40308 - Space grant review panel
§ 40309 - Availability of other Federal personnel and data
§ 40310 - Designation or award to be on competitive basis
§ 40311 - Continuing emphasis

CHAPTER 405 - BIOMEDICAL RESEARCH IN SPACE (§§ 40501 to 40505)

§ 40501 - Biomedical research joint working group
§ 40502 - Biomedical research grants
§ 40503 - Biomedical research fellowships
§ 40504 - Establishment of electronic data archive
§ 40505 - Establishment of emergency medical service telemedicine capability

CHAPTER 407 - ENVIRONMENTALLY FRIENDLY AIRCRAFT (§§ 40701 to 40704)

§ 40701 - Research and development initiative
§ 40702 - Additional research and development initiative
§ 40703 - Research alignment
§ 40704 - Research program on perceived impact of sonic booms

CHAPTER 409 - MISCELLANEOUS

§ 40901 - Science, Space, and Technology Education Trust Fund
§ 40902 - National Aeronautics and Space Administration Endeavor Teacher Fellowship Trust Fund
§ 40903 - Experimental Program to Stimulate Competitive Research—merit grant competition requirements
§ 40904 - Microgravity research
§ 40905 - Program to expand distance learning in rural underserved areas
§ 40906 - Equal access to the Administration's education programs
§ 40907 - Museums
§ 40908 - Continuation of certain education programs
§ 40909 - Compliance with title IX of Education Amendments of 1972

SUBTITLE V - Programs Targeting Commercial Opportunities (§§ 50101 to 51303)

CHAPTER 501 - SPACE COMMERCE (§§ 50101 to 50134)

SUBCHAPTER I - GENERAL (§ 50101)

§ 50101 - Definitions

SUBCHAPTER II - PROMOTION OF COMMERCIAL SPACE OPPORTUNITIES (§§ 50111 to 50116)

§ 50111 - Commercialization of Space Station
§ 50112 - Promotion of United States Global Positioning System standards
§ 50113 - Acquisition of space science data
§ 50114 - Administration of commercial space centers
§ 50115 - Sources of Earth science data
§ 50116 - Commercial technology transfer program

SUBCHAPTER III - FEDERAL ACQUISITION OF SPACE TRANSPORTATION SERVICES (§§ 50131 to 50134)::CHAPTER 503 - COMMERCIAL REUSABLE IN-SPACE TRANSPORTATION (§§ 50301 to 50302)

§ 50131 - Requirement to procure commercial space transportation services
§ 50132 - Acquisition of commercial space transportation services
§ 50133 - Shuttle privatization
§ 50134 - Use of excess intercontinental ballistic missiles

CHAPTER 505 - COMMERCIAL SPACE COMPETITIVENESS (§§ 50501 to 50506)

§ 50501 - Definitions
§ 50502 - Launch voucher demonstration program
§ 50503 - Anchor tenancy and termination liability
§ 50504 - Use of Government facilities
§ 50505 - Test facilities
§ 50506 - Commercial Space Achievement Award

CHAPTER 507 - OFFICE OF SPACE COMMERCE (§§ 50701 to 50703)

§ 50701 - Definition of Office
§ 50702 - Establishment
§ 50703 - Annual report

CHAPTER 509 - COMMERCIAL SPACE LAUNCH ACTIVITIES (§§ 50901 to 50923)

§ 50901 - Findings and purposes
§ 50902 - Definitions
§ 50903 - General authority
§ 50904 - Restrictions on launches, operations, and reentries
§ 50905 - License applications and requirements
§ 50906 - Experimental permits
§ 50907 - Monitoring activities
§ 50908 - Effective periods, and modifications, suspensions, and revocations, of licenses
§ 50909 - Prohibition, suspension, and end of launches, operation of launch sites and reentry sites, and reentries
§ 50910 - Preemption of scheduled launches or reentries
§ 50911 - Space advertising
§ 50912 - Administrative hearings and judicial review
§ 50913 - Acquiring United States Government property and services
§ 50914 - Liability insurance and financial responsibility requirements
§ 50915 - Paying claims exceeding liability insurance and financial responsibility requirements
§ 50916 - Disclosing information
§ 50917 - Enforcement and penalty
§ 50918 - Consultation
§ 50919 - Relationship to other executive agencies, laws, and international obligations
§ 50920 - User fees
§ 50921 - Office of Commercial Space Transportation
§ 50922 - Regulations
§ 50923 - Report to Congress

CHAPTER 511 - SPACE TRANSPORTATION INFRASTRUCTURE MATCHING GRANTS (§§ 51101 to 51105)

§ 51101 - Definitions
§ 51102 - Grant authority
§ 51103 - Grant applications
§ 51104 - Environmental requirements
§ 51105 - Authorization of appropriations

CHAPTER 513 - SPACE RESOURCE COMMERCIAL EXPLORATION AND UTILIZATION (§§ 51301 to 51303)

§ 51301 - Definitions
§ 51302 - Commercial exploration and commercial recovery
§ 51303 - Asteroid resource and space resource rights

SUBTITLE VI - Earth Observations (§§ 60101 to 60506)

CHAPTER 601 - LAND REMOTE SENSING POLICY (§§ 60101 to 60162)

SUBCHAPTER I - GENERAL (§ 60101)

§ 60101 - Definitions

SUBCHAPTER II - LANDSAT (§§ 60111 to 60113)

§ 60111 - Landsat Program Management
§ 60112 - Transfer of Landsat 6 program responsibilities
§ 60113 - Data policy for Landsat 7

SUBCHAPTER III - LICENSING OF PRIVATE REMOTE SENSING SPACE SYSTEMS (§§ 60121 to 60126)

§ 60121 - General licensing authority
§ 60122 - Conditions for operation
§ 60123 - Administrative authority of Secretary
§ 60124 - Regulatory authority of Secretary
§ 60125 - Agency activities
§ 60126 - Annual reports

SUBCHAPTER IV - RESEARCH, DEVELOPMENT, AND DEMONSTRATION (§§ 60131 to 60134)

§ 60131 - Continued Federal research and development
§ 60132 - Availability of federally gathered unenhanced data
§ 60133 - Technology demonstration program
§ 60134 - Preference for private sector land remote sensing system

SUBCHAPTER V - GENERAL PROVISIONS (§§ 60141 to 60148)

§ 60141 - Nondiscriminatory data availability
§ 60142 - Archiving of data
§ 60143 - Nonreproduction
§ 60144 - Reimbursement for assistance
§ 60145 - Acquisition of equipment
§ 60146 - Radio frequency allocation
§ 60147 - Consultation
§ 60148 - Enforcement

SUBCHAPTER VI - PROHIBITION OF COMMERCIALIZATION OF WEATHER SATELLITES (§§ 60161 to 60162)

§ 60161 - Prohibition
§ 60162 - Future considerations

CHAPTER 603 - REMOTE SENSING (§§ 60301 to 60306)

§ 60301 - Definitions
§ 60302 - General responsibilities
§ 60303 - Pilot projects to encourage public sector applications
§ 60304 - Program evaluation
§ 60305 - Data availability
§ 60306 - Education

CHAPTER 605 - EARTH SCIENCE (§§ 60501 to 60506)

§ 60501 - Goal
§ 60502 - Transitioning experimental research into operational services
§ 60503 - Reauthorization of Glory Mission
§ 60504 - Tornadoes and other severe storms
§ 60505 - Coordination with the National Oceanic and Atmospheric Administration
§ 60506 - Sharing of climate related data

SUBTITLE VII - Access to Space (§§ 70101 to 71302)

CHAPTER 701 - USE OF SPACE LAUNCH SYSTEM OR ALTERNATIVES (§§ 70101 to 70104)

§ 70101 - Recovery of fair value of placing Department of Defense payloads in orbit with space launch system
§ 70102 - Space launch system use policy
§ 70103 - Commercial payloads on space launch system
§ 70104 - Definition of Space Launch System

CHAPTER 703 - SHUTTLE PRICING POLICY FOR COMMERCIAL AND FOREIGN USERS (§§ 70301 to 70304)

§ 70301 - Congressional findings and declarations
§ 70302 - Purpose, policy, and goals
§ 70303 - Definition of additive cost
§ 70304 - Duties of Administrator

CHAPTER 705 - EXPLORATION INITIATIVES (§§ 70501 to 70508)

§ 70501 - Space shuttle follow-on
§ 70502 - Exploration plan and programs
§ 70503 - Ground-based analog capabilities
§ 70504 - Stepping stone approach to exploration
§ 70505 - Lunar outpost
§ 70506 - Exploration technology research
§ 70507 - Technology development
§ 70508 - Robotic or human servicing of spacecraft

CHAPTER 707 - HUMAN SPACE FLIGHT INDEPENDENT INVESTIGATION COMMISSION (§§ 70701 to 70710)

§ 70701 - Definitions
§ 70702 - Establishment of Commission
§ 70703 - Tasks of Commission
§ 70704 - Composition of Commission
§ 70705 - Powers of Commission
§ 70706 - Public meetings, information, and hearings
§ 70707 - Staff of Commission
§ 70708 - Compensation and travel expenses
§ 70709 - Security clearances for Commission members and staff
§ 70710 - Reporting requirements and termination

CHAPTER 709 - INTERNATIONAL SPACE STATION (§§ 70901 to 70907)

§ 70901 - Peaceful uses of space station
§ 70902 - Allocation of International Space Station research budget
§ 70903 - International Space Station research
§ 70904 - International Space Station completion
§ 70905 - National laboratory designation
§ 70906 - International Space Station National Laboratory Advisory Committee
§ 70907 - Maintaining use through at least 2024

CHAPTER 711 - NEAR-EARTH OBJECTS (§§ 71101 to 71104)

§ 71101 - Reaffirmation of policy
§ 71102 - Requests for information
§ 71103 - Developing policy and recommending responsible Federal agency
§ 71104 - Planetary radar

CHAPTER 713 - COOPERATION FOR SAFETY AMONG SPACEFARING NATIONS (§§ 71301 to 71302)

§ 71301 - Common docking system standard to enable rescue
§ 71302 - Information sharing to avoid physical or radio-frequency interference
