= Moriba Jah =

American aerospace engineer (born 1971)

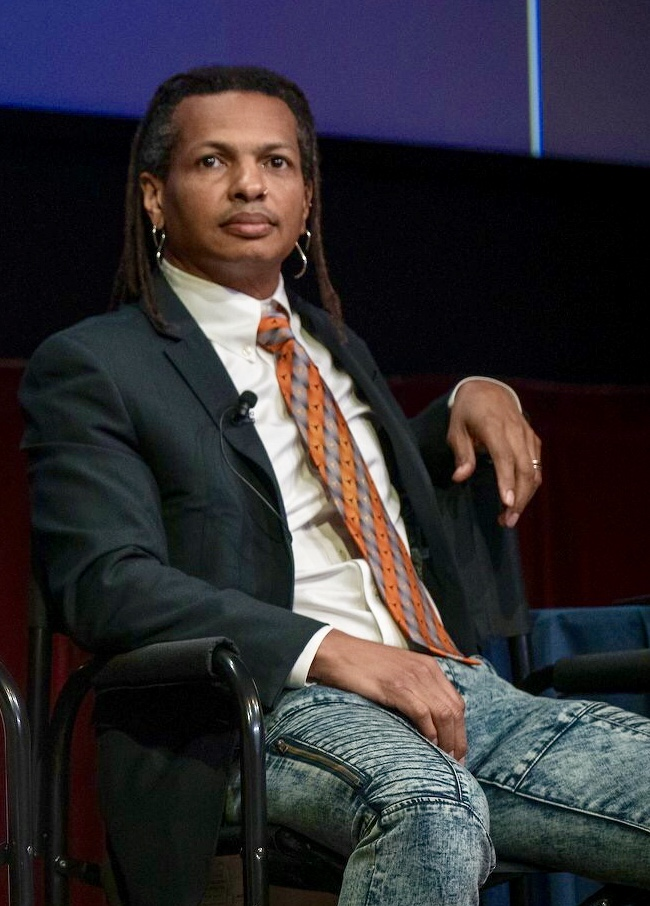
- Born: Moriba Kemessia Jah; March 23, 1971 (age 55); San Francisco, California, U.S.
- Education: Embry–Riddle Aeronautical University (BS); University of Colorado, Boulder (MS, PhD)
- Known for: Space Situational Awareness Programme, space surveillance and tracking, space traffic management,
- Awards: TED Fellow; Academician, International Academy of Astronautics; NASA Space Act Award; American Institute of Aeronautics and Astronautics Fellow; National Defense Service Medal
- Scientific career
- Fields: Astrodynamics; satellite navigation
- Workplaces: University of Texas at Austin; University of Arizona; Air Force Research Laboratory; Jet Propulsion Laboratory; Los Alamos National Laboratory
- Thesis: Mars aerobraking spacecraft state estimation by processing inertial measurement unit data (2005)
- Doctoral advisor: George Born
- Other academic advisors: Ronald Madler, Penina Axelrad
- Website: utexas.academia.edu/MoribaJah

Moriba Kemessia Jah (born 1971) is an American space scientist and aerospace engineer who describes himself as a "space environmentalist". Jah is adamant about finding solutions to the accumulating garbage in space. He specializes in orbit determination and prediction, especially as related to space situational awareness and space traffic monitoring. He is currently a full professor of Aerospace Engineering and Engineering Mechanics at the University of Texas at Austin, a position he attained in 2024, and a National Geographic Explorer. Jah has co-founded Privateer Space x Orbital Insight, GaiaVerse, and Moriba Jah Universal. His work now broadly focuses on decision intelligence to improve the stewardship of the planet and beyond.

In 2024, Privateer Space acquired Orbital Insight, a satellite imagery analytics company, following Series A Funding. Jah has authored a number of academic papers, including Entropy-based approach for uncertainty propagation of nonlinear dynamical systems. Jah previously worked as a spacecraft navigator at NASA's Jet Propulsion Laboratory, where he was involved in navigation for the Mars Global Surveyor, Mars Odyssey, Mars Express, Mars Exploration Rover, and the Mars Reconnaissance Orbiter. He is a Fellow of the American Astronautical Society, the Air Force Research Laboratory, the International Association for the Advancement of Space Safety, and the Royal Astronomical Society. Jah was selected for the 10th anniversary class of TED Fellows and was named a MacArthur Fellow in 2022. He also was selected for the AIAA class of Fellows and Honorary Fellows in the year of the 50th Anniversary of Apollo 11. Jah's work has been featured in Nature, Popular Science, and National Geographic.

== Early life and education ==
Jah was born in San Francisco, California, to Elsie Turnier from Port-Au-Prince, Haiti, and Abraham Jah from Pujehun, Sierra Leone. Jah's parents divorced when he was two years old. He moved to Venezuela at the age of six. After graduating, Jah moved back to the United States and enlisted in the United States Air Force where he served as a Security Policeman.

Following his enlistment, he studied Aerospace Engineering at Embry–Riddle Aeronautical University in Prescott Arizona and earned a bachelor's degree in 1999. He was inspired to become an astrodynamicist by Ron Madler. He later spent a year at the Los Alamos National Laboratory working on space mission design. He then spent two years at Microcosm, performing the orbital analysis for several satellite constellations.

He went to the University of Colorado Boulder for his graduate studies, earning a master's in 2001 and PhD, under the supervision of George Born, in 2005. During his PhD he worked at the Jet Propulsion Laboratory as a navigation engineer, developing the navigation algorithms and performing orbit determination for several missions, including the Mars Global Surveyor, Mars Odyssey and Mars Exploration Rover. His doctoral thesis looked at aerobraking spacecraft, using an Unscented Kalman Filter to estimate the spacecraft trajectory to explore ways to automate aerobraking operations.

In 2006, Jah left NASA JPL and became a senior scientist at Oceanit Laboratories on Maui, which involved using optical data to determine space trajectories. He was then awarded the NASA Space Act Award for his work on the Inertial Measurements for Aero-assisted Navigation (IMAN), in 2007.

== Career ==
In 2007 Jah joined the Air Force Research Laboratory (AFRL). He directed the AFRL Advanced Sciences and Technology Research Institute for Astronautics (ASTRIA) in Maui from 2007 to 2010 and then at Kirtland Air Force Base in New Mexico until 2014. At Kirtland Air Force Base, Jah was mission lead in Space Situational Awareness and advised the satellite guidance and control program.

He left in 2016 to become an associate professor at the University of Arizona. He served as director of the University of Arizona's Space Object Behavioral Sciences initiative. There he developed techniques to track and understand the 23,000+ synthetic objects inside Earth's orbit, (of which only 1,500 are operational).In 2017, Jah joined the Department of Aerospace Engineering and Engineering Mechanics at the University of Texas at Austin. There he focused on building models of space debris that quantify the space object population.

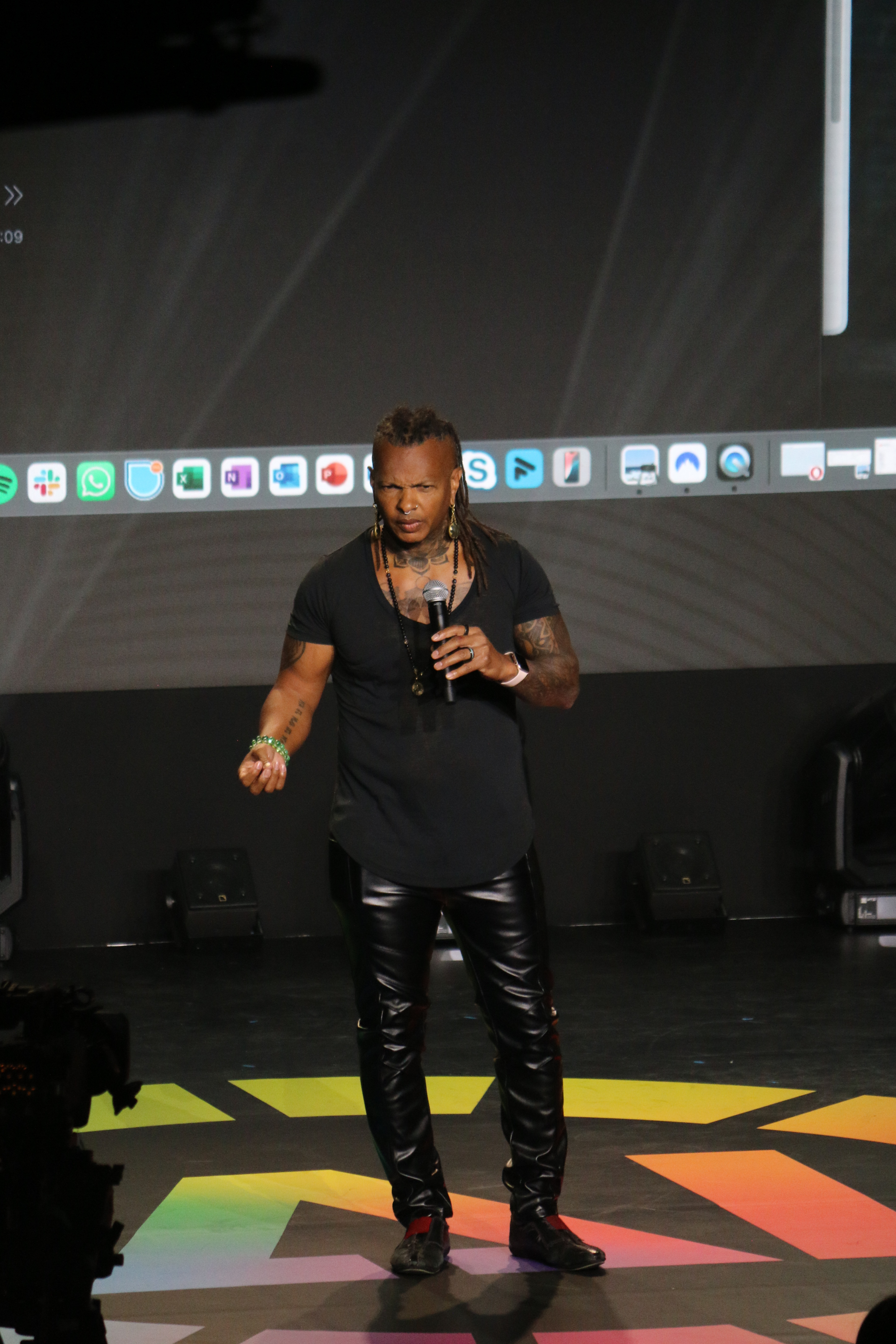
Jah at the 2025 AI for Good Summit in Geneva

Jah has stated that the United States Strategic Command cannot accurately track all satellites, and their current data could be biased, noisy and corrupt. He gave formal congressional testimony to the Federal government of the United States in 2017, discussing a Civil Space Traffic Management system. He stated that he believes that the USSC should create a global, accessible, and transparent space traffic management system, which would protect spacecraft from debris and a lack of monitoring.

Jah has served as a member of the delegation at the United Nations Committee on the Peaceful Uses of Outer Space and chairs the NATO SCI-279-TG activity on Space Domain Awareness. He was appointed as Core Faculty to the University of Texas at Austin Institute for Computational Engineering and Sciences in 2018 where he directs the Computational Astronautical Sciences and Technologies group (CAST). He has discussed astrodynamics and space policy on NPR, The BBC and National Geographic.

At The University of Texas at Austin, Jah is a Distinguished Scholar with the Robert S. Strauss Center for International Security and Law. In 2024, Jah was promoted to full professor. Jah's published works include the areas of space situational awareness, space traffic management, spacecraft navigation, space surveillance and tracking, multi-source information fusion, and intersection with space security and safety. He has previously served as associate editor of the IEEE Transactions on Aerospace and Electronic Systems and is currently for the Elsevier Advances in Space Research. In 2021, Jah co-founded Privateer Space with Steve Wozniak and Alex Fielding, where he serves as chief scientist.

On January 5 2023, Jah was appointed by the Secretary of Defense to the U.S. Air Force Scientific Advisory Board.

In recent news, Jah served as the lead researcher to pass a grant at the University of Texas at Austin allowing them to be the first university to establish a Space Domain Awareness (SDA) Tools, Applications, and Processing (TAP) Lab based on an academic foundation.

== Awards, elections and fellowships ==
Year	Award
2001	NASA Group Achievement Award and Aviation Week & Space Technology Laurel Award "for the superb navigation of the Mars Odyssey spacecraft to Mars"
2010	Elected to Senior Member of the Institute of Electrical and Electronics Engineers
2011	Elected to Associate Fellow of the American Institute of Aeronautics and Astronautics
2013	Air Force Research Laboratory, Space Vehicles Directorate Technology Transfer/Transition Achievement Award
2014	Elected to Fellow of the Royal Astronomical Society
2014	Elected to Fellow of the American Astronautical Society
2015	Elected to Fellow of the International Association for the Advancement of Space Safety
2015	Elected to Fellow of the Air Force Research Laboratory
2016	University of Colorado Distinguished Engineering Alumni Award (DEAA)
2018	Elected as Corresponding Member of the International Academy of Astronautics
2019	Selected as TED Fellow
2019	Conferred as Fellow by the American Institute of Aeronautics and Astronautics "For thought leadership and innovative technical contributions in the fields of space situational awareness, space traffic management, and astrodynamics."
2019	Selected as one of 25 "People racing to save us" of WIRED25 by the Wired (magazine) "
2020	Selected as a Public Voices Fellow by the Op-Ed Project
2022	MacArthur Fellow
2023	Elected as Corresponding Fellow of the Royal Society of Edinburgh
