= Privateer Space =

American space company

Privateer Space is an American space company founded by Steve Wozniak, Moriba Jah and Alex Fielding. The company has a product called Wayfinder which provides data for space debris and spacecraft. Privateer is based in the US state of Hawaii.

== History ==
Privateer Space was founded in 2021 by Steve Wozniak, Moriba Jah and Alex Fielding. The company was announced with little information by Wozniak and Fielding in September 2021. Due to the lack of information provided about the company, some people thought that it would be capturing space debris, but the company was instead made to provide data about space debris, described by Fielding as the "Google Maps of space". Jah was not with the company when it first started; he was hired as the chief scientific adviser in November 2021.

The first product the company released is Wayfinder, which allows for the tracking of space debris and spacecraft in space.

The company is making satellites called Pono, where customers can hire and share them after they had already been launched into space and use them to collect data about the Earth, a feature that has been described as "data ride-sharing". In late 2023, the company launched a satellite, named Pono 1, into space. In 2021 it was reported that the satellite was expected to stay in space for four months. In 2023 it was reported that a second iteration of Pono would be launched in mid 2024.

In early 2024, Privateer acquired the geospatial insight company Orbital Insight. In April 2024 the company raised US$56.5 million in a Series A funding round.

== See also ==
- Kessler syndrome – Theoretical satellite collision cascade
