= Spaceflight =

Flight into or through outer space

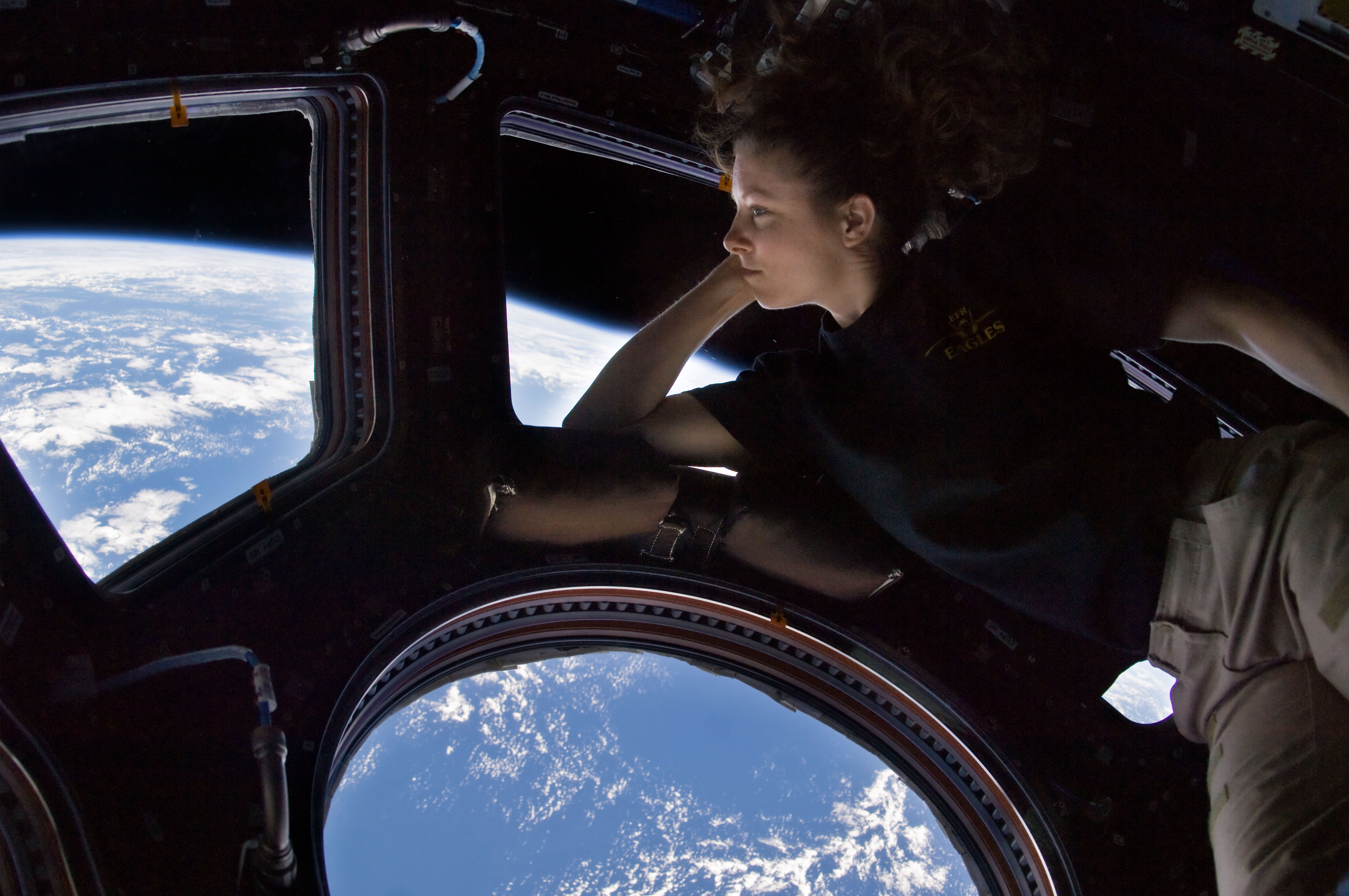
Tracy Caldwell Dyson in the International Space Station's Cupola

Spaceflight (also space flight) is an application of astronautics to fly objects, usually spacecraft, into or through outer space, either with or without humans on board. Most spaceflight is uncrewed and conducted mainly with spacecraft such as satellites in orbit around Earth, but also includes space probes for flights beyond Earth orbit. Such spaceflights operate either by telerobotic or autonomous control. The first spaceflights began in the 1950s with the launches of the Soviet Sputnik satellites and American Explorer and Vanguard missions. Human spaceflight programs include the Soyuz, Shenzhou, the past Apollo Moon landing and the Space Shuttle programs. Other current spaceflight are conducted to the International Space Station and to China's Tiangong Space Station.

Spaceflights include the launches of Earth observation and telecommunications satellites, interplanetary missions, the rendezvouses and dockings with space stations, and crewed spaceflights on scientific or tourist missions.

Spaceflight can be achieved conventionally via multistage rockets, which provide the thrust to overcome the force of gravity and propel spacecraft onto suborbital trajectories. If the mission is orbital, the spacecraft usually separates the first stage and ignites the second stage, which propels the spacecraft to high enough speeds that it reaches orbit. Once in orbit, spacecraft are at high enough speeds that they fall around the Earth rather than fall back to the surface.

Most spacecraft, and all crewed spacecraft, are designed to deorbit themselves or, in the case of uncrewed spacecraft in high-energy orbits, to boost themselves into graveyard orbits. Used upper stages or failed spacecraft, however, often lack the ability to deorbit themselves. This becomes a major issue when large numbers of uncontrollable spacecraft exist in frequently used orbits, increasing the risk of debris colliding with functional satellites. This problem is exacerbated when large objects, often upper stages, break up in orbit or collide with other objects, creating often hundreds of small, hard to find pieces of debris. This problem of continuous collisions is known as Kessler syndrome.

== Terminology ==
There are several terms that refer to a flight into or through outer space.

A space mission refers to a spaceflight intended to achieve an objective. Objectives for space missions may include space exploration, space research, and national firsts in spaceflight.

Space transport is the use of spacecraft to transport people or cargo into or through outer space. This may include human spaceflight and cargo spacecraft flight.

== History ==
The first theoretical proposal of space travel using rockets was published by Scottish astronomer and mathematician William Leitch, in an 1861 essay "A Journey Through Space". More well-known is Konstantin Tsiolkovsky's work, "Исследование мировых пространств реактивными приборами" (The Exploration of Cosmic Space by Means of Reaction Devices), published in 1903. In his work, Tsiolkovsky describes the fundamental rocket equation:

$\Delta v = v_e \ln \frac{m_0}{m_f}$

Where:

- ($\Delta v$) is the change in the rocket's velocity
- ($v_e$) is the exhaust velocity
- ($m_0$) and ($m_f$) are the initial and final masses of the rocket

This equation, known as the Tsiolkovsky rocket equation, can be used to find the total $\Delta v$, or potential change in velocity. This formula, which is still used by engineers, is a key concept of spaceflight.

Spaceflight became a practical possibility with the work of Robert H. Goddard's publication in 1919 of his paper A Method of Reaching Extreme Altitudes. His application of the de Laval nozzle to liquid-fuel rockets improved efficiency enough for interplanetary travel to become possible. After further research, Goddard attempted to secure an Army contract for a rocket-propelled weapon in the first World War but his plans were foiled by the November 11, 1918 armistice with Germany. After choosing to work with private financial support, he was the first to launch a liquid-fueled rocket on March 16, 1926.

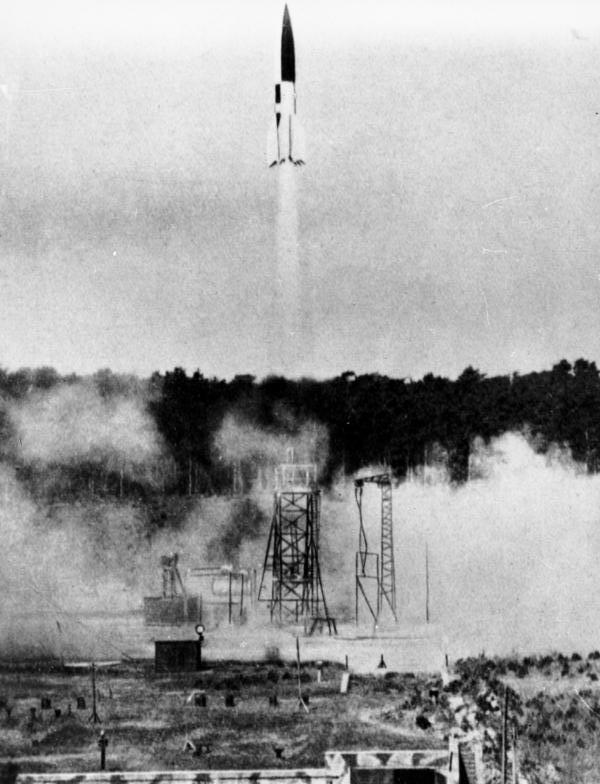
The German V-2 rocket, co-designed by Wernher von Braun, became the first man-made object to reach space.

During World War II, the first guided rocket, the V-2, was developed and employed as a weapon by Nazi Germany. During a test flight in June 1944, one such rocket reached space at an altitude of 189 kilometers (102 nautical miles), becoming the first human-made object to reach space. At the end of World War II, most of the V-2 rocket team, including its head, Wernher von Braun, surrendered to the United States, and were expatriated to work on American missiles at what became the Army Ballistic Missile Agency, producing missiles such as Juno I and Atlas. The Soviet Union, in turn, captured several V2 production facilities and built several replicas, with 5 of their 11 rockets successfully reaching their targets. (This was relatively consistent with Nazi Germany's success rate.)

The Soviet Union developed intercontinental ballistic missiles to carry nuclear weapons as a counter measure to United States bomber planes in the 1950s. The Tsiolkovsky-influenced Sergey Korolev became the chief rocket designer, and derivatives of his R-7 Semyorka missiles were used to launch the world's first artificial Earth satellite, Sputnik 1, on October 4, 1957.

The U.S., after the launch of Sputnik and two embarrassing failures of Vanguard rockets, launched Explorer 1 on February 1, 1958. Three years later, the USSR launched Vostok 1, carrying cosmonaut Yuri Gagarin into orbit. The US responded with the suborbital launch of Alan Shepard on May 5, 1961, and the orbital launch of John Glenn on February 20, 1962. These events were followed by a pledge from U.S. President John F. Kennedy to go to the moon and the creation of the Gemini and Apollo programs. After successfully performing a rendezvous and docking and an EVA, the Gemini program ended just before the Apollo 1 tragedy. Following multiple uncrewed test flights of the Saturn 1B and the Saturn V, the U.S. launched the crewed Apollo 7 mission into low Earth orbit. Shortly after its successful completion, the U.S. launched Apollo 8 (first mission to orbit the Moon), Apollo 9 (first Apollo mission to launch with both the CSM and the LEM) and Apollo 10 (first mission to nearly land on the Moon). These events culminated with the first crewed Moon landing, Apollo 11, and six subsequent missions, five of which successfully landed on the Moon.

Spaceflight has been widely employed by numerous government and commercial entities for placing satellites into orbit around Earth for a broad range of purposes. Certain government agencies have also sent uncrewed spacecraft exploring space beyond the Moon and developed continuous crewed human presence in space with a series of space stations, ranging from the Salyut program to the International Space Station.

== Phases ==
=== Launch ===
Rockets are the only means currently capable of reaching orbit or beyond. Other non-rocket spacelaunch technologies have yet to be built, or remain short of orbital speeds. A rocket launch for a spaceflight usually starts from a spaceport (cosmodrome), which may be equipped with launch complexes and launch pads for vertical rocket launches and runways for takeoff and landing of carrier airplanes and winged spacecraft. Spaceports are situated well away from human habitation for noise and safety reasons. ICBMs have various special launching facilities.

A launch is often restricted to certain launch windows. These windows depend upon the position of celestial bodies and orbits relative to the launch site. The biggest influence is often the rotation of the Earth. Once launched, orbits are normally located within relatively constant flat planes at a fixed angle to the axis of the Earth, and the Earth rotates within this orbit.

A launch pad is a fixed structure designed to dispatch airborne vehicles. It generally consists of a launch tower and flame trench. It is surrounded by equipment used to erect, fuel, and maintain launch vehicles. Before launch, the rocket can weigh hundreds of tons. The Space Shuttle Columbia, on STS-1, weighed 2030 metric tons (4,480,000 lb) at takeoff.

=== Reaching space ===
The most commonly used definition of outer space is everything beyond the Kármán line, which is 100 kilometers (62 mi) above the Earth's surface. (The United States defines outer space as everything beyond 50 miles (80 km) in altitude.)

Rocket engines remain the only currently practical means of reaching space, with planes and high-altitude balloons failing due to lack of atmosphere and alternatives such as space elevators not yet being built. Chemical propulsion, or the acceleration of gases at high velocities, is effective mainly because of its ability to sustain thrust even as the atmosphere thins.

==== Alternatives ====
Many ways to reach space other than rocket engines have been proposed. Ideas such as the space elevator, and momentum exchange tethers like rotovators or skyhooks require new materials much stronger than any currently known. Electromagnetic launchers such as launch loops might be feasible with current technology. Other ideas include rocket-assisted aircraft/spaceplanes such as Reaction Engines Skylon (currently in early stage development), scramjet powered spaceplanes, and RBCC powered spaceplanes. Gun launch has been proposed for cargo.

=== Leaving orbit ===
On some missions beyond Low Earth orbit, spacecraft are inserted into parking orbits, or lower intermediary orbits. The parking orbit approach greatly simplified Apollo mission planning in several important ways. It acted as a "time buffer" and substantially widened the allowable launch windows. The parking orbit gave the crew and controllers time to thoroughly check out the spacecraft after the stresses of launch before committing it for a long journey to the Moon.

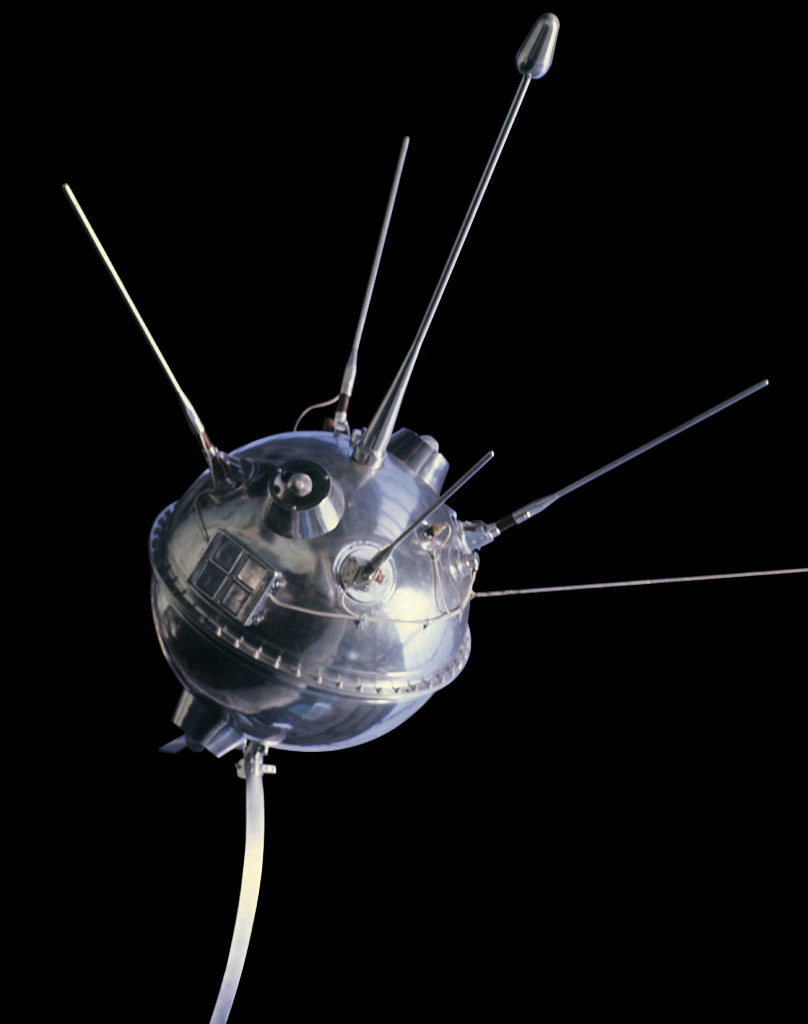
Launched in 1959, Luna 1 was the first known artificial object to achieve escape velocity from the Earth (replica pictured).

Robotic missions do not require an abort capability and require radiation minimalization only for delicate electronics, and because modern launchers routinely meet "instantaneous" launch windows, space probes to the Moon and other planets generally use direct injection to maximize performance by limiting the boil off of cryogenic propellants. Although some might coast briefly during the launch sequence, they do not complete one or more full parking orbits before the burn that injects them onto an Earth escape trajectory.

The escape velocity from a celestial body decreases as the distance from the body increases. However, it is more fuel-efficient for a craft to burn its fuel as close as possible to its periapsis (lowest point); see Oberth effect.

=== Astrodynamics ===
Astrodynamics is the study of spacecraft trajectories, particularly as they relate to gravitational and propulsion effects. Astrodynamics allows for a spacecraft to arrive at its destination at the correct time without excessive propellant use. An orbital maneuvering system may be needed to maintain or change orbits.

Non-rocket orbital propulsion methods include solar sails, magnetic sails, plasma-bubble magnetic systems, and using gravitational slingshot effects.

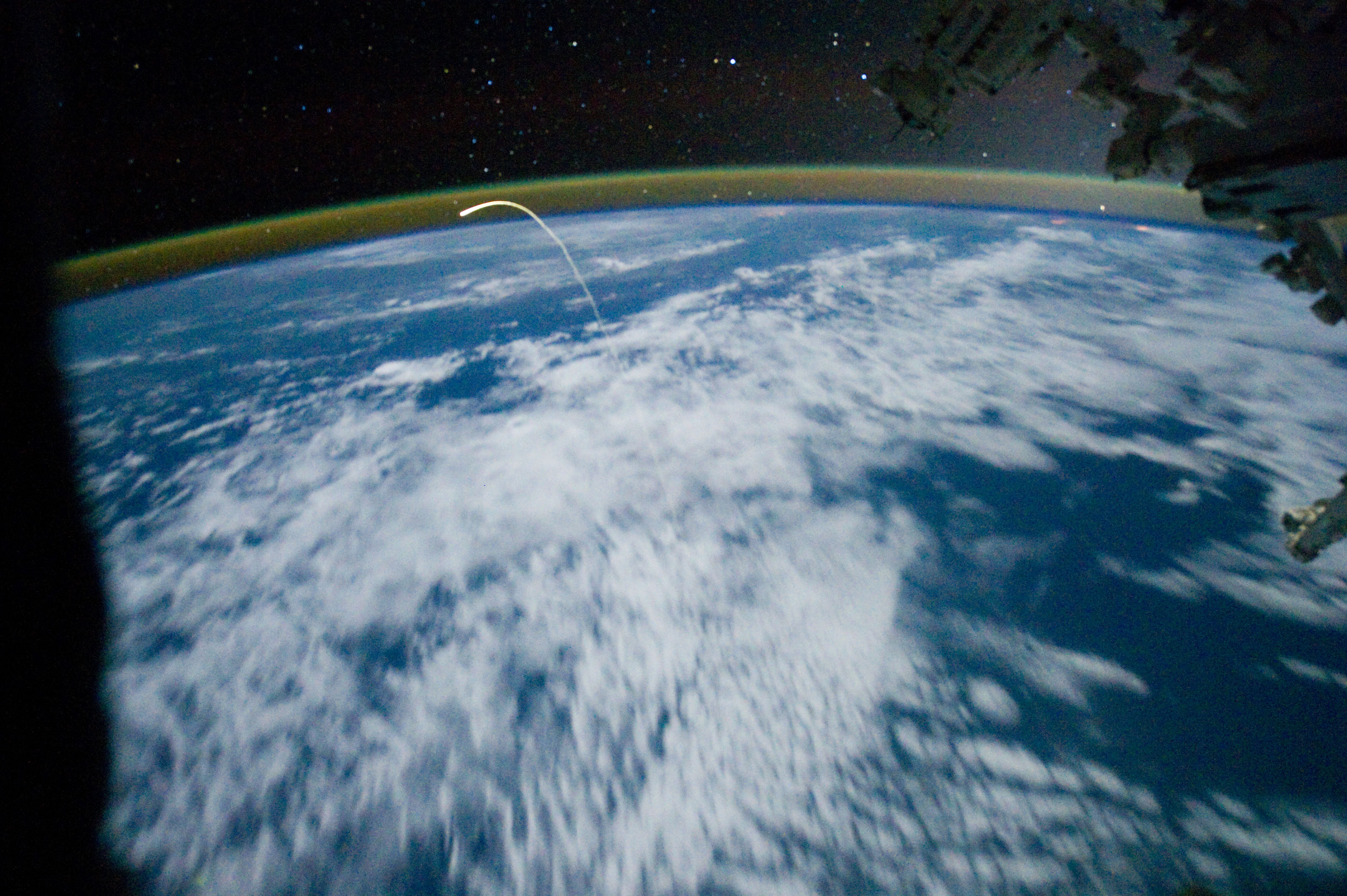
Ionized gas trail from Shuttle reentry

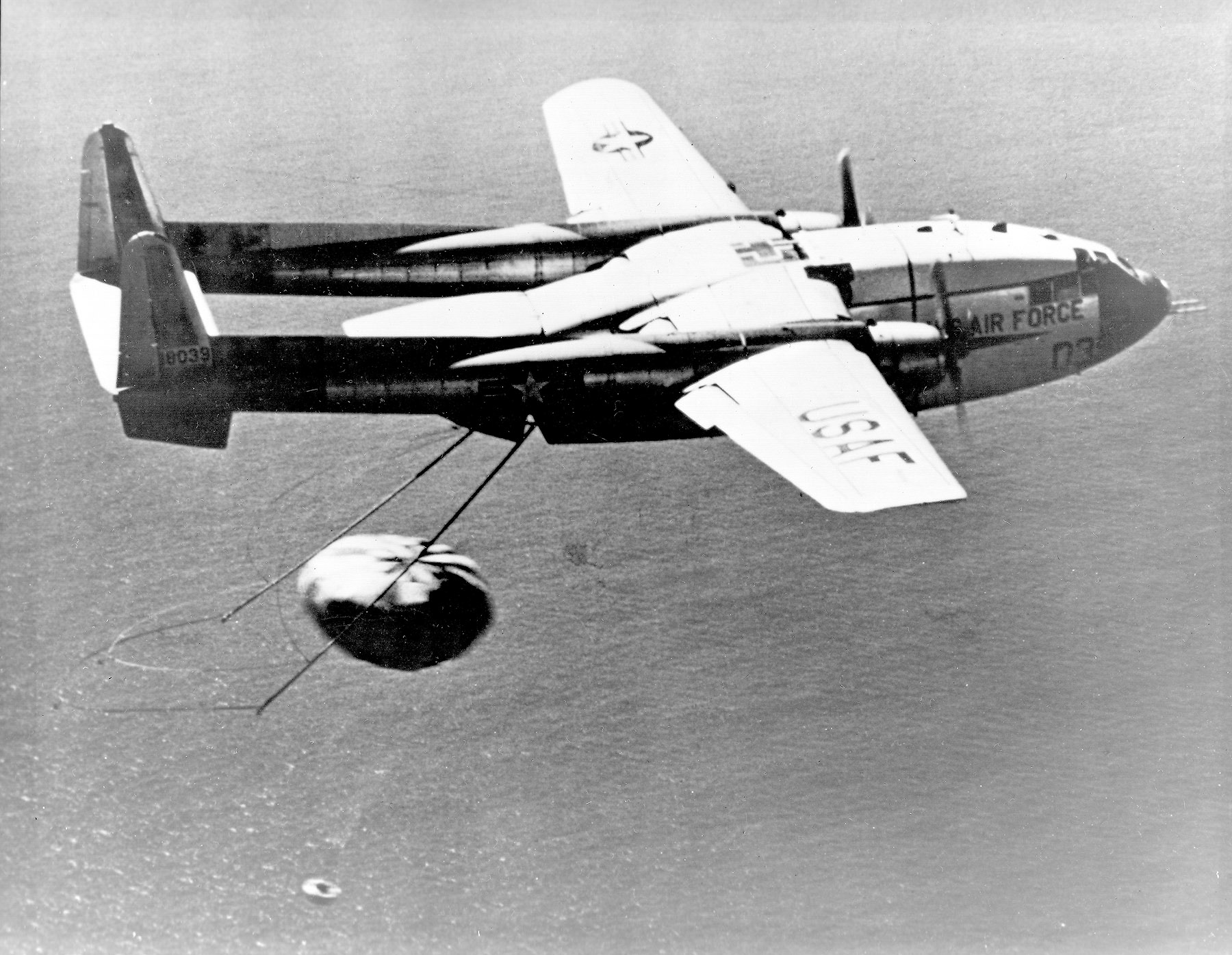
Recovery of Discoverer 14 return capsule by a C-119 airplane

=== Transfer energy ===
The term "transfer energy" means the total amount of energy imparted by a rocket stage to its payload. This can be the energy imparted by a first stage of a launch vehicle to an upper stage plus payload, or by an upper stage or spacecraft kick motor to a spacecraft.

=== Reaching space station ===
In order to reach a space station, a spacecraft would have to arrive at the same orbit and approach to a very close distance (e.g. within visual contact). This is done by a set of orbital maneuvers called space rendezvous.

After rendezvousing with the space station, the space vehicle then docks or berths with the station. Docking refers to joining of two separate free-flying space vehicles, while berthing refers to mating operations where an inactive vehicle is placed into the mating interface of another space vehicle by using a robotic arm.

=== Reentry ===
Vehicles in orbit have large amounts of kinetic energy. This energy must be discarded if the vehicle is to land safely without vaporizing in the atmosphere. Typically this process requires special methods to protect against aerodynamic heating. The theory behind reentry was developed by Harry Julian Allen. Based on this theory, reentry vehicles present blunt shapes to the atmosphere for reentry. Blunt shapes mean that less than 1% of the kinetic energy ends up as heat reaching the vehicle, and the remainder heats the atmosphere.

=== Landing and recovery ===
The Mercury, Gemini, and Apollo capsules splashed down in the sea. These capsules were designed to land at relatively low speeds with the help of a parachute. Soviet/Russian capsules for Soyuz make use of a big parachute and braking rockets to touch down on land. Spaceplanes like the Space Shuttle land like a glider.

After a successful landing, the spacecraft, its occupants, and cargo can be recovered. In some cases, recovery has occurred before landing: while a spacecraft is still descending on its parachute, it can be snagged by a specially designed aircraft. This mid-air retrieval technique was used to recover the film canisters from the Corona spy satellites.

== Types ==
=== Uncrewed ===
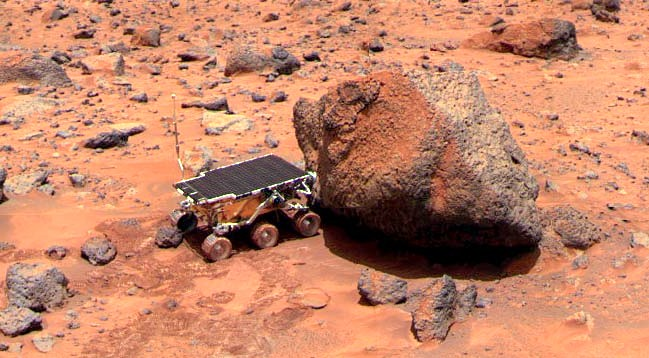
Sojourner takes its Alpha particle X-ray spectrometer measurement of Yogi Rock on Mars.

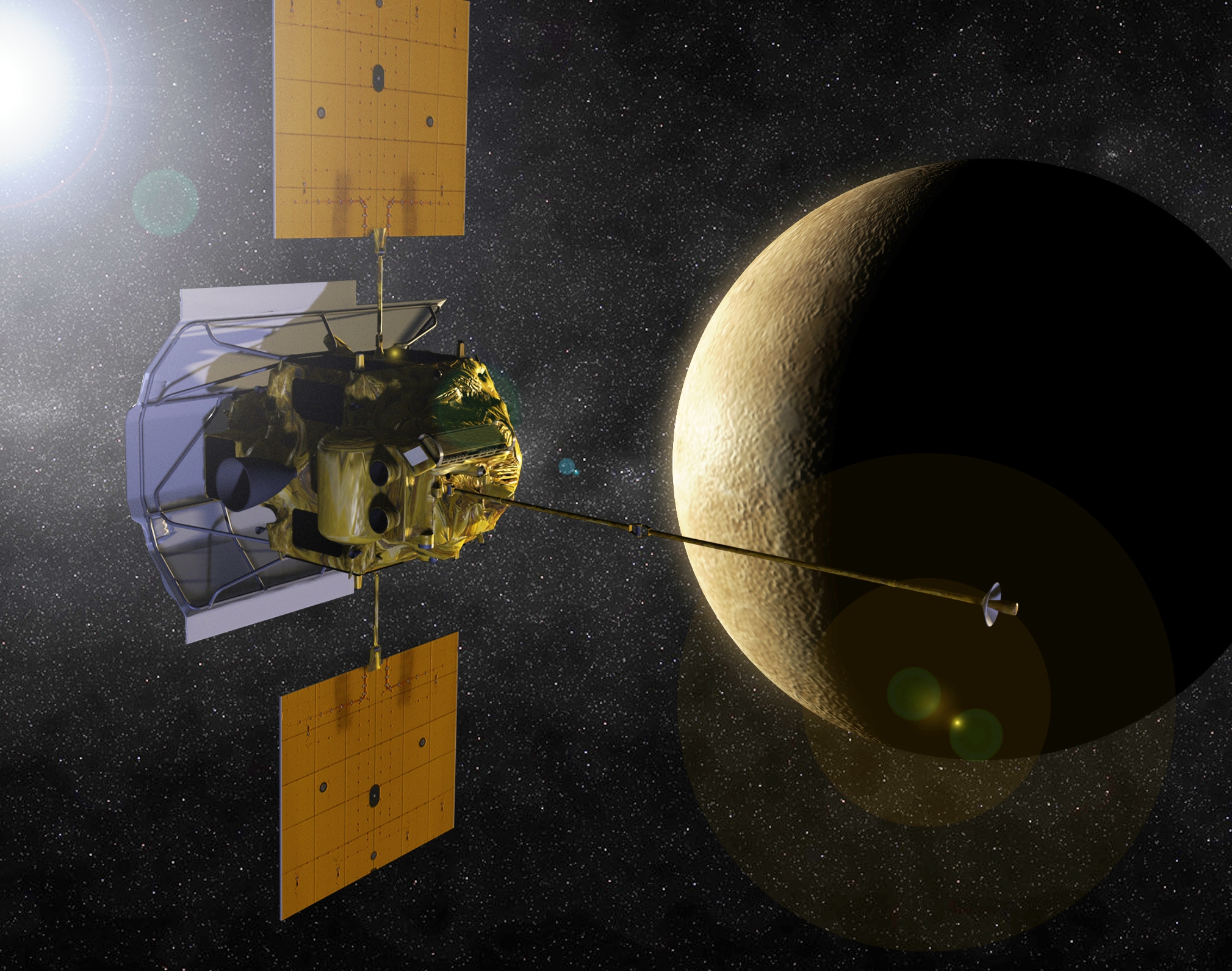
The MESSENGER spacecraft at Mercury (artist's interpretation)

Uncrewed spacecraft or robotic spacecraft are spacecraft without people on board. Uncrewed spacecraft may have varying levels of autonomy from human input, such as remote control, or remote guidance. They may also be autonomous, in which they have a pre-programmed list of operations that will be executed unless otherwise instructed. A robotic spacecraft for scientific measurements is often called a space probe or space observatory.

Many space missions are more suited to telerobotic rather than crewed operation, due to lower cost and risk factors. In addition, some planetary destinations such as Venus or the vicinity of Jupiter are too hostile for human survival, given current technology. Outer planets such as Saturn, Uranus, and Neptune are too distant to reach with current crewed spaceflight technology, so telerobotic probes are the only way to explore them. Telerobotics also allows exploration of regions that are vulnerable to contamination by Earth micro-organisms since spacecraft can be sterilized. Humans can not be sterilized in the same way as a spaceship, as they coexist with numerous micro-organisms, and these micro-organisms are also hard to contain within a spaceship or spacesuit.

The first uncrewed space mission was Sputnik, launched October 4, 1957 to orbit the Earth. Nearly all satellites, landers and rovers are robotic spacecraft. Not every uncrewed spacecraft is a robotic spacecraft; for example, a reflector ball is a non-robotic uncrewed spacecraft. Space missions where other animals but no humans are on-board are called uncrewed missions.

Many habitable spacecraft also have varying levels of robotic features. For example, the space stations Salyut 7 and Mir, and the International Space Station module Zarya, were capable of remote guided station-keeping and docking maneuvers with both resupply craft and new modules. Uncrewed resupply spacecraft are increasingly used for crewed space stations.

=== Human ===
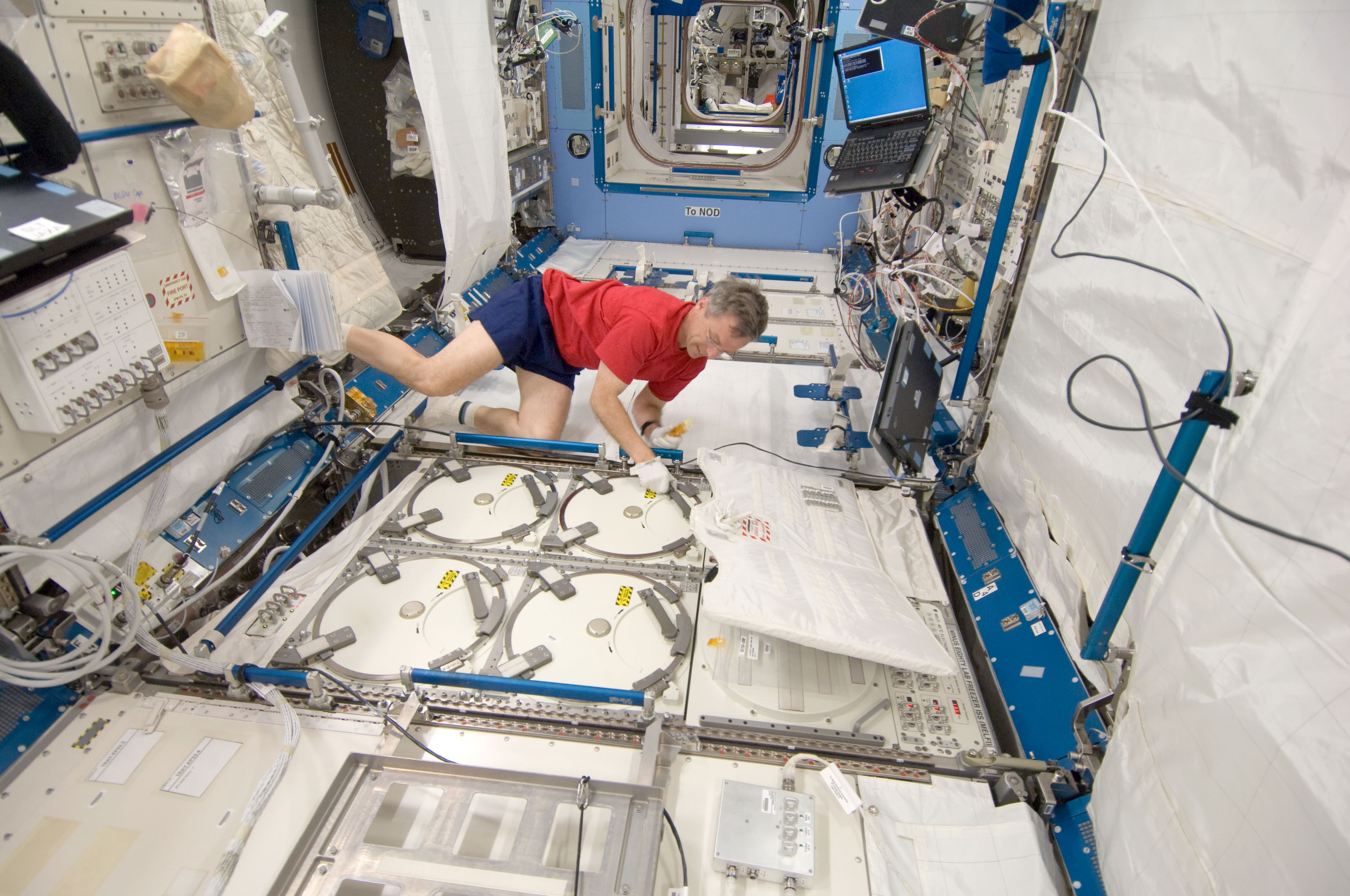
ISS crew member stores samples.

The first human spaceflight was Vostok 1 on April 12, 1961, on which cosmonaut Yuri Gagarin of the USSR made one orbit around the Earth. In official Soviet documents, there is no mention of the fact that Gagarin parachuted the final seven miles. As of 2020, the only spacecraft regularly used for human spaceflight are Soyuz, Shenzhou, and Crew Dragon. The U.S. Space Shuttle fleet operated from April 1981 until July 2011. SpaceShipOne has conducted three human suborbital space flights.

=== Sub-orbital ===
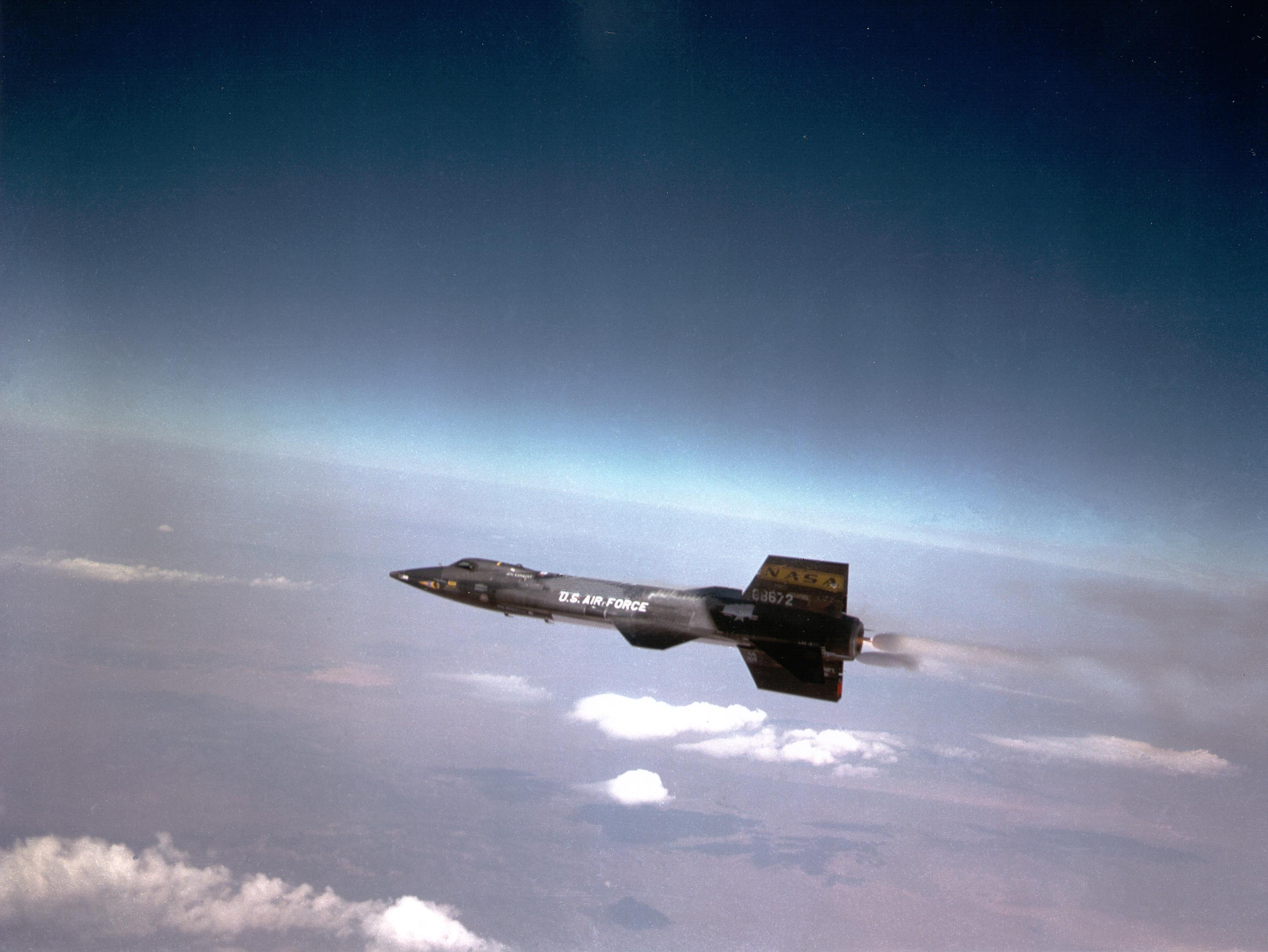
The North American X-15 in flight. X-15 flew above 100 km (62 mi) twice and both of the flights were piloted by Joe Walker (astronaut).

On a sub-orbital spaceflight the spacecraft reaches space and then returns to the atmosphere after following a (primarily) ballistic trajectory. This is usually because of insufficient specific orbital energy, in which case a suborbital flight will last only a few minutes, but it is also possible for an object with enough energy for an orbit to have a trajectory that intersects the Earth's atmosphere, sometimes after many hours. Pioneer 1 was NASA's first space probe intended to reach the Moon. A partial failure caused it to instead follow a suborbital trajectory to an altitude of 113,854 kilometers (70,746 mi) before reentering the Earth's atmosphere 43 hours after launch.

The most generally recognized boundary of space is the Kármán line 100 km (62 mi) above sea level. (NASA alternatively defines an astronaut as someone who has flown more than 80 km (50 mi) above sea level.) It is not generally recognized by the public that the increase in potential energy required to pass the Kármán line is only about 3% of the orbital energy (potential plus kinetic energy) required by the lowest possible Earth orbit (a circular orbit just above the Kármán line.) In other words, it is far easier to reach space than to stay there. On May 17, 2004, Civilian Space eXploration Team launched the GoFast rocket on a suborbital flight, the first amateur spaceflight. On June 21, 2004, SpaceShipOne was used for the first privately funded human spaceflight.

=== Point-to-point ===
Point-to-point, or Earth to Earth transportation, is a category of sub-orbital spaceflight in which a spacecraft provides rapid transport between two terrestrial locations. A conventional airline route between London and Sydney, a flight that normally lasts over twenty hours, could be traversed in less than one hour. While no company offers this type of transportation today, SpaceX has revealed plans to do so as early as the 2020s using Starship. Suborbital spaceflight over an intercontinental distance requires a vehicle velocity that is only a little lower than the velocity required to reach low Earth orbit. If rockets are used, the size of the rocket relative to the payload is similar to an Intercontinental Ballistic Missile (ICBM). Any intercontinental spaceflight has to surmount problems of heating during atmospheric re-entry that are nearly as large as those faced by orbital spaceflight.

=== Orbital ===
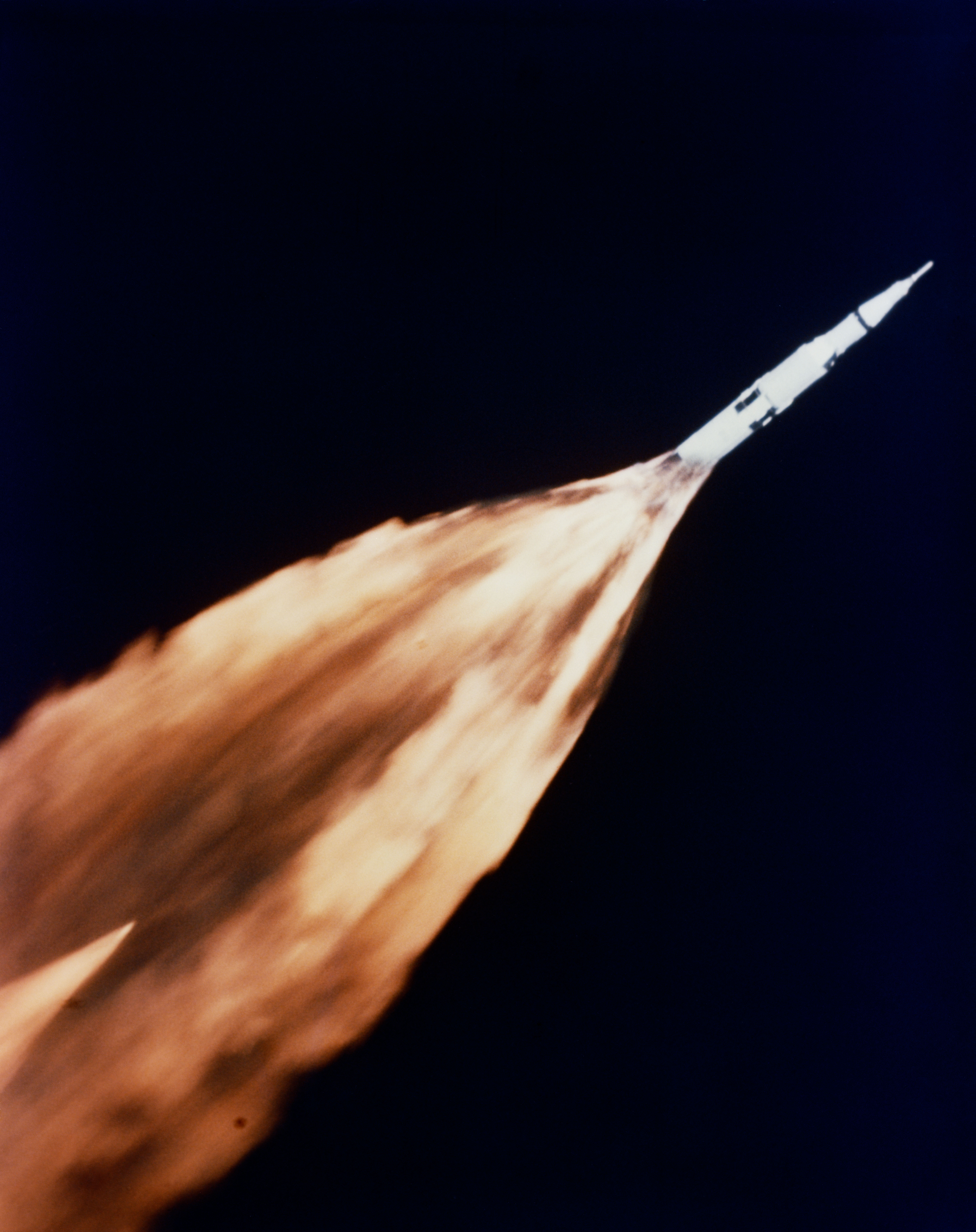
Apollo 6 heads into orbit.

A minimal orbital spaceflight requires much higher velocities than a minimal sub-orbital flight, and so it is technologically much more challenging to achieve. To achieve orbital spaceflight, the tangential velocity around the Earth is as important as altitude. In order to perform a stable and lasting flight in space, the spacecraft must reach the minimal orbital speed required for a closed orbit.

=== Interplanetary ===
Interplanetary spaceflight is flight between planets within a single planetary system. In practice, the use of the term is confined to travel between the planets of the Solar System. Plans for future crewed interplanetary spaceflight missions often include final vehicle assembly in Earth orbit, such as NASA's Constellation program and Russia's Kliper/Parom tandem.

=== Interstellar ===
New Horizons is the fifth spacecraft put on an escape trajectory leaving the Solar System. Voyager 1, Voyager 2, Pioneer 10, Pioneer 11 are the earlier ones. The one farthest from the Sun is Voyager 1, which is more than 100 AU distant and is moving at 3.6 AU per year. In comparison, Proxima Centauri, the closest star other than the Sun, is 267,000 AU distant. It will take Voyager 1 over 74,000 years to reach this distance. Vehicle designs using other techniques, such as nuclear pulse propulsion are likely to be able to reach the nearest star significantly faster. Another possibility that could allow for human interstellar spaceflight is to make use of time dilation, as this would make it possible for passengers in a fast-moving vehicle to travel further into the future while aging very little, in that their great speed slows down the rate of passage of on-board time. However, attaining such high speeds would still require the use of some new, advanced method of propulsion. Dynamic soaring as a way to travel across interstellar space has been proposed as well.

=== Intergalactic ===
Intergalactic travel involves spaceflight between galaxies, and is considered much more technologically demanding than even interstellar travel and, by current engineering terms, is considered science fiction. However, theoretically speaking, there is nothing to conclusively indicate that intergalactic travel is impossible. To date several academics have studied intergalactic travel in a serious manner.

== Spacecraft ==
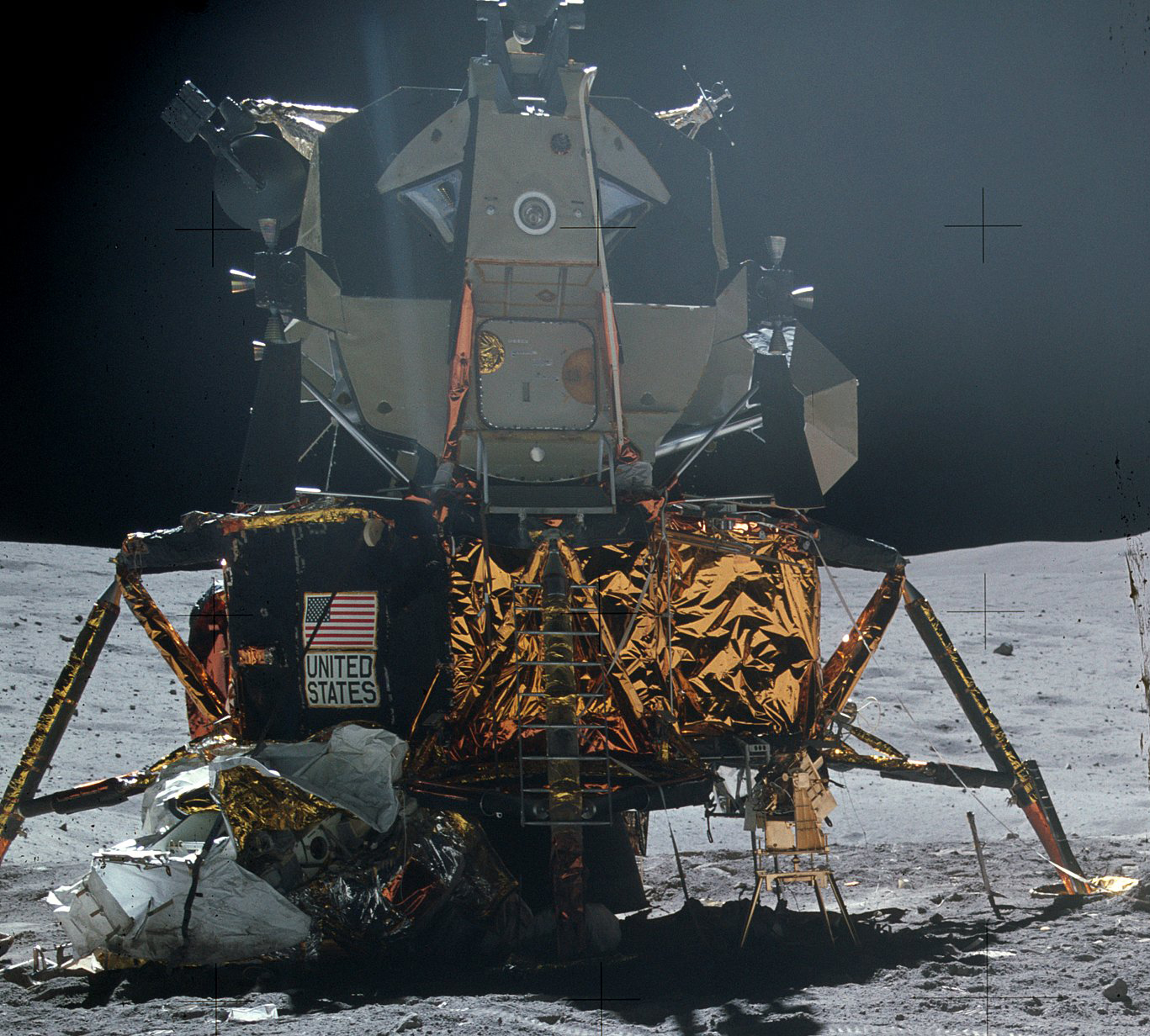
An Apollo Lunar Module on the lunar surface

Spacecraft are vehicles designed to operate in space.

The first 'true spacecraft' is sometimes said to be Apollo Lunar Module, since this was the only crewed vehicle to have been designed for, and operated only in space; and is notable for its non-aerodynamic shape.

=== Propulsion ===
Spacecraft today predominantly use rockets for propulsion, but other propulsion techniques such as ion drives are becoming more common, particularly for uncrewed vehicles, and this can significantly reduce the vehicle's mass and increase its delta-v.

=== Launch systems ===
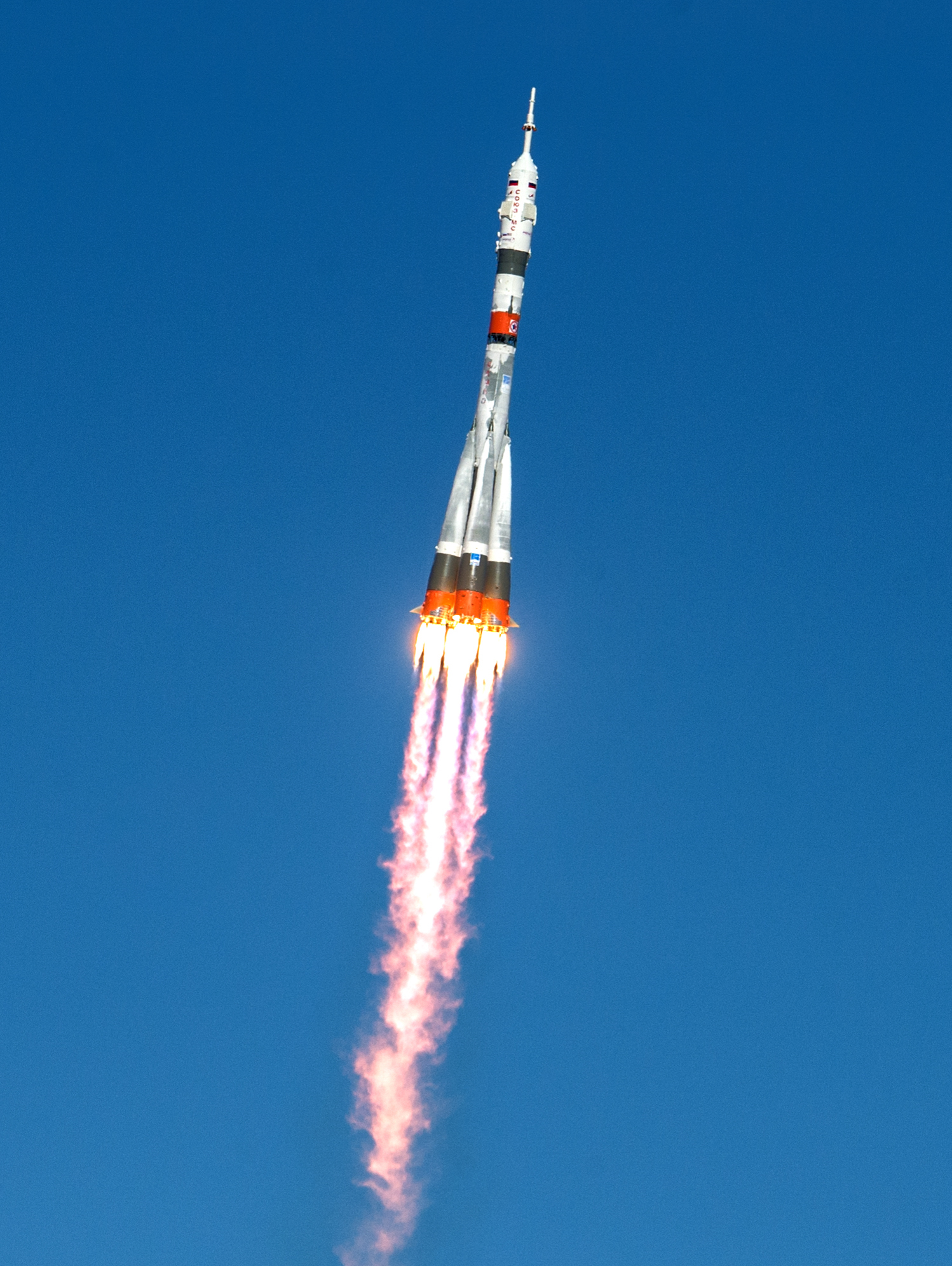
A Russian Soyuz-2.1a rocket sending astronauts to the ISS.

Launch systems are used to carry a payload from Earth's surface into outer space.

==== Expendable ====
Most current spaceflight uses multi-stage expendable launch systems to reach space.

==== Reusable ====
The first reusable spacecraft, the X-15, was air-launched on a suborbital trajectory on 19 July 1963. The first partially reusable orbital spacecraft, the Space Shuttle, was launched by the USA on the 20th anniversary of Yuri Gagarin's flight, on 12 April 1981. During the Shuttle era, six orbiters were built, all of which flown in the atmosphere and five of which flown in space. The Enterprise was used only for approach and landing tests, launching from the back of a Boeing 747 and gliding to deadstick landings at Edwards AFB, California. The first Space Shuttle to fly into space was the Columbia, followed by the Challenger, Discovery, Atlantis, and Endeavour. The Endeavour was built to replace the Challenger, which was lost in January 1986. The Columbia broke up during reentry in February 2003.

The first automatic partially reusable spacecraft was the Buran (Snowstorm), launched by the USSR on 15 November 1988, although it made only one flight. This spaceplane was designed for a crew and strongly resembled the US Space Shuttle, although its drop-off boosters used liquid propellants and its main engines were located at the base of what would be the external tank in the American Shuttle. Lack of funding, complicated by the dissolution of the USSR, prevented any further flights of Buran.

The Space Shuttle was retired in 2011 due mainly to its old age. The Shuttle's human transport role is to be replaced by the SpaceX Dragon 2 and CST-100 in the 2020s. The Shuttle's heavy cargo transport role is now done by commercial launch vehicles.

Scaled Composites SpaceShipOne was a reusable suborbital spaceplane that carried pilots Mike Melvill and Brian Binnie on consecutive flights in 2004 to win the Ansari X Prize. The Spaceship Company has built its successor SpaceShipTwo. A fleet of SpaceShipTwos operated by Virgin Galactic planned to begin reusable private spaceflight carrying paying passengers (space tourists) in 2008, but this was delayed due to an accident in the propulsion development.

SpaceX achieved the first vertical soft landing of a reusable orbital rocket stage on December 21, 2015, after delivering 11 Orbcomm OG-2 commercial satellites into low Earth orbit.

The first Falcon 9 reflight occurred on 30 March 2017. SpaceX now routinely recovers and reuses their first stages and fairings. SpaceX is now developing a fully reusable super heavy lift rocket known as Starship, with the goal of drastically reducing the price of space exploration. As of April 2025, three Super Heavy boosters, the first stage of Starship, have been recovered.

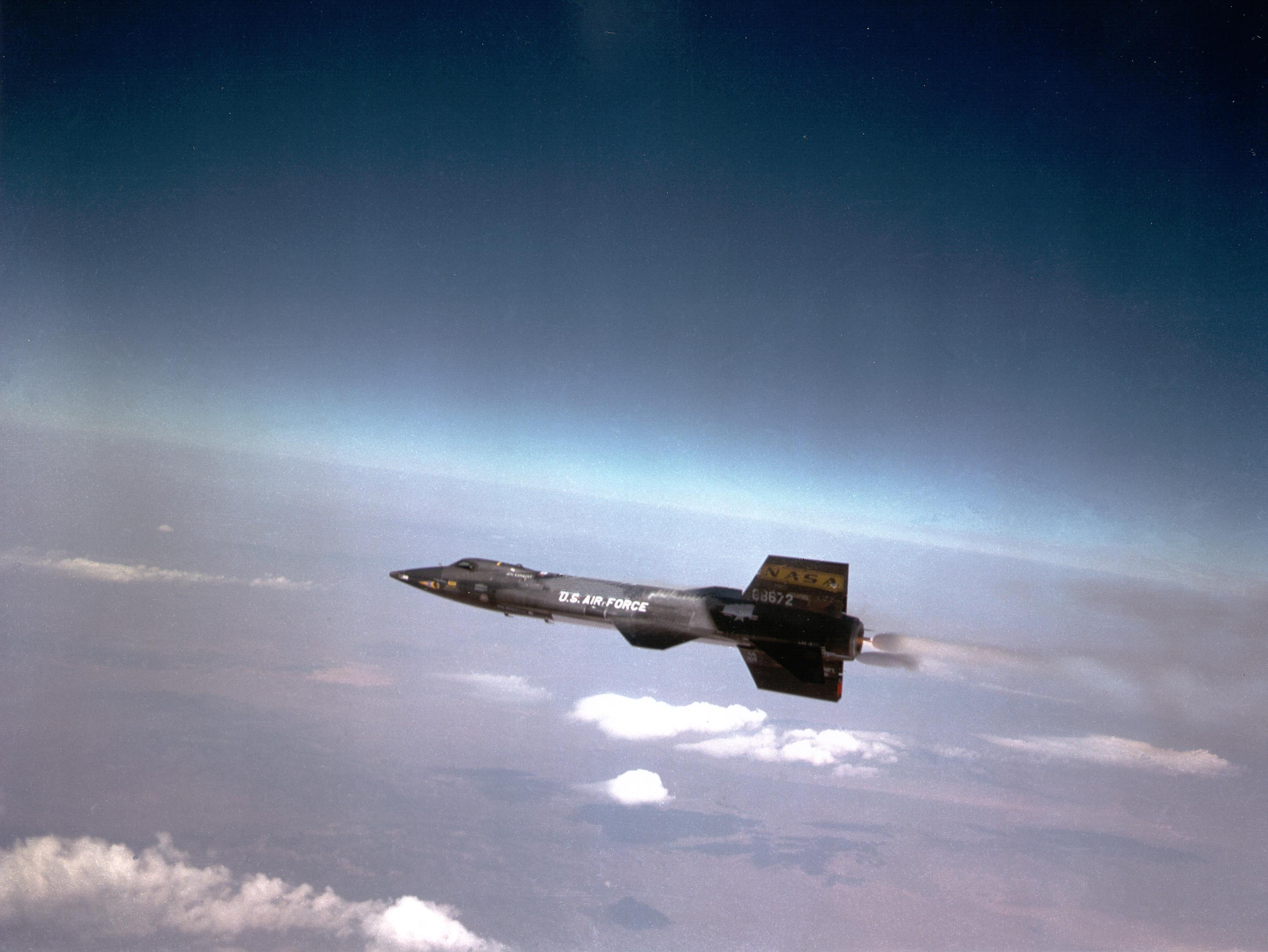
The X-15 pulling away from its drop launch plane

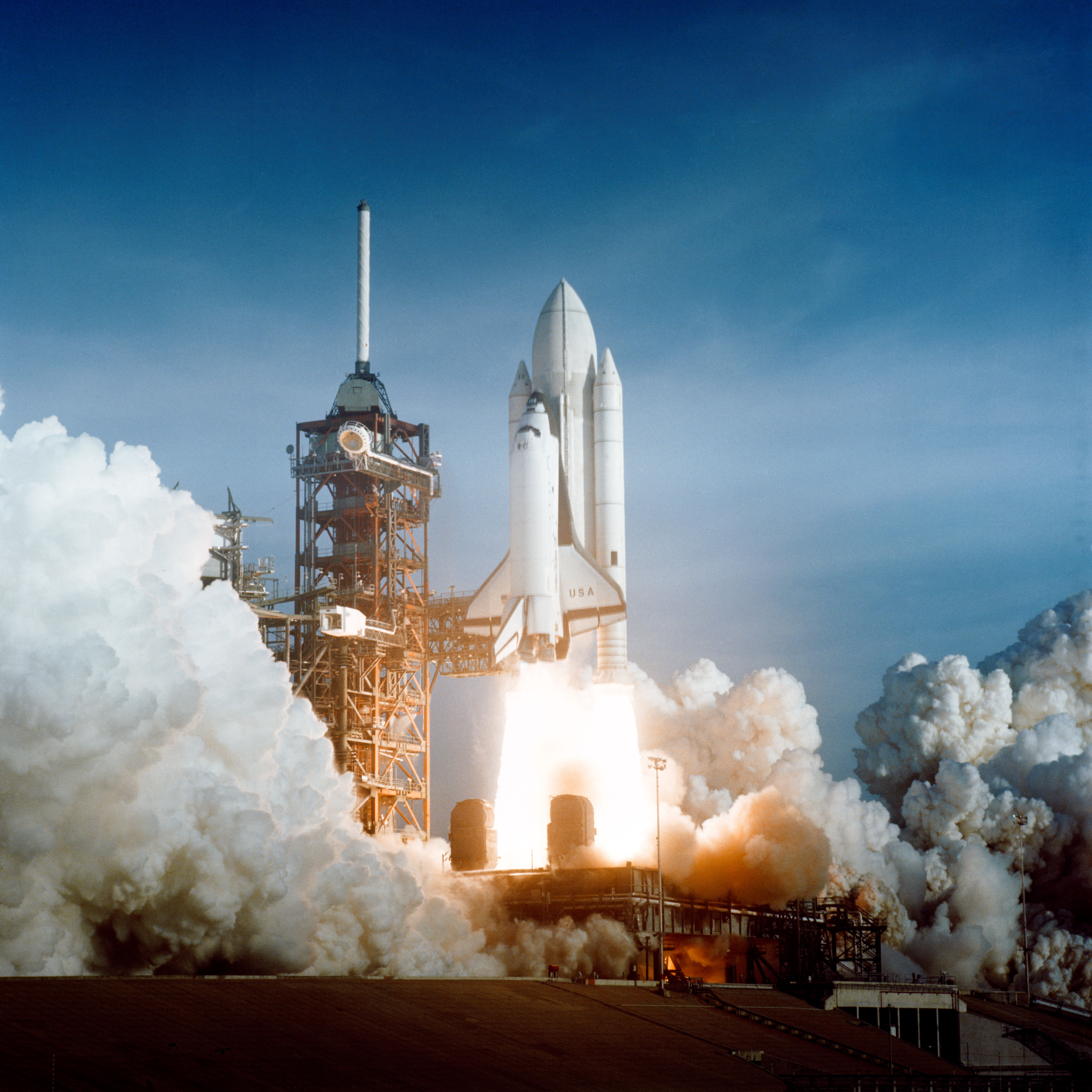
The Space Shuttle Columbia seconds after engine ignition on mission STS-1

SpaceShipOne after its flight into space, 21 June 2004

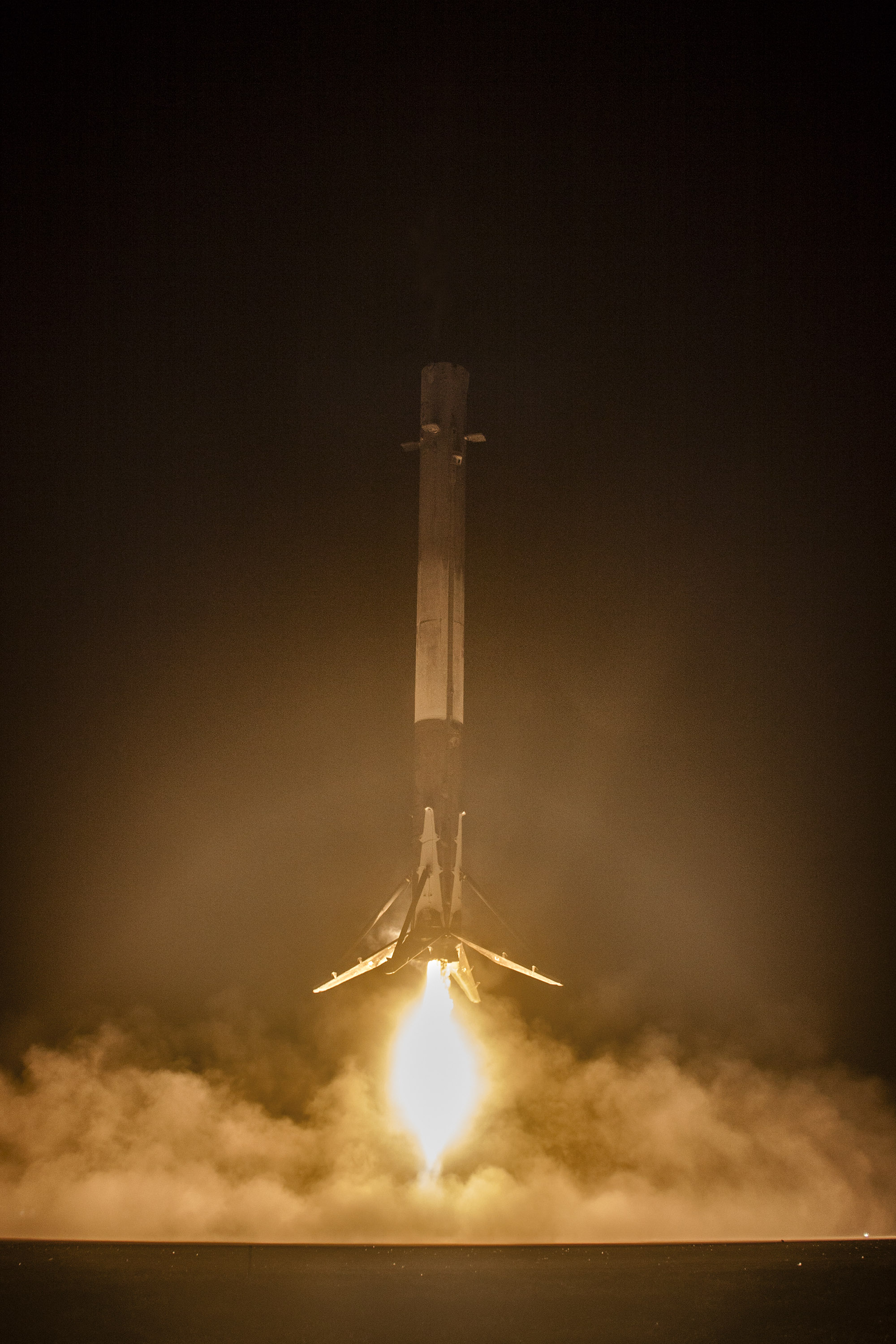
Falcon 9 Flight 20's first stage landing vertically on Landing Zone 1 in December 2015

== Challenges ==
=== Safety ===
All launch vehicles contain a huge amount of energy that is needed for some part of it to reach orbit. There is therefore some risk that this energy can be released prematurely and suddenly, with significant effects. When a Delta II rocket exploded 13 seconds after launch on January 17, 1997, there were reports of store windows 10 miles (16 km) away being broken by the blast.

Space is a fairly predictable environment, but there are still risks of accidental depressurization and the potential failure of equipment, some of which may be very newly developed.

In April 2004 the International Association for the Advancement of Space Safety was established in the Netherlands to further international cooperation and scientific advancement in space systems safety.

=== Weightlessness ===
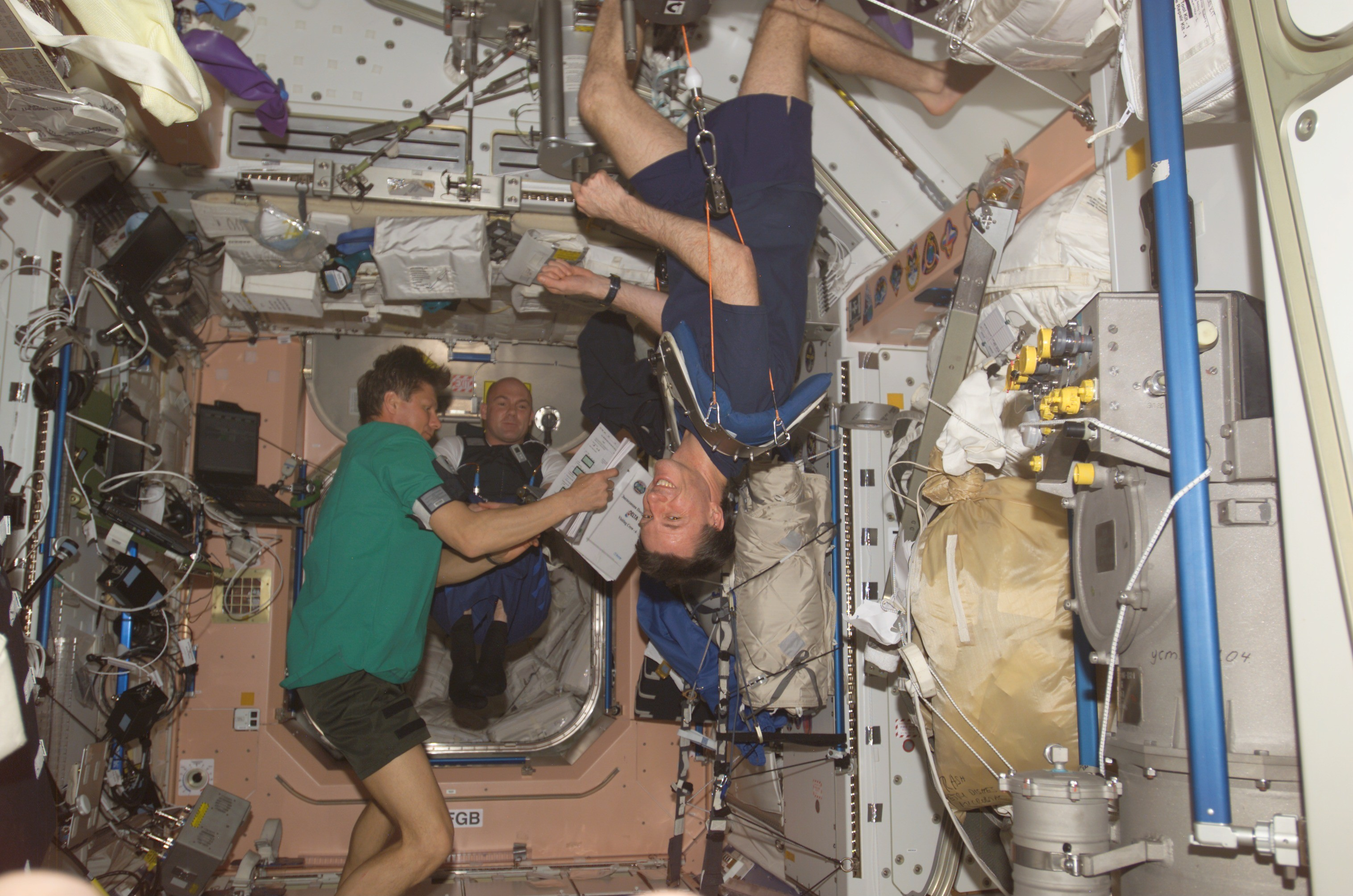
Astronauts on the ISS in weightless conditions. Michael Foale can be seen exercising in the foreground.

In a microgravity environment such as that provided by a spacecraft in orbit around the Earth, humans experience a sense of "weightlessness." Short-term exposure to microgravity causes space adaptation syndrome, a self-limiting nausea caused by derangement of the vestibular system. Long-term exposure causes multiple health issues. The most significant is bone loss, some of which is permanent, but microgravity also leads to significant deconditioning of muscular and cardiovascular tissues.

=== Radiation ===
Once above the atmosphere, radiation due to the Van Allen belts, solar radiation and cosmic radiation issues occur and increase. Further away from the Earth, solar flares can give a fatal radiation dose in minutes, and the health threat from cosmic radiation significantly increases the chances of cancer over a decade exposure or more.

=== Life support ===
In human spaceflight, the life-support system is a group of devices that allow a human being to survive in outer space. NASA often uses the phrase Environmental Control and Life-Support System or the acronym ECLSS when describing these systems for its human spaceflight missions. The life-support system may supply: air, water and food. It must also maintain the correct body temperature, an acceptable pressure on the body and deal with the body's waste products. Shielding against harmful external influences such as radiation and micro-meteorites may also be necessary. Components of the life-support system are life-critical, and are designed and constructed using safety engineering techniques.

=== Space weather ===
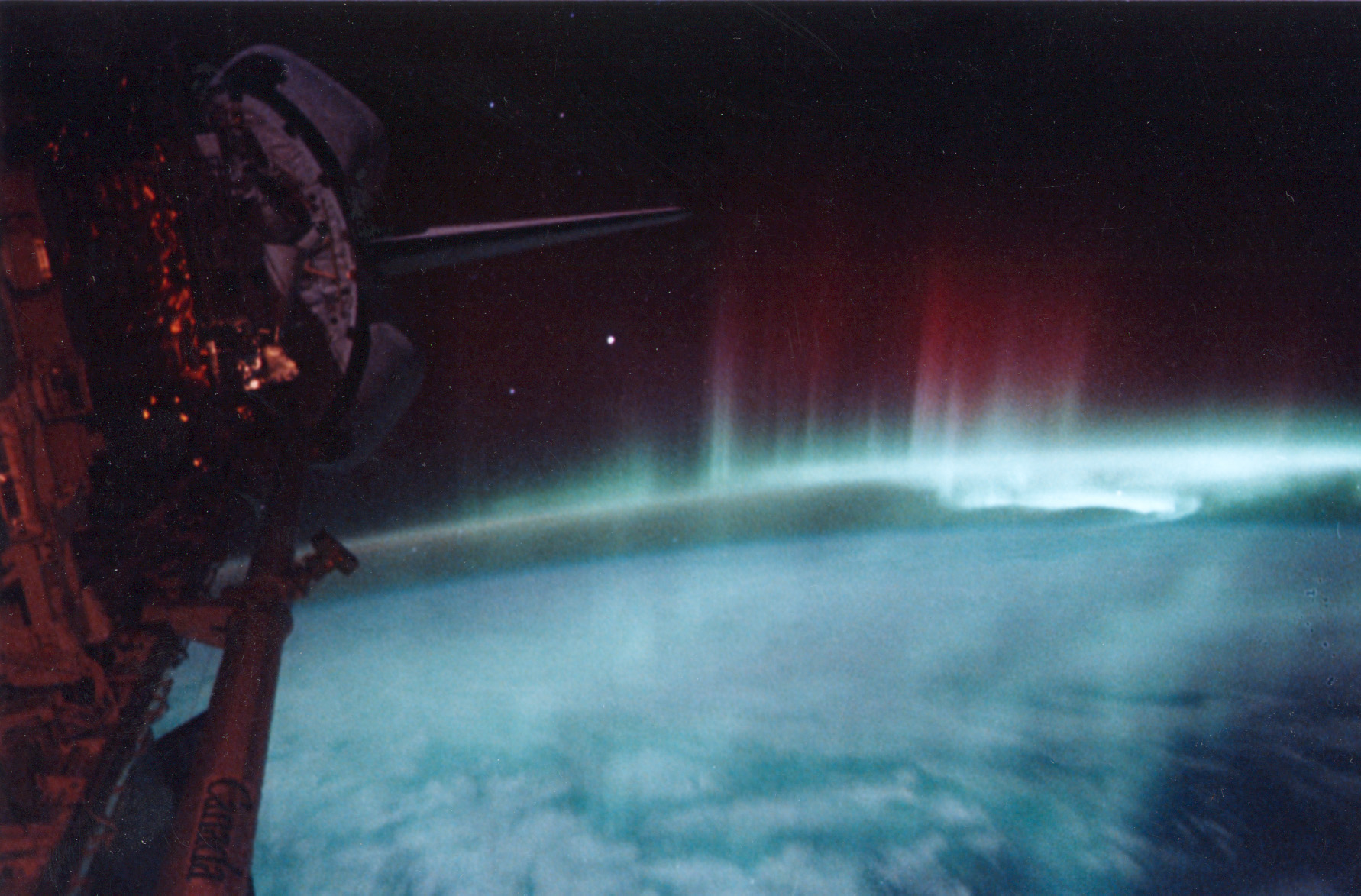
Aurora australis and Discovery, May 1991

Space weather is the concept of changing environmental conditions in outer space. It is distinct from the concept of weather within a planetary atmosphere, and deals with phenomena involving ambient plasma, magnetic fields, radiation and other matter in space (generally close to Earth but also in interplanetary, and occasionally interstellar medium). "Space weather describes the conditions in space that affect Earth and its technological systems. Our space weather is a consequence of the behavior of the Sun, the nature of Earth's magnetic field, and our location in the Solar System."

Space weather exerts a profound influence in several areas related to space exploration and development. Changing geomagnetic conditions can induce changes in atmospheric density causing the rapid degradation of spacecraft altitude in Low Earth orbit. Geomagnetic storms due to increased solar activity can potentially blind sensors onboard spacecraft, or interfere with on-board electronics. An understanding of space environmental conditions is also important in designing shielding and life-support systems for crewed spacecraft.

=== Environmental considerations ===
Exhaust pollution of rockets depends on the produced exhausts by the propellants reactions and the location of exhaustion. They mostly exhaust greenhouse gases and sometimes toxic components. Particularly at higher levels of the atmosphere the potency of exhausted gases as greenhouse gases increases considerably. Many solid rockets have chlorine in the form of perchlorate or other chemicals, and this can cause temporary local holes in the ozone layer. Re-entering spacecraft generate nitrates which also can temporarily impact the ozone layer. Most rockets are made of metals that can have an environmental impact during their construction. While spaceflight altogether pollutes at a fraction of other human activities, it still does pollute heavily if calculated per passenger.

In addition to the atmospheric effects there are effects on the near-Earth space environment. There is the possibility that orbit could become inaccessible for generations due to exponentially increasing space debris caused by spalling of satellites and vehicles (Kessler syndrome). Many launched vehicles today are therefore designed to be re-entered after use.

=== Regulation ===
A wide range of issues such as space traffic management or liability have been issues of spaceflight regulation.

Participation and representation of all humanity in spaceflight is an issue of international space law ever since the first phase of space exploration. Even though some rights of non-spacefaring countries have been secured, sharing of space for all humanity is still criticized as imperialist and lacking, understanding spaceflight as a resource.

=== Access ===
Inclusion has been a national and international issue, resulting in 1967 in the Outer Space Treaty and its claim of outer space as the "province of all mankind". Furthermore social inclusion in human spaceflight has been demanded, with women to fly to space being limited, and minorities, like people with disability, only having been selected in European Space Agency's 2022 astronaut group.

The dominating issue about access in most recent years has been the issue of space debris and space sustainability, since established spacefaring countries endanger access to outer space with their orbital space polluting activity.

== Applications ==
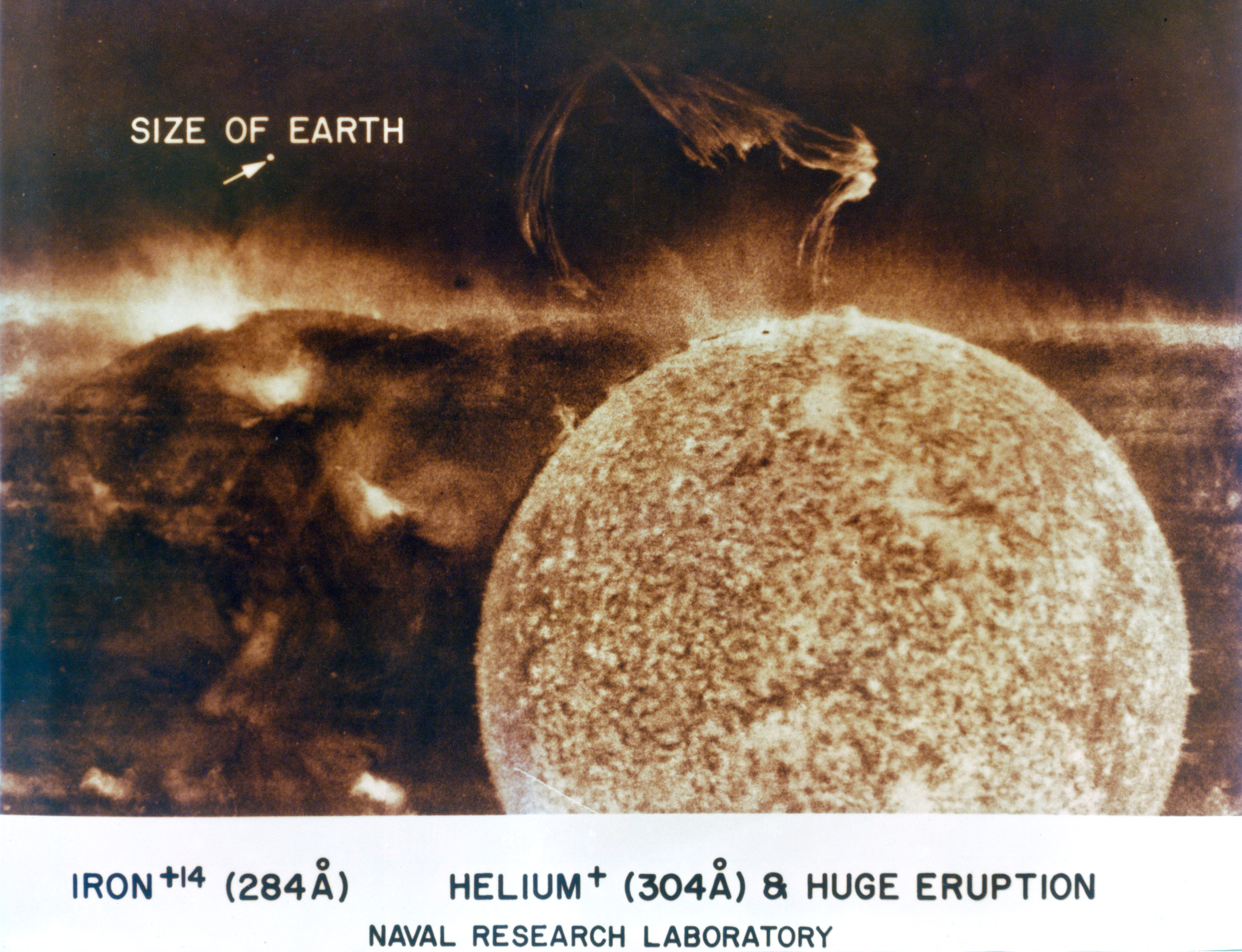
This shows an extreme ultraviolet view of the Sun (the Apollo Telescope Mount SO82A Experiment) taken during Skylab 3, with the Earth added for scale. On the right an image of the Sun shows a helium emissions, and there is an image on the left showing emissions from iron. One application for spaceflight is to take observation hindered or made more difficult by being on Earth's surface. Skylab included a massive crewed solar observatory that revolutionized solar science in the early 1970s using the Apollo-based space station in conjunction with crewed spaceflights to it.

Current and proposed applications for spaceflight include:

- Earth observation satellites such as spy satellites, weather satellites
- Space exploration
- Communication satellites
- Satellite television
- Satellite navigation
- Space telescopes
- Space tourism
- Protecting Earth from potentially hazardous objects
- Space colonization

Most early spaceflight development was paid for by governments. However, today major launch markets such as communication satellites and satellite television are purely commercial, though many of the launchers were originally funded by governments.

Private spaceflight is a rapidly developing area: space flight that is not only paid for by corporations or even private individuals, but often provided by private spaceflight companies. These companies often assert that much of the previous high cost of access to space was caused by governmental inefficiencies they can avoid. This assertion can be supported by much lower published launch costs for private space launch vehicles such as Falcon 9 developed with private financing. Lower launch costs and excellent safety will be required for the applications such as space tourism and especially space colonization to become feasible for expansion.

== Spacefaring ==
Map showing countries with spaceflight capability Countries with independently developed human spaceflight programs Countries that have operated at least one human spaceflight program, if not independently Countries seeking to develop a human spaceflight program but also have developed or currently own a launch vehicle Countries who operate a launch vehicle and a satellite but currently have no plans to develop a crewed space vehicle Countries seeking to develop a launch vehicle Countries who operate an orbiting satellite but do not own a launch vehicle or have plans to produce one Countries who have a launch vehicle but do not currently operate a satellite

To be spacefaring is to be capable of and active in the operation of spacecraft. It involves a knowledge of a variety of topics and development of specialised skills including: aeronautics; astronautics; programs to train astronauts; space weather and forecasting; spacecraft operations; operation of various equipment; spacecraft design and construction; atmospheric takeoff and reentry; orbital mechanics (a.k.a. astrodynamics); communications; engines and rockets; execution of evolutions such as towing, microgravity construction, and space docking; cargo handling equipment, dangerous cargos and cargo storage; spacewalking; dealing with emergencies; survival at space and first aid; fire fighting; life support. The degree of knowledge needed within these areas is dependent upon the nature of the work and the type of vessel employed. "Spacefaring" is analogous to seafaring.

There has never been a crewed mission outside the Earth–Moon system. However, the United States, Russia, China, European Space Agency (ESA) countries, and a few corporations and enterprises have plans in various stages to travel to Mars (see Human mission to Mars).

Spacefaring entities can be sovereign states, supranational entities, and private corporations. Spacefaring nations are those capable of independently building and launching craft into space. A growing number of private entities have become or are becoming spacefaring.

=== Global coordination ===
The United Nations Office for Outer Space Affairs (UNOOSA) has been the main multilateral body servicing international contact and exchange on space activity among spacefaring and non-spacefaring states.

=== Crewed spacefaring nations ===
Currently Russia, the United States and China are the only crewed spacefaring nations. Spacefaring nations listed by date of first crewed launch:

1. Soviet Union (Russia) (1961)
2. United States (1961)
3. China (2003)

=== Uncrewed spacefaring nations ===
The following nations or organizations have developed their own launch vehicles to launch uncrewed spacecraft into orbit either from their own territory or with foreign assistance (date of first launch in parentheses):

1. Soviet Union (1957)
2. United States (1958)
3. France (1965)
4. Italy (1967)★
5. Australia (1967)★
6. Japan (1970)
7. China (1970)
8. United Kingdom (1971)
9. European Space Agency (1979)
10. India (1980)
11. Israel (1988)
12. Ukraine (1991)*
13. Russia (1992)*
14. Iran (2009)
15. North Korea (2012)
16. South Korea (2013)
17. New Zealand (2018)★
- *Previously part of the Soviet Union
- ★Launch vehicle fully or partially developed by another country

Also several countries, such as Canada, Italy, and Australia, had semi-independent spacefaring capability, launching locally built satellites on foreign launchers. Canada had designed and built satellites (Alouette 1 and 2) in 1962 and 1965 which were orbited using U.S. launch vehicles. Italy has designed and built several satellites, as well as pressurized modules for the International Space Station. Early Italian satellites were launched using vehicles provided by NASA, first from Wallops Flight Facility in 1964 and then from a spaceport in Kenya (San Marco Platform) between 1967 and 1988; Italy has led the development of the Vega rocket programme within the European Space Agency since 1998. The United Kingdom abandoned its independent space launch program in 1972 in favour of co-operating with the European Launcher Development Organisation (ELDO) on launch technologies until 1974. Australia abandoned its launcher program shortly after the successful launch of WRESAT, and became the only non-European member of ELDO.

=== Suborbital ===
Considering merely launching an object beyond the Kármán line to be the minimum requirement of spacefaring, Germany, with the V-2 rocket, became the first spacefaring nation in 1944. The following nations have only achieved suborbital spaceflight capability by launching indigenous rockets or missiles or both into suborbital space:

1. Nazi Germany (June 20, 1944)
2. East Germany (April 12, 1957)
3. Canada (September 5, 1959)
4. Lebanon (November 21, 1962)
5. Switzerland (October 27, 1967)
6. Argentina (April 16, 1969)
7. Brazil (September 21, 1976)
8. Spain (February 18, 1981)
9. West Germany (March 1, 1981)
10. Iraq (June 1984)
11. South Africa (June 1, 1989)
12. Sweden (May 8, 1991)
13. Yemen (May 12, 1994)
14. Pakistan (April 6, 1998)
15. Taiwan (December 15, 1998)
16. Syria (September 1, 2000)
17. Indonesia (September 29, 2004)
18. Democratic Republic of the Congo (2007)
19. New Zealand (November 30, 2009)
20. Norway (September 27, 2018)
21. Netherlands (September 19, 2020)
22. Turkey (October 29, 2020)

== See also ==
- Aerial landscape art – Landscape considered as art
- List of crewed spacecraft
- List of Solar System probes
- List of spaceflight records – Extreme benchmarks set off Earth by astronauts, launchers and probes
- List of uncrewed spacecraft by program – Overview of and topical guide to space exploration
- Orbiter (simulator) – 2000 video game
- Animals in space
- Plants in space – Growth of plants in outer space
- Private spaceflight – Spaceflight not by a government
- Space and survival – Idea that spacefaring is necessary for long-term human survival
- Space advocacy – Advocacy for exploration and/or colonization of space
- Space colonization – Concept of permanent human habitation outside of Earth
- Human outpost – Human habitats located in environments inhospitable for humans
- Space logistics – Logistics for space travel
- Space travel in science fiction
- Spacecraft propulsion – Method used to accelerate spacecraft
- Timeline of artificial satellites and space probes
- Timeline of Solar System exploration
- Soviet space exploration history on Soviet stamps – Space exploration on Soviet stamps
- U.S. space exploration history on U.S. stamps – Overview of ventures beyond Earth as depicted for ease of American postage
- Kardashev scale – Measure of a civilization's evolution
