= Space technology =

Technology developed for use in Space exploration

Space technology is technology for use in outer space. Space technology includes space vehicles such as spacecraft, satellites, space stations and orbital launch vehicles; deep-space communication; in-space propulsion; and a wide variety of other technologies including support infrastructure equipment, and procedures.

Many common everyday services for terrestrial use such as weather forecasting, remote sensing, satellite navigation systems, satellite television, and some long-distance communications systems critically rely on space infrastructure. Of the sciences, astronomy and Earth science benefit from space technology. New technologies originating with or accelerated by space-related endeavours are often subsequently exploited in other economic activities.

== History of space technology ==
The first known spaceflight occurred on 20 June 1944, when a V-2 rocket was launched vertically from the Peenemünde Army Research Center, attaining an apogee of 176 km, well above the later defined Kármán line which legally defined the boundary of space. It was the first suborbital spaceflight.

The first country on Earth to put any technology into orbit was the Soviet Union. The Soviet Union sent the Sputnik 1 satellite on October 4, 1957. It weighed about 83 kg (183 lb). Analysis of the radio signals gathered information about the electron density of the ionosphere, while temperature and pressure data were encoded in the duration of radio beeps.

The first successful human spaceflight was Vostok 1, carrying 27-year-old Soviet cosmonaut Yuri Gagarin in April 1961. The entire mission was controlled by either automatic systems or by ground control. This was because medical staff and spacecraft engineers were unsure how a human might react to weightlessness, so they decided to lock the pilot's manual controls.

The first probe to impact the Moon's surface was the Soviet probe Luna 2, which made a hard landing on September 14, 1959. The far side of the Moon was first photographed on October 7, 1959, by the Soviet probe Luna 3. On December 24, 1968, the crew of Apollo 8, Frank Borman, James Lovell and William Anders, became the first human beings to enter lunar orbit and see the far side of the Moon in person. Humans first landed on the Moon on July 20, 1969. The first human to walk on the lunar surface was Neil Armstrong, commander of Apollo 11. India was the first country to land on the Moon's South Pole.Chandrayaan-3 was launched aboard an LVM3-M4 rocket on 14 July 2023, at 09:05 UTC from Satish Dhawan Space Centre Second Launch Pad in Sriharikota, Andhra Pradesh, India, entering an Earth parking orbit with a perigee of 170 km (106 mi) and an apogee of 36,500 km (22,680 mi).

Apollo 11 was followed by Apollo 12, 14, 15, 16, and 17. Apollo 13 had a failure of the Apollo service module, but passed the far side of the Moon at an altitude of 254 kilometers (158 miles; 137 nautical miles) above the lunar surface, and 400,171 km (248,655 mi) from Earth, marking the record for the farthest humans travelled from Earth in 1970.

The first robotic lunar rover to land on the Moon was the Soviet vessel Lunokhod 1 on November 17, 1970, as part of the Lunokhod program. To date, the last human to stand on the Moon was Eugene Cernan, who, as part of the Apollo 17 mission, walked on the Moon in December 1972. Apollo 17 was followed by several uncrewed interplanetary missions operated by NASA. Also, technological innovations in space exploration have important effects on the economy, society, and the environment.

Economically, new safety features and technology have made space missions cheaper. Reusable rockets help companies save money because they do not need to fix or replace rockets as often. This makes space exploration more affordable and encourages more investment in the space industry.

Socially, these new technologies have created many jobs in areas like engineering, research, and aerospace manufacturing. The growth of the space industry also helps other industries, such as telecommunications and materials engineering, by creating new job opportunities.

Environmentally, using reusable rockets helps reduce space debris. By reusing rockets, space agencies can produce less waste and lessen the impact of space missions on the environment. This approach supports cleaner space exploration and a more sustainable future.

In summary, technological advances in space exploration positively affect the economy, create jobs, and promote environmental sustainability, helping the field continue to grow.

One notable interplanetary mission is Voyager 1, the first artificial object to leave the Solar System into interstellar space on August 25, 2012. It is also the most distant artificial object from Earth. The probe passed the heliopause at 121 AU to enter interstellar space. Voyager 1 is currently at a distance of 145.11 astronomical units (2.1708×10^{10} km; 1.3489×10^{10} mi) (21.708 billion kilometers; 13.489 billion miles) from Earth as of January 1, 2019.

== Hazards caused by space technology ==
All launch vehicles contain a huge amount of energy that is needed for some part of it to reach orbit. There is therefore some risk that this energy can be released prematurely and suddenly, with significant effects. When a Delta II rocket exploded 13 seconds after launch on January 17, 1997, there were reports of store windows 10 miles (16 km) away being broken by the blast.

Space is a fairly predictable environment, but there are still risks of accidental depressurization and the potential failure of equipment, some of which may be very newly developed.

In April 2004 the International Association for the Advancement of Space Safety was established in the Netherlands to further international cooperation and scientific advancement in space systems safety.

== See also ==
- NewSpace
- Spacecraft propulsion
- Space science
