= Colorado Center for Astrodynamics Research =

Research center at the University of Colorado

The Colorado Center for Astrodynamics Research (CCAR) is an American aerospace research center specializing in orbital mechanics and spacecraft navigation, located at the University of Colorado at Boulder. CCAR was established at the University of Colorado at Boulder in the College of Engineering and Applied science during the fall of 1985 as a part of the University of Colorado's commitment to develop a program of excellence in space science and is hosted by the Department of Aerospace Engineering Sciences. CCAR is a multidisciplinary group involving faculty, staff and students from the Department of Aerospace Engineering Sciences. Its research program emphasizes astrodynamics, satellite meteorology, oceanography, geodesy, and terrestrial vegetation studies.

CCAR was founded by professor George Born who served as Director for 28 years and Director Emeritus until his death in 2016. Born joined University of Colorado at Boulder after working on high-profile missions like TOPEX/Poseidon, Seasat, Mariner 9 and the Viking program at the Jet Propulsion Laboratory during the 1970s.
