= Alex Fielding =

American engineer and manager

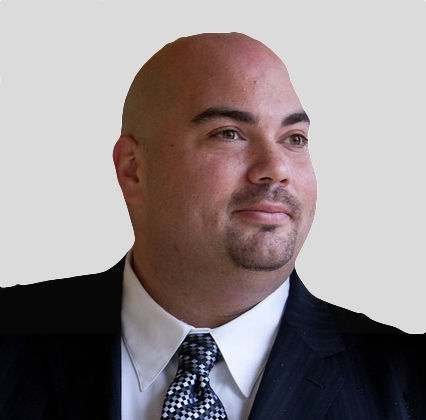
- Born: 1978 (age 47–48); Santa Clara, California, U.S.
- Occupations: Chief executive officer Chief technology officer Computer scientist Electrical engineer
- Children: 1
- Website: www.privateer.com

Alex Fielding (born 1978) is an American engineer and manager. He is the CEO and co-founder of Privateer Space, a space startup with a global online marketplace that aims to connect customers seeking planetary data with orbiting satellites and AI. He co-founded the company with Apple co-founder Steve Wozniak and MacArthur Genius Moriba Jah. Privateer announced in 2023 that it had grown the business from the Google Maps of space to become the first AI powered space data ride sharing platform with an upcoming satellite autopilot system called Pono set to fly on SpaceX in December 2023. The International Space Station National Labs, in partnership with Privateer announced a deal whereby Privateer publicly tracks and displays mission data on International Space Station telemetry, astronauts, and mission objectives live on the ISS National Labs website. He was co-founder and CEO of robotics company Ripcord, Inc from 2014 to 2021.

== Biography ==
Alex Fielding started his career as an engineer at Cisco Systems and Apple Computer. Shortly after departing Apple, he worked at Exodus Communications for Ellen Hancock. Exodus' CEO who was Apple's former CTO. He co-founded Wheels of Zeus with Apple's co-founder Steve Wozniak in 2001. It was sold to Zontrak in 2006.

Fielding became CEO of encryption products company Ripcord Networks in 2004 with former Apple CEO Gil Amelio, CTO, Hancock, and Wozniak on its board. The company existed through about 2009 when its assets were purchased in an undisclosed transaction. He was then chief technology officer at Power Assure from 2009 to 2013, and then vice president at Vigilent until 2014.

Started working with NASA in 2010 with CTO Chris C. Kemp and started what might be another company of the same name, Ripcord, Inc while in a partnership at the agency in 2014. Fielding later was named an advisor to space startup Astra where Kemp is CEO.

Ripcord announced $180 million in funding in March 2017 from Kleiner Perkins Caufield & Byers, Lux Capital, Legend Star (part of China-based Legend Holdings), and Steve Wozniak. Ripcord is utilizing vision guided robotics, industrial automation, and advanced sensors to digitize paper records. Once digitized, Ripcord provides a software as a service records service called Ripcord Canopy. Further funding was announced later in 2017 and in 2020, including investor CDK Global. In September, 2020, Ripcord announced a joint venture with Fuji Xerox. In August 2021, he was replaced at Ripcord by William Kurtz, former chief financial officer while the company prepared for a public offering.

Fielding joined the board of directors of the Institute for the Study of Knowledge Management in Education in 2017. He was on the boards of the CodeWarrior Foundation, and California Women Empowering Women, a 501c3 non-profit. He is an advisor to TEDMED and TED WED. He is a donor to UNICEF. Fielding is a former member of Mensa International and Silicon Valley Association of Startup Entrepreneurs. He is a contributing member of two NIST working groups on the Security Content Automation Protocol (SCAP).

== Patents ==
Fielding is listed as an inventor on the following robotics, machine learning, and artificial intelligence patents:

- US Patent No. 11,048,732: "Systems and methods for tagging based on a specific area or region".
- US Patent No. 11,030,199: "Systems and Methods for contextual retrieval and display of search results"
- US Patent No. 10,778,858: "Systems and methods relating to document and fastener identification"
- US Patent No. 10,142,167: "Computer Vision based document and fastener identification"
- US Patent No. 10,387,456: "Region based machine learning for records tagging"
- US Patent No. 10,198,479: "Utilizing machine learning and NLP for contextual retrieval and display"

== Sources ==
- iWoz: From Computer Geek to Culture Icon: How I Invented the Personal Computer, Co-Founded Apple, and Had Fun Doing It - Listed In Thank Yous
- Mitnick, Kevin; Simon, William L. (October 2003). The Art of Deception: Controlling the Human Element of Security. Wiley Books. ISBN 978-0-7645-4280-0. Listed In Thank Yous
- Mitnick, Kevin; Simon, William L. (December 27, 2005). The Art of Intrusion: The Real Stories Behind the Exploits of Hackers, Intruders & Deceivers. Wiley Books. ISBN 978-0-7645-6959-3. Listed in Thank Yous.
- Simon, William L. (April 14, 2006). iCon Steve Jobs: The Greatest Second Act in the History of Business. Wiley Books. ISBN 0471787841 - Quoted in emails from Steve Jobs.
- Lopez, Thomas Michael (May 28, 2018). "If I Were Rich, I Would Travel Everywhere With A Mariachi Band": A Savage Voyage Through Silicon Valley And The Information Age -The Anonymityville Horror-. LockKnox Publications / Amazon Books ISBN 978-1718067271. Supporting Character, known as Field of Dreams.
- His Parents' Good Deed Shaped How One Founder Runs His Company - Diversity and Inclusion
