= International Association for the Advancement of Space Safety =

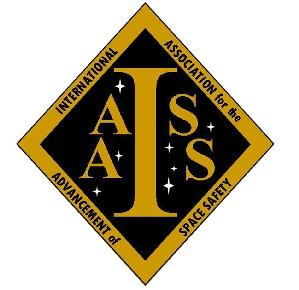
- Type: Non-profit organization
- Industry: Space
- Founded: Noordwijk, Netherlands (April 2004)
- Headquarters: Noordwijk, Netherlands,
- Members: 200 members from 25 countries
- Website: www.iaass.org

The International Association for the Advancement of Space Safety (IAASS) is a non-profit organization committed to furthering international cooperation and scientific advancement in space systems safety. Its aim is to advance the science and application of space safety. IAASS was legally established on April 16, 2004 in the Netherlands. It became a member of the International Astronautical Federation (IAF) in October 2004. The IAASS is based on the intellectual interaction of individual members who together shape the technical vision of the association, and make the association services available to stakeholders (on a non-profit basis).

In June 2006, former US Senator John Glenn and first American to orbit became an Honorary Member. In June 2010, IAASS was granted the Observer status at the United Nations COPUOS (Committee on the Peaceful Uses of Outer Space).

The association counts more than 200 professional members from 25 countries, 55% of the members are from industry, while the remaining 45% come from space agencies, governmental institutions and academia.

A 2005 report by the Space and Advanced Communications Research Institute (SACRI) of George Washington University, titled Space Safety Report: Vulnerabilities and Risk Reduction In U.S. Human Space Flight Programs suggested that the newly formed IAASS might help improve the safety of the International Space Station (ISS). It also recommended NASA work with the IAASS to develop safety standards and advancement of space debris minimization and control.

The first IAASS conference was held in Nice, France in October 2005. The European Space Agency sponsored the second IAASS Conference "Space Safety in a Global World" in May 2007 in Chicago. The third conference was held 21–23 October 2008 in Rome, Italy. The fourth conference was held 19–21 May in Huntsville, USA. The fifth conference was held 17–19 October 2011 in Versailles, France, and the 6th conference 21–23 May 2013 in Montreal, Canada.

== Space Safety ==
Space safety is defined as freedom from man-made or natural harmful conditions. Harmful conditions are defined as those conditions that can cause death, injury, illness, damage to or loss of systems, facilities, equipment or property, or damage to the environment.

This definition of space safety includes human on board, personnel directly involved in system integration and operation, personnel not directly involved but co-located, as well as general public. For unmanned systems such as robotic satellites, damages due to non-malicious external causes that translates into degradation or loss of mission objectives is also included in the definition of safety. For example, unwanted collision of a satellite with another satellite, or with a space debris. Fig.1 shows the various fields of space safety, their national, international or global scope of interest, and the principal means for achieving safety (by design, or operations), although a mixture would be generally used.

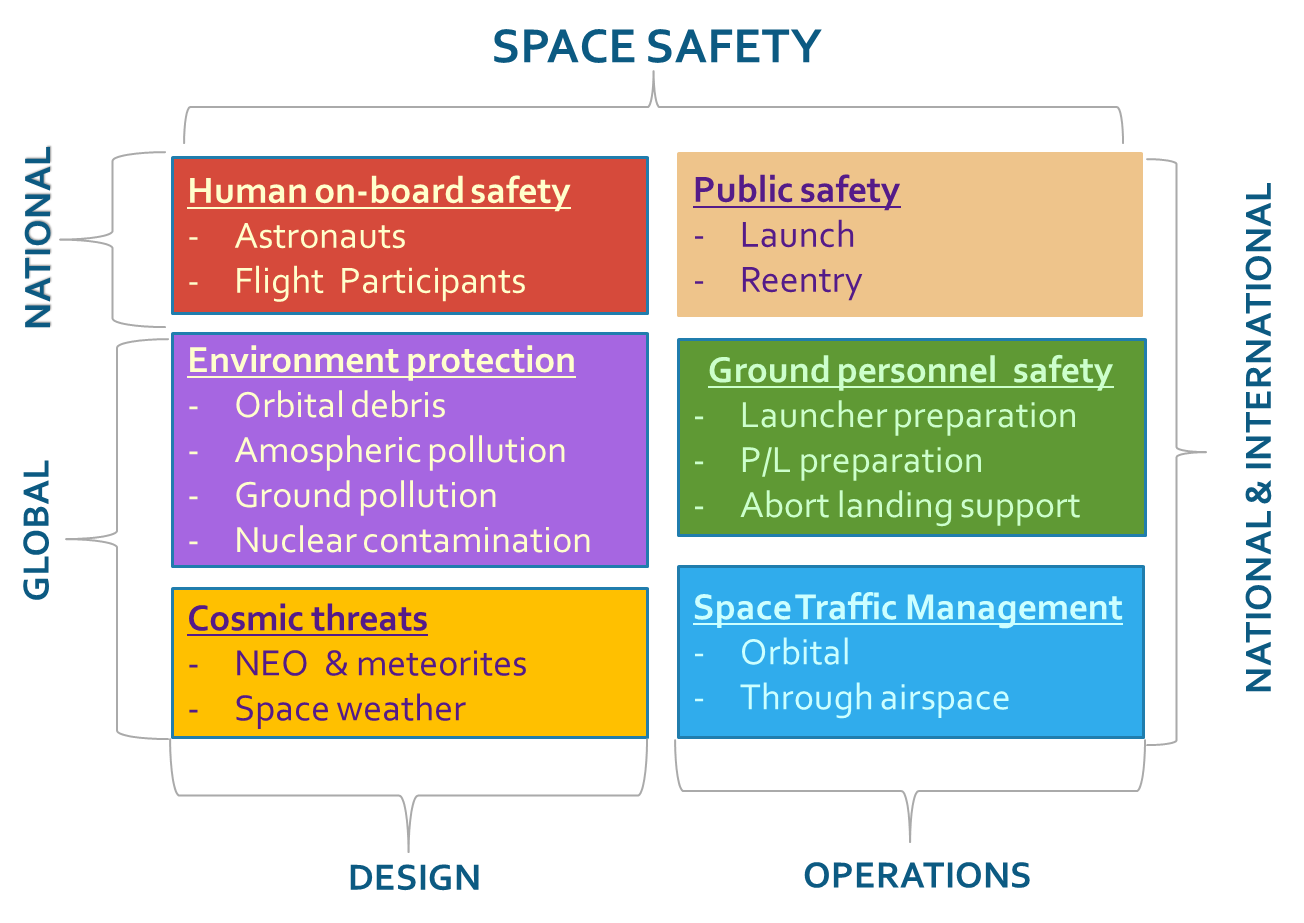
What Space Safety involves

Although safety refers to threats that are non-voluntary in nature (design errors, malfunctions, human errors, etc.), security refers to threats which are voluntary (i.e. of aggressive nature such as use of anti-satellite weapons). In some languages a single term is used for both, which may sometimes be confusing.

Absolute freedom from harmful conditions is impossible to achieve. To be absolutely safe a system, product, device, material or environment should never cause or have the potential to cause an accident. In the realization and operation of systems the term safety is generally used to mean acceptable risk level, not absolute safety.

Acceptable risk level is not the same as personal acceptance of risk, but it refers to risk acceptability by stakeholders’ community or by society in a broad sense. Acceptable risk levels vary from system to system, and evolve with time due to socio-economic changes and technological advancement. Implementing proven best-practices at status-of-art is a prerequisite for achieving an acceptable risk level, or in other words to make a system safe. Best-practices are traditionally established by government regulations and norms, and/or by industrial standards. Without such reference the term safety, or acceptable risk, becomes meaningless. In other words, compliance with regulations, norms and standards represents the safety yardstick of a system.

== Journal of Space Safety Engineering ==
The Journal of Space Safety Engineering (JSSE) is a quarterly publication of the International Association for the Advancement of Space Safety (IAASS). JSSE serves applied scientists, engineers, policy makers and safety advocates with a platform to develop, promote and coordinate the science, technology and practice of space safety.

== Space Safety Magazine ==
The Space Safety Magazine (SSM) is a quarterly print magazine and a daily news website, jointly published by the International Association for Advancement of Space Safety (IAASS) and the International Space Safety Foundation (ISSF). Space Safety Magazine is focused on safety related issues affecting space as well as safety on Earth from space events and objects.

== See also ==
- Safety engineering
