= Military branch =

Subdivision of the national armed forces

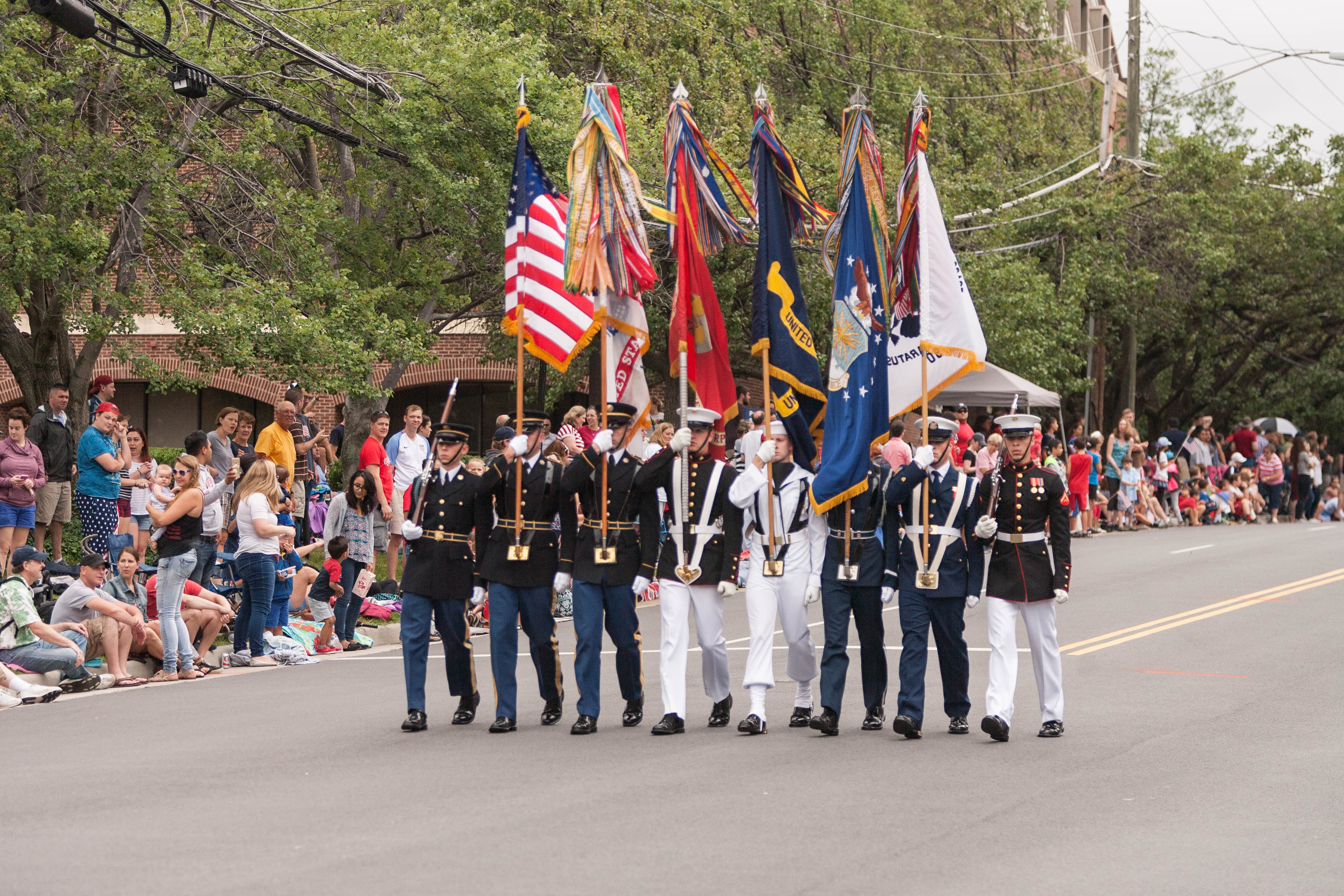
A United States Armed Forces Joint-Service Color Guard. This color guard consists of personnel from 5 of the 6 military branches of the United States Armed Forces (Army, Marines, Air Force, Navy, and Coast Guard).

A military branch (also service branch or armed service) is a first level subdivision of the national armed forces of a state.

== Types of branches ==
Type	Role	Example (if atypical)
Air and space force	Air and space warfare	French Air and Space Force
Airborne forces	Paratrooper operations	Russian Airborne Forces
Air defense force	Air and missile defense	Egyptian Air Defense Forces
Air force	Aerial warfare	
Army	Ground warfare	
Border guard	Border security	Vietnam Border Guard
Coast guard	Maritime security	United States Coast Guard
Command and control	Reconnaissance, Communication, Surveillance, Information warfare	People's Liberation Army Information Support Force
Cyber force	Cyberwarfare	Digital and Intelligence Service (Singapore)
Emergencies service	Disaster relief and emergency management	Military Emergencies Unit (Spain)
Engineering service	Military engineering	Construction and Engineering Forces (Mongolia)
Gendarmerie	Military and/or public policing	National Gendarmerie (France)
General Staff	Command and control	Strategic Command Operations (Venezuela)
Logistics service	Military logistics	Joint Support Service (Germany)
Marines	Naval land force	United States Marine Corps
Medical service	Medical service	Belgian Medical Service
Military police	Military law enforcement agency	Republic of China Military Police
Military reserve force	National reserve and auxiliary service	Lithuanian National Defence Volunteer Forces
Navy	Naval warfare	
Strategic rocket force	Operation of land-based strategic missiles	People's Liberation Army Rocket Force (China)
Royal/Presidential guard	Protection of royal families / presidential offices and ceremonial duties	Saudi Royal Guard Regiment / Republican Guard (Algeria)
Space force	Space warfare	United States Space Force
Special forces	Special operations	Polish Special Forces
Unmanned systems forces	Drone warfare	Unmanned Systems Forces (Ukraine)

=== Unified armed forces ===
The Canadian Armed Forces is the unified armed forces of Canada. While it has three distinct commands – namely the Canadian Army, Royal Canadian Navy, and Royal Canadian Air Force – it remains a single military service.

=== NATO definition ===
Branch of service (also branch of military service or branch of armed service) refers, according to NATO standards, to a branch, employment of combined forces or parts of a service, below the level of service, military service, or armed service.

== See also ==
- List of militaries by country
- Military organization
