= Space weapon =

Weapons used in space warfare

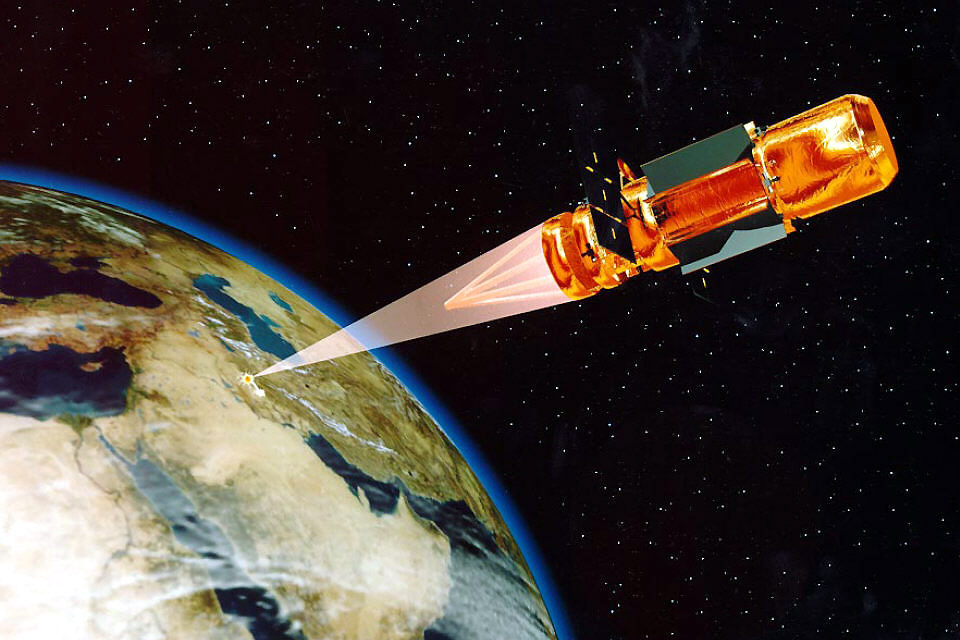
A United States Space Command impression of a conceptual satellite-based directed-energy weapon used to precisely strike targets on Earth

Space weapons are weapons used in space warfare. They include weapons that can attack space systems in orbit (for example, anti-satellite weapons), attack targets on the earth from space or disable missiles travelling through space. In the course of the militarisation of space, such weapons were developed mainly by the contesting superpowers during the Cold War, and some have already been deployed in space. Space weapons are also a central theme in military science fiction and sci-fi video games.

== Disclosed space weapons ==
The Air Force Secretary, Troy Meink, disclosed at an Air & Space Forces Association conference on September 14, 2026 that the United States had already deployed via the U.S. Space Force active "on-orbit space control weapons capable of defending the joint force against hostile adversary action".

== Space-to-space weapons ==
The Soviet Almaz secret military space station program was equipped with a fixed 23mm autocannon to prevent hostile interception or boarding by hostile forces. This was the first and, as of 2022, the only space-to-space weapon to be fired in orbit.

The Soviet uncrewed Polyus weapons platform was designed to be equipped with a megawatt carbon-dioxide laser and a self-defense cannon. Similarly, the Soviet Cascade spacecraft (which was designed on the same platform as the Polyus) was planned to have an array of space-to-space missiles on the front.

The Russian Space Forces developed maneuverable satellites under the Nivelir program in the late 2010s, officially referred to as "inspector satellites", but suspected by U.S. private intelligence agency Slingshot Aerospace and Dutch astronomer Marco Langbroek to have an anti-satellite kinetic weapon onboard in one of them.

== Earth-to-space weapons ==
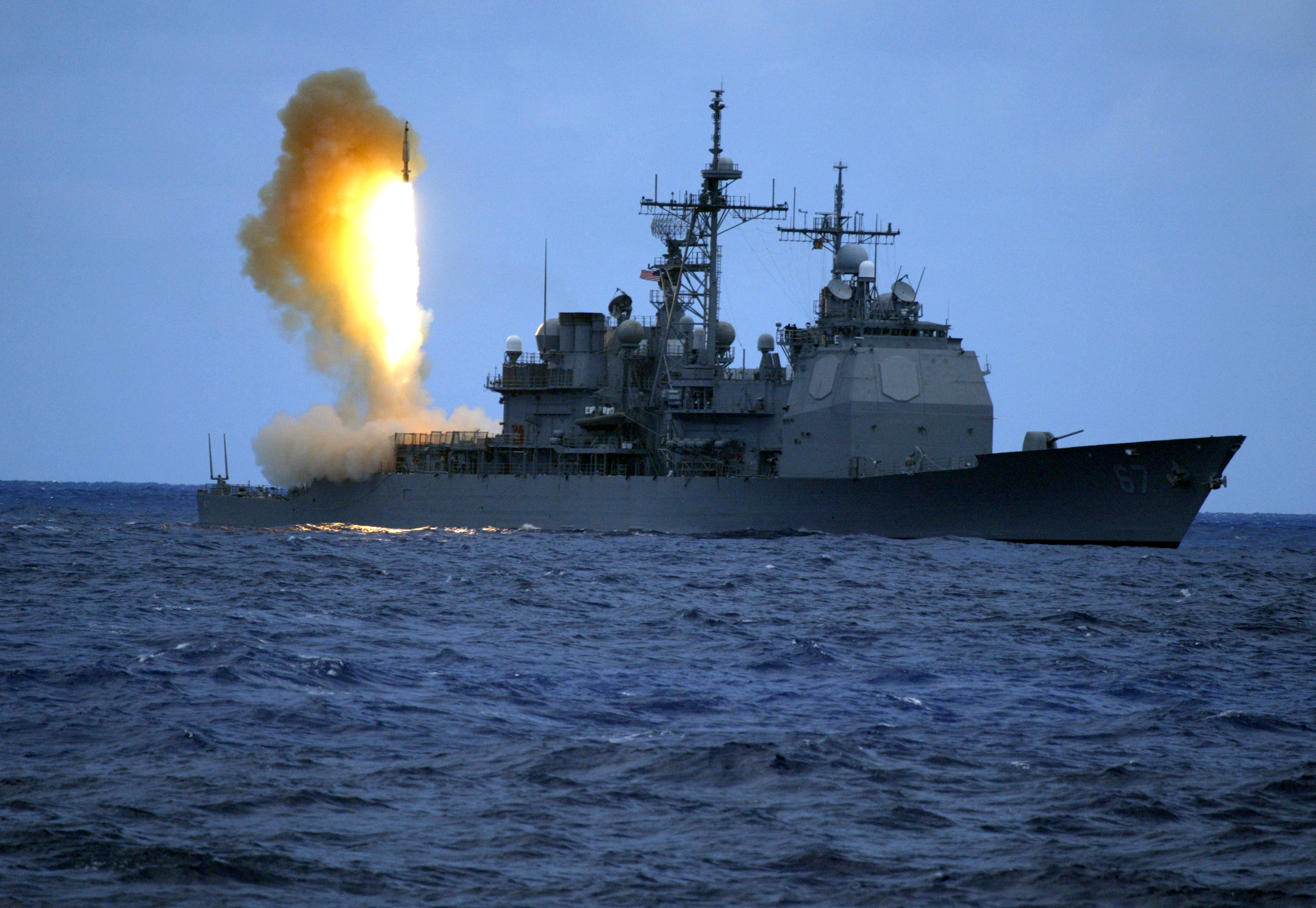
RIM-161 Standard Missile 3 anti-ballistic missile can engage targets in low Earth orbit.

Anti-satellite weapons, which are primarily surface-to-space and air-to-space missiles, have been developed by the United States, the USSR/Russia, India and the People's Republic of China. Multiple test firings have been done as part of recent Chinese and U.S test programs that involved destroying an orbiting satellite. In general, the use of explosive and kinetic kill systems is limited to relatively low altitudes due to space debris issues and so as to avoid leaving debris from launch in orbit. One exception was the 2007 destruction of a weather satellite by China, at an altitude of 865 km (537 mi), creating the largest debris field of any event in space.

=== Strategic Defense Initiative ===
On March 23, 1983, President Ronald Reagan proposed the Strategic Defense Initiative, a research program with a goal of developing a defensive system which would destroy enemy ICBMs. The defensive system was nicknamed Star Wars, after the movie, by its detractors. Some concepts of the system included Brilliant Pebbles, which were Kinetic Kill Vehicles, essentially small rockets launched from satellites toward their targets (a warhead, warhead bus, or even an upper stage of an ICBM). Other aspects included satellites in orbit carrying powerful laser weapons, plasma weapons, or particle beams. When a missile launch was detected, the satellite would fire at the missile (or warheads) and destroy it. Although no real hardware was ever manufactured for deployment, the military did test the use of lasers mounted on Boeing 747s to destroy missiles in the 2000s, however these were discontinued due to practical limitations of keeping a constant fleet airborne near potential launch sites due to the lasers range limitations keeping a small number from being sufficient. The tests took place at Edwards Air Force Base.

== Space-to-Earth weapons ==
=== Orbital weaponry ===
Orbital weaponry is any weapon that is in orbit around a large body such as a planet or moon. As of December 2022, there were no known operative orbital weapons systems, but several nations have deployed orbital surveillance networks to observe other nations or armed forces. Several orbital weaponry systems were designed by the United States and the Soviet Union during the Cold War. During World War II Nazi Germany was also developing plans for an orbital weapon called the Sun gun, an orbital mirror that would have been used to focus and weaponize beams of sunlight.

Development of orbital weaponry was largely halted after the entry into force of the Outer Space Treaty and the SALT II treaty. These agreements prohibit weapons of mass destruction from being placed in space. As other weapons exist, notably those using kinetic bombardment, that would not violate these treaties, some private groups and government officials have proposed a Space Preservation Treaty which would ban the placement of any weaponry in outer space.

The United States is seeking to develop Space-Based Interceptors for missile defense.

=== Orbital bombardment ===
Orbital bombardment is the act of attacking targets on a planet, moon or other astronomical object from orbit around the object, rather than from an aircraft, or a platform beyond orbit. It has been proposed as a means of attack for several weapons systems concepts, including kinetic bombardment and as a nuclear delivery system.

During the Cold War, the Soviet Union deployed a Fractional Orbital Bombardment System from 1968 to 1983. Using this system, a nuclear warhead could be placed in low Earth orbit, and later de-orbited to hit any location on the Earth's surface. While the Soviets deployed a working version of the system, they were forbidden by the Outer Space Treaty to place live warheads in space. The fractional orbital bombardment system was phased out in January 1983 in compliance with the SALT II treaty of 1979, which, among other things, prohibited the deployment of systems capable of placing weapons of mass destruction in such a partial orbit.

Orbital bombardment systems with conventional warheads are permitted under the terms of SALT II. Some of the proposed systems rely on large tungsten carbide/uranium cermet rods dropped from orbit and depend on kinetic energy, rather than explosives, but their mass makes them prohibitively difficult to transport to orbit.

As of 2020 the only true orbital bombardment in history has been executed for scientific purposes. On 5 April 2019 the Japanese Hayabusa2 robotic space probe released an explosive device called an "impactor" from space onto the surface of asteroid 162173 Ryugu, in order to collect debris released by the explosion. The mission was successful and Hayabusa2 retrieved valuable samples of the celestial body which it brought back to Earth.

== In fiction ==
Fictional or real space weapons in various forms are often prominently featured in science fiction, particularly in military science fiction and in video games with a sci-fi theme.

== See also ==
- Ivan's hammer
- Laser weapon
