= Luftwaffe (disambiguation) =

The Luftwaffe was the air force of Nazi Germany before and during World War II.

Luftwaffe, German for air force (lit. 'air weapon'), may also refer to:

- German Air Force, since 1956
- Swiss Air Force
- Luftwaffe (board wargame)

== See also ==
- Luftstreitkräfte (disambiguation)
- Air force (disambiguation)
