= Space warfare =

Combat that takes place in outer space

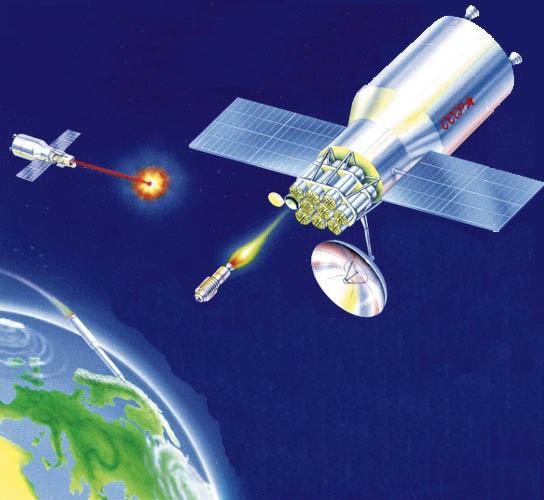
A United States Air Force illustration of a hypothetical Soviet Armed Forces space weapon

Space warfare is combat in which one or more belligerents are in outer space. The scope of space warfare includes ground-to-space warfare, such as attacking satellites from the Earth; space-to-space warfare, such as satellites attacking satellites; and space-to-ground warfare, such as satellites attacking Earth-based targets. The 1967 Outer Space Treaty forms the basis of space law; it prohibits permanent basing of weapons of mass destruction, such as nuclear weapons, in space and the military use of celestial bodies but does not prohibit the military use of Earth orbit or military space forces. Independent space forces are operated by the United States (US Space Force) and China (People's Liberation Army Aerospace Force). Russia operates significant space assets under the Russian Space Forces.

The Cold War prompted the start of the militarization of space. Military satellites have been launched since the late 1950s for communications, navigation, reconnaissance and munitions guidance. The Gulf War is sometimes called the "first space war" because of the use of these capabilities by the US. The use of Starlink satellites by Ukraine has played a major role in the Russian-Ukrainian War.

The US and Soviet Union carried out nine nuclear explosions in space from 1958 to 1962, which damaged satellites. Orbital space weapons were developed, especially for defence against nuclear missiles, but not widely deployed. The US Strategic Defense Initiative studied satellite-mounted advanced weaponry, drawing criticism as the "Star Wars program". The Soviet Union developed Istrebitel Sputnikov co-orbital weapons, Almaz military space stations, and the Polyus laser. Since 2025, the US has been developing the Golden Dome missile defense system, which includes orbital weapons. In September 2026 the US confirmed the deployment of "on-orbit space control weapons".

Ballistic missiles, which transit the upper atmosphere and sometimes outer space, have been used in combat since Germany's V-2 rocket during World War II. These were used on a large scale in the Iran–Iraq War, Gulf War, Red Sea crisis, and Iran–Israel war. In November 2023, Israel claimed an interception of a Houthi ballistic missile as the first combat in space.

Four nations have tested anti-satellite missiles by destroying a target satellite: the US' ASM-135 in 1985 and SM-3 in 2008, China's SC-19 in 2007, India's PDV Mark II in 2019, and Russia's A-235 in 2021. Israel's Arrow 3 missile may also have an anti-satellite capability.

== History ==
=== 1950s ===
During the early Cold War, a survivable reconnaissance asset was considered highly valuable. In a time before satellites, this meant building an aircraft that could fly higher or faster, or both, compared to any interceptor that would try to bring it down. Notably, the United States would introduce the U-2 spy plane in 1956. It was thought, at the time of its introduction, that the plane's service ceiling of 24,000 metres (80,000 ft) would render it immune to Soviet aircraft, missiles, and radar. That was the case until the 1960 U-2 incident, where a United States U-2 spy plane was shot down by the Soviet Air Defense Forces’ S-75 Dvina (SA-2 Guideline) surface-to-air missile while conducting photographic aerial reconnaissance deep inside Soviet territory.

Three years before the incident, in 1957, a modified R-7 rocket carried the world's first artificial satellite, Sputnik 1, into an orbit hundreds of kilometers above sea level, notably beyond the reach of any existing weapons system. While Sputnik 1 held no military value, only transmitting radio signals back to Earth for three weeks, its launch sparked the beginning of the Space Race. This spurred the United States to hasten and re-emphasize its space programs, culminating in the Explorer program, which launched the first American satellite into orbit in 1958. In tandem with the effort to achieve superior spaceflight capability over the other, the United States and the Soviet Union began to develop space warfare capabilities.

=== 1960s ===
Early efforts to conduct space warfare were directed at space-to-space warfare, as ground-to-space systems were considered to be too slow and too isolated by Earth's atmosphere and gravity to be effective at the time. The history of active space warfare development goes back to the 1960s when the Soviet Union began the Almaz project, a project designed to give them the ability to do on-orbit inspections of satellites and destroy them if needed. Similar planning in the United States took the form of the Blue Gemini project, which consisted of modified Gemini capsules that would be able to deploy weapons and perform surveillance.

One early test of electronic space warfare, the so-called Starfish Prime test, took place in 1962 when the United States exploded a ground-launched nuclear weapon in space to test the effects of an electromagnetic pulse. The result was a deactivation of many then-orbiting satellites, both American and Soviet. The deleterious and unfocused effects of the EMP test led to the banning of nuclear weapons in space in the Outer Space Treaty of 1967. (See high-altitude nuclear explosion.)

In the early 1960s, the U.S. military produced a film called Space and National Security which depicted space warfare.

The Soviet Union tested the Istrebitel Sputnikov co-orbital satellite weapons from 1968 to 1982.

=== 1970s–1990s ===
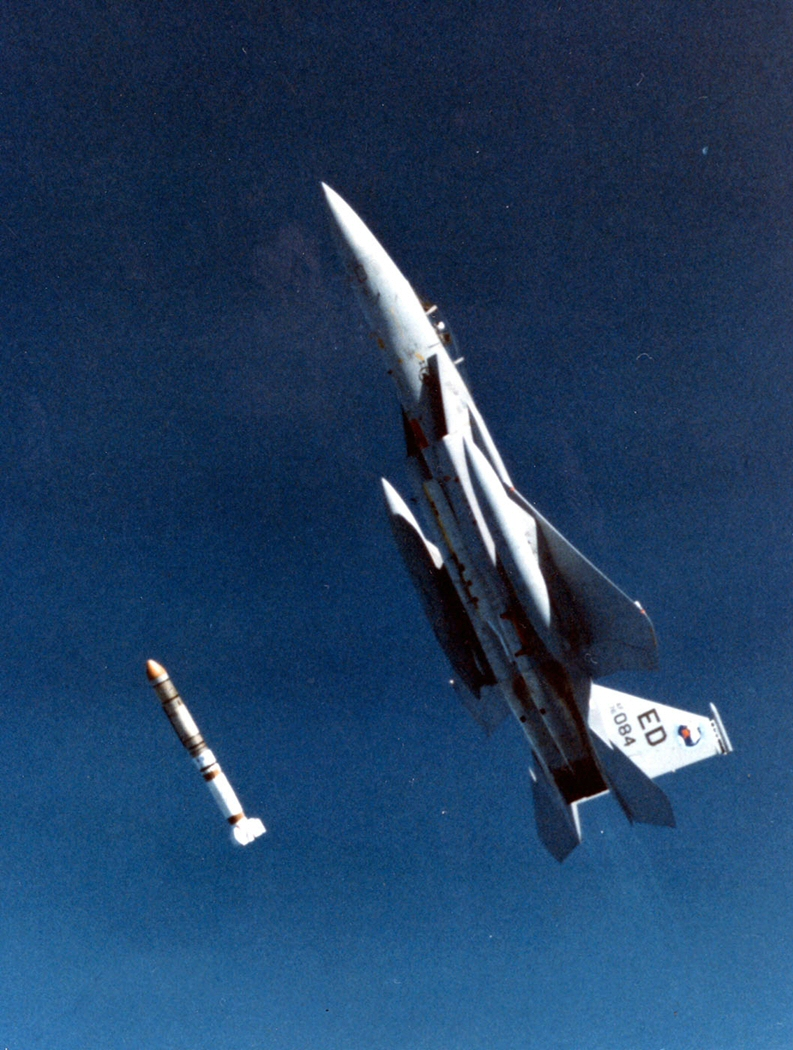
A USAF F-15 Eagle launching an ASM-135 ASAT (anti-satellite) missile in 1985

Through the 1970s, the Soviet Union continued their project and test-fired a cannon to test space station defense. This was considered too dangerous to do with a crew on board, however, so the test was conducted after the crew had returned to Earth.

A 1976 Soviet report suggested that the design of the Space Shuttle had been guided by a requirement to deliver a payload- such as a bomb- over Russia and return to land after a single orbit. This may have been a confusion based on requirements 3A and 3B for the shuttle's design, which required the craft to be able to deploy or retrieve an object from a polar orbit in a single pass.

Both the Soviets and the United States developed anti-satellite weaponry designed to shoot down satellites. While early efforts paralleled other space-to-space warfare concepts, the United States was able in the 1980s to develop ground-to-space laser anti-satellite weapons. None of these systems are known to be active today; however, a less powerful civilian version of the ground-to-space laser system is commonly used in the astronomical technique of adaptive optics.

In 1984, the Strategic Defence Initiative (SDI) was proposed. It was nicknamed Star Wars after the popular science fiction franchise Star Wars.

In 1985, the United States demonstrated its conventional ASAT capabilities by launching an ASM-135 ASAT from an F-15 to shoot down the Solwind P78-1, an American research satellite, from its 555-kilometre (345 mi) orbit.

The 1990–1991 Gulf War is sometimes called the "first space war" for its usage of satellite communication, navigation, reconnaissance, and weapons guidance.

=== Since 2000 ===
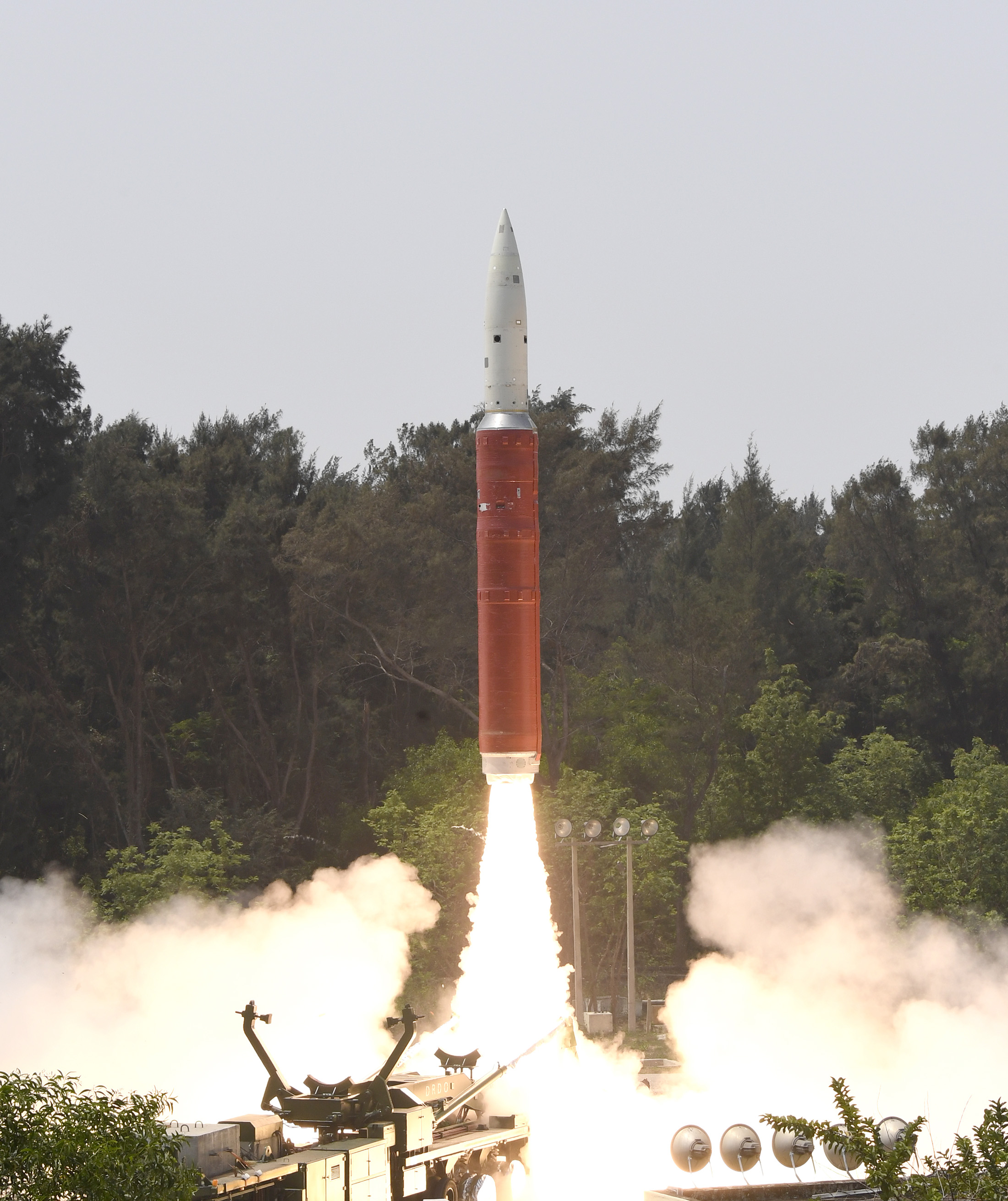
Launch of an interceptor derived from Indian Ballistic Missile Defence Programme for ASAT test on March 27, 2019

The People's Republic of China successfully tested (see 2007 Chinese anti-satellite missile test) a ballistic missile-launched anti-satellite weapon on January 11, 2007. This resulted in harsh criticism from the United States of America, Britain, and Japan.

The U.S. developed an interceptor missile, the SM-3, testing it by hitting ballistic test targets while they were in space. On February 21, 2008, the U.S. used an SM-3 missile to destroy a spy satellite, USA-193, while it was 247 kilometers (133 nautical miles) above the Pacific Ocean.

In 2009, the chairman of the Israel Space Agency said the Arrow 3 anti-ballistic missile could be used as an anti-satellite weapon. The missile was declared operational in 2017.

Japan fields the U.S.-made SM-3 missile, and there have been plans to base the land-based version in Romania and Vietnam.

In March 2019, India shot down a satellite orbiting in a low Earth orbit using an ASAT missile during an operation code named Mission Shakti, thus making its way to the list of space warfare nations, establishing the Defense Space Agency the following month, followed by its first-ever simulated space warfare exercise on July 25 which would inform a joint military space doctrine.

In July 2019, Emmanuel Macron "called for a space high command to protect" France's satellites. This was followed by a plan released by military officials. French Defense Minister, Florence Parly, announced a space weapons program that would move the country's space surveillance strategy towards active protection of its assets in space, e.g., satellites. The projects outlined include: patrolling nano-satellites swarms, ground-based laser systems to blind spying satellites, and machine guns mounted on satellites.

Starlink, SpaceX's large low Earth orbit satellite constellation, was extensively used for warfare following Russia's invasion of Ukraine after the country's previous satcom provider Viasat were cyberattacked in the first few days of the invasion. Starlink was used for defense and attacks on Russian positions, with Starlink terminals being namely strapped on strike drones and sea drones. SpaceX vowed and acted against the use of their Starlink service for active warfare, while Russia launched cyberattacks against Starlink and threatened of striking Starlink satellites directly in retaliation.

On October 31, 2023, as part of the Gaza war, Israel intercepted a Houthi ballistic missile with its Arrow 2 missile defense system. According to Israeli officials, the interception occurred above Earth's atmosphere above the Negev Desert, making it the first instance of space combat in history.

On November 21, 2024, as part of the Russian invasion of Ukraine, Russia launched a new Oreshnik intermediate-range ballistic missile, striking Dnipro. Ukraine's air force initially claimed an intercontinental ballistic missile (range greater than 5,500 km) was used, and Ukrainian media initially reported it was an RS-26 Rubezh ICBM with range 5,800 km. The US and Russia confirmed it was intermediate-range (3,000–5,500 km), but the Pentagon stated it was based on the RS-26 ICBM. It was fired from the Astrakhan region 700 km away. Analysts stated the missile used a multiple independently targetable reentry vehicle (MIRV), likely marking their first use in combat. The night attack was reported to see six sequential vertical flashes, each comprising a cluster of up to six individual projectiles. UN spokesperson Stéphane Dujarric called the use of the intermediate-range weapon "concerning and worrying".

As of 2025, space situational awareness is generally limited between countries. Countries rely on doctrinal statements, media reports, international treaties and codes of conduct, and the like to signal their approaches to the development and use of counterspace capabilities.

The Air Force Secretary, Troy Meink, disclosed at an Air & Space Forces Association conference on September 14, 2026 that the United States had already deployed via the U.S. Space Force active "on-orbit space control weapons capable of defending the joint force against hostile adversary action".

== Theoretical space weaponry ==
A counterspace attack is one which inhibits an adversary's ability to use space for civilian purposes or national security purposes.

=== Ballistic warfare ===
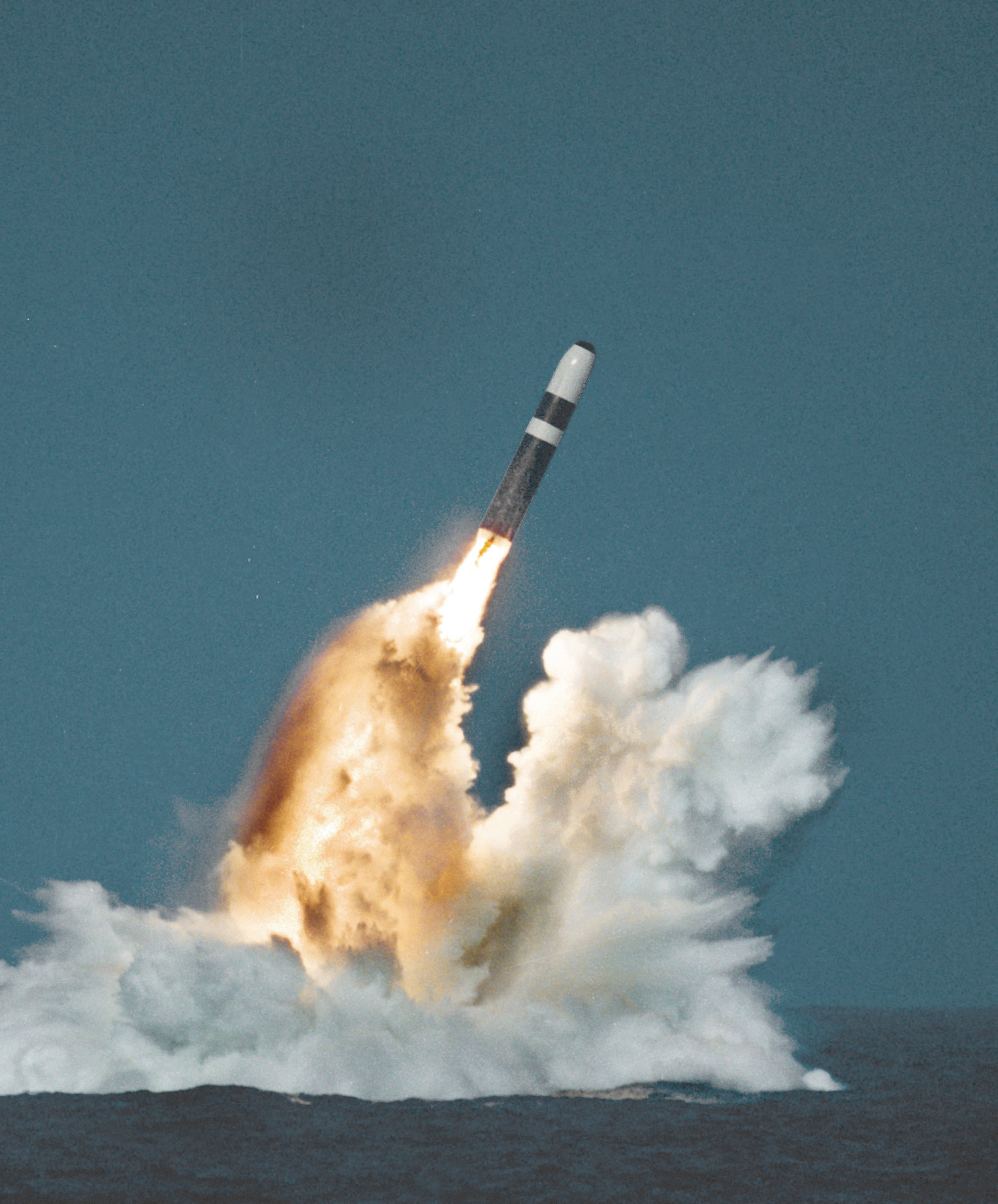
A Trident missile launched from a Royal Navy Vanguard-class ballistic missile submarine

In the late 1970s and through the 1980s, the Soviet Union and the United States theorized, designed and in some cases tested a variety of weaponry designed for warfare in outer space. Space warfare was seen primarily as an extension of nuclear warfare, and many theoretical systems were based around the destruction or defense of ground and sea-based missiles. Space-based missiles were not attempted due to the Outer Space Treaty, which banned the use, testing or storage of nuclear weapons outside the Earth's atmosphere. When the U.S. gained "interest in utilizing space-based lasers for ballistic missile defense", two facts emerged. One being that the ballistic missiles are fragile and two, chemical lasers project missile killing energy (3,000 kilometers). This meant that lasers could be put into space to intercept a ballistic missile.

Systems proposed ranged from measures as simple as ground and space-based anti-missiles to railguns, space based lasers, orbital mines and similar weaponry. Deployment of these systems was seriously considered in the mid-1980s under the banner of the Strategic Defense Initiative announced by Ronald Reagan in 1983, using the term "evil empire" to describe the Soviets (hence the popular nickname "Star Wars"). If the Cold War had continued, many of these systems could potentially have seen deployment: the United States developed working railguns, and a laser that could destroy missiles at range, though the power requirements, range, and firing cycles of both were impractical. Weapons like the space-based laser was rejected, not just by the government, but by universities, moral thinkers, and religious people because it would have increased the waging of the arms race and questioned the United States' role in the Cold War.

=== Electronic warfare ===
With the end of the Cold War and continued development of satellite and electronics technology, attention was focused on space as a supporting theatre for conventional warfare. Currently, military operations in space primarily concern either the vast tactical advantages of satellite-based surveillance, communications, and positioning systems or mechanisms used to deprive an opponent of said tactical advantages.

Accordingly, most space-borne proposals which would traditionally be considered "weapons" (a communications or reconnaissance satellite may be useful in warfare but isn't generally classified as a weapon) are designed to jam, sabotage, and outright destroy enemy satellites, and conversely to protect friendly satellites against such attacks. To this end, the US (and presumably other countries) is researching groups of small, highly mobile satellites called "microsats" (about the size of a refrigerator) and "picosats" (approximately 1 cubic foot (≈27 litres) in volume) nimble enough to maneuver around and interact with other orbiting objects to repair, sabotage, hijack, or simply collide with them.

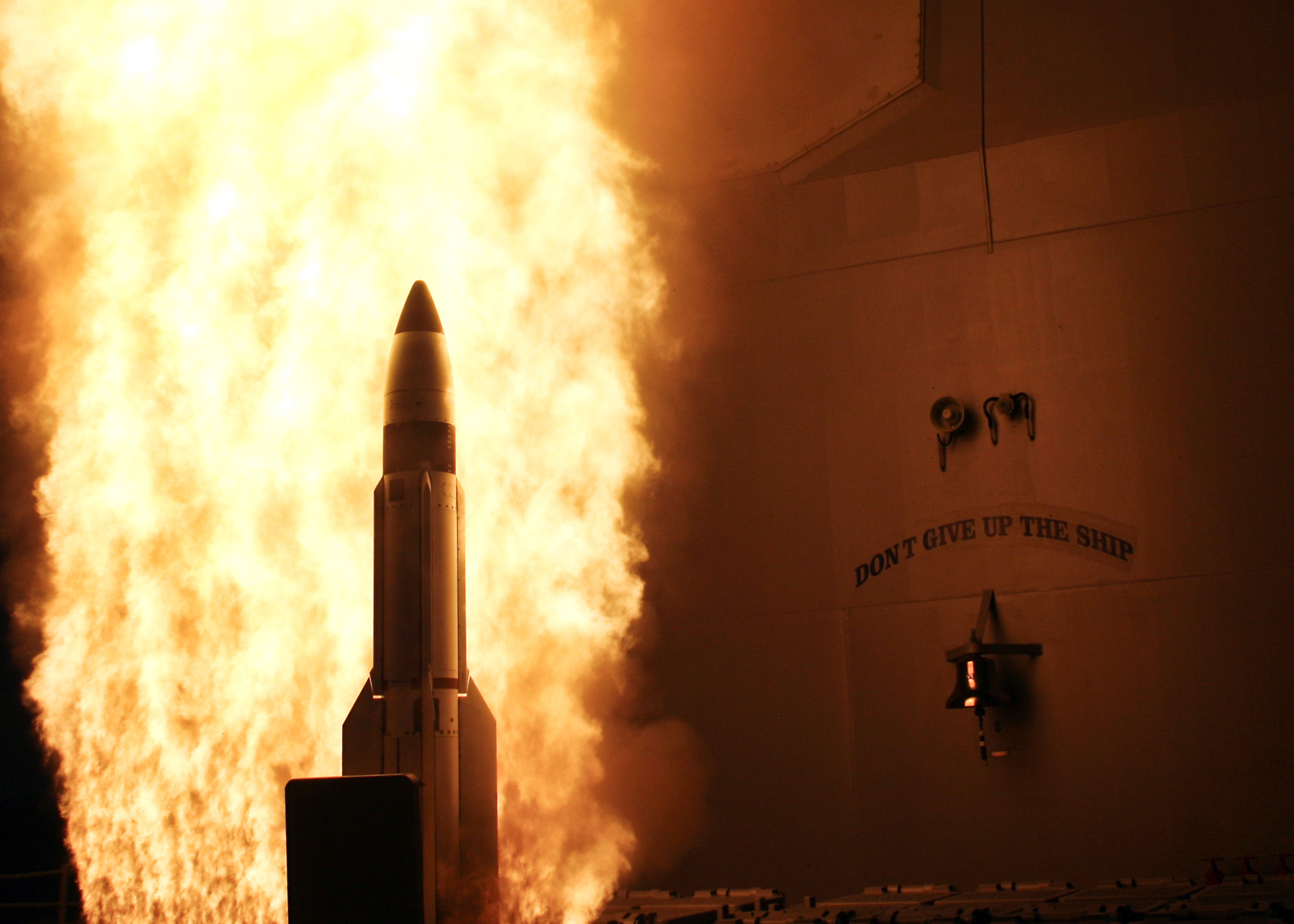
A SM-3 missile is launched from a U.S. ship to intercept a spy satellite.

=== Kinetic bombardment ===
Kinetic weapons collide with their targets. In the context of space warfare, kinetic weapons could include missiles launched from earth (direct ascent weapons) or co-orbital weapons fired by satellites or other spacecraft in orbit.

A theorized use involves the extension of conventional weaponry into orbit for deployment against ground targets. Though international treaties ban the deployment of nuclear missiles outside the atmosphere, other categories of weapons are largely unregulated. Traditional ground-based weapons are generally not useful in orbital environments, and few if any would survive re-entry even if they were, but as early as the 1950s, the United States has toyed with kinetic bombardment, i.e. orbiting magazines of non-explosive projectiles to be dropped onto hardened targets from low Earth orbit.

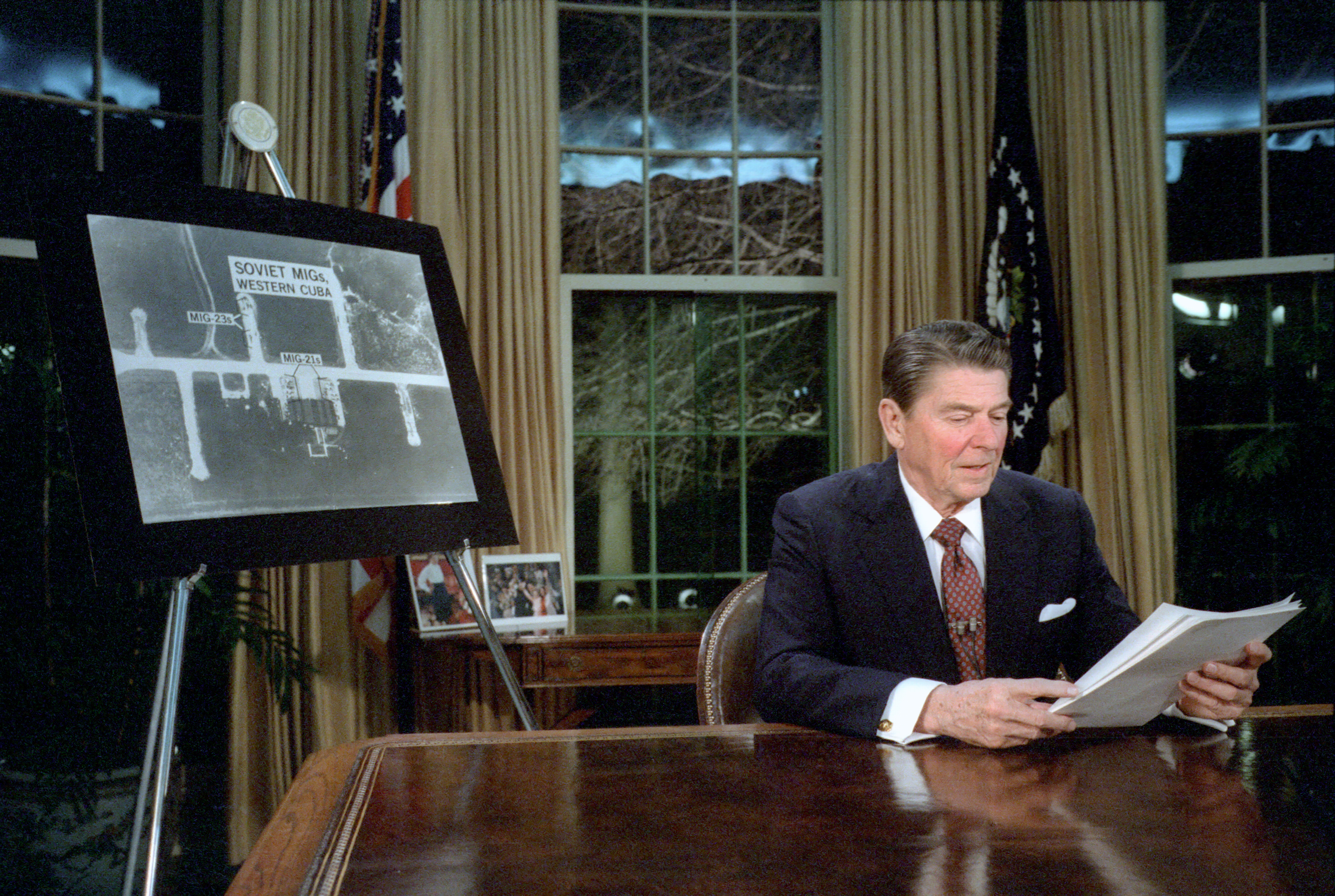
Ronald Reagan revealing the idea for the Strategic Defense Initiative on March 23, 1983

Kinetic weapons have always been widespread in conventional warfare—bullets, arrows, swords, clubs, etc.—but the energy a projectile would gain while falling from orbit would make such a weapon rival all but the most powerful explosives. A direct hit would presumably destroy all but the most hardened targets without the need for nuclear weapons.

Such a system would involve a 'spotter' satellite, which would identify targets from orbit with high-power sensors, and a nearby 'magazine' satellite to de-orbit a long, needle-like tungsten dart onto it with a small rocket motor or dropping a large rock from orbit (such as an asteroid, cf. Ivan's hammer). This would be more useful against a larger but less hardened target (such as a city). Though a common device in science fiction, there is no publicly available evidence that any such systems have actually been deployed by any nation.

=== Directed-energy weapons ===
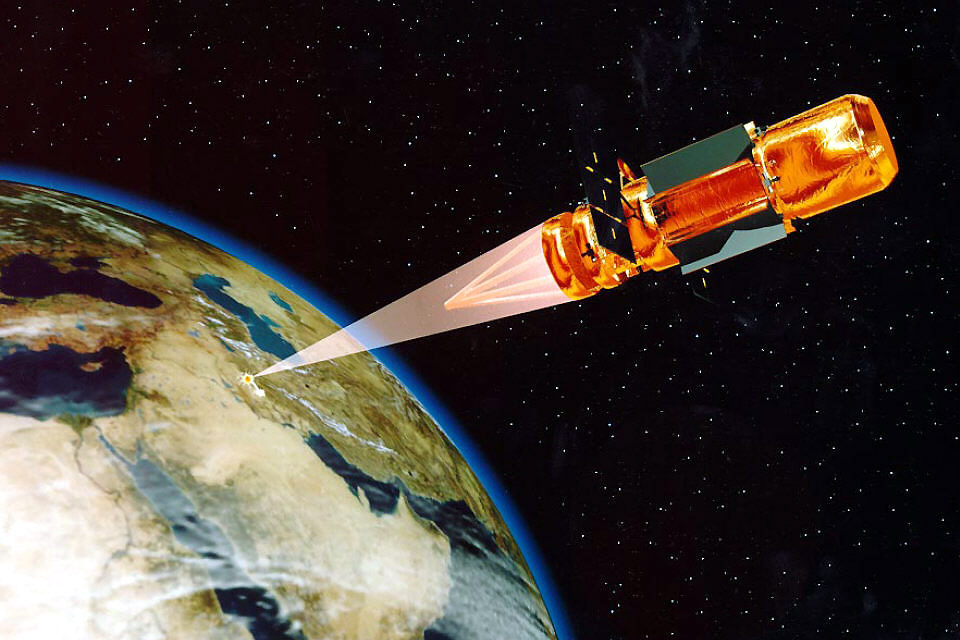
A vision for the future of the US Space Command for 2020: a space-based high-energy laser destroys a terrestrial target

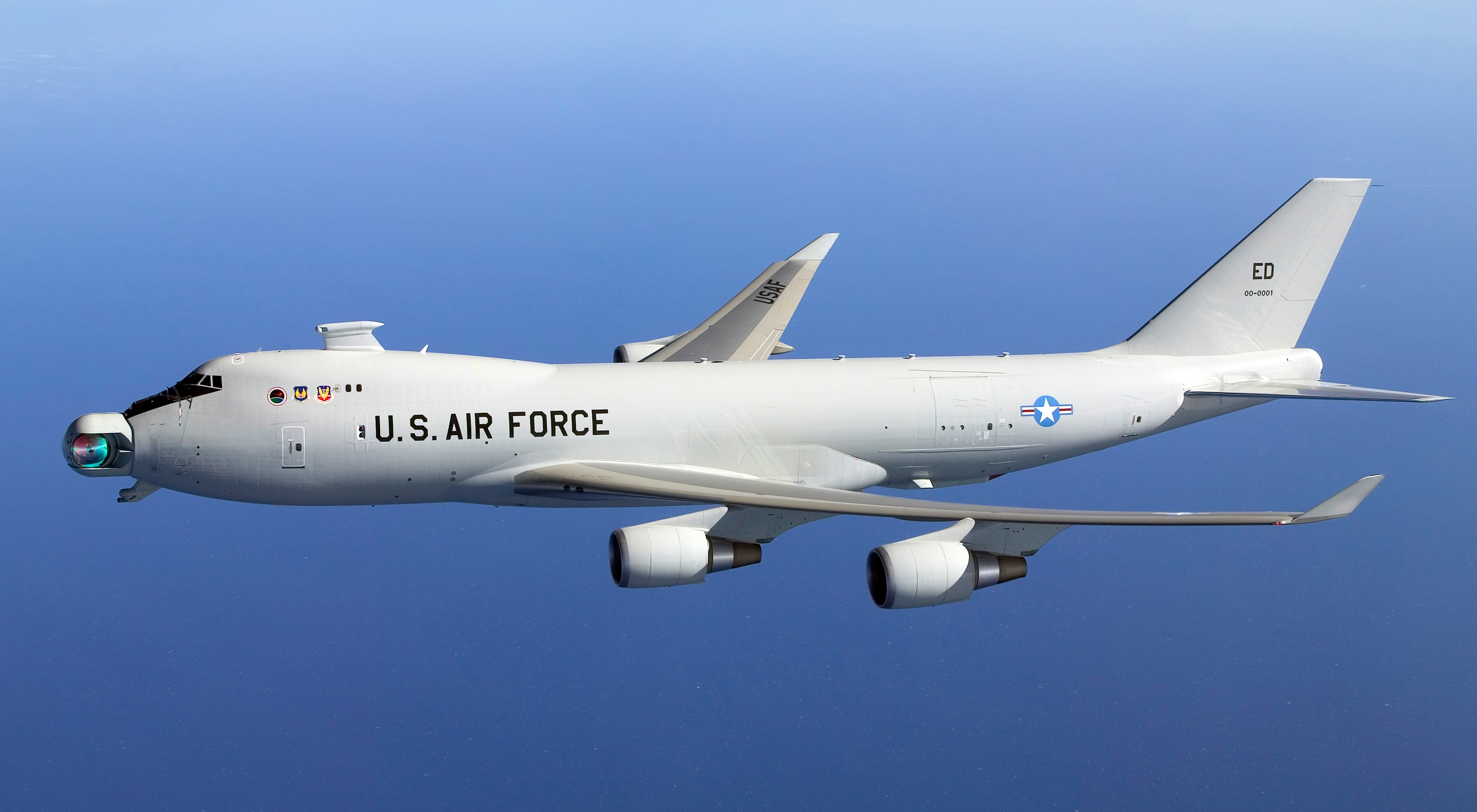
A USAF Boeing YAL-1 airborne laser

Weapon systems that fall under this category include lasers, linear particle accelerators or particle-beam based weaponry, microwaves and plasma-based weaponry. Particle beams involve the acceleration of charged or neutral particles in a stream towards a target at extremely high velocities, the impact of which creates a reaction causing immense damage. Most of these weapons are theoretical or impractical to implement currently, aside from lasers which have been used to blind satellites and are starting to be used in terrestrial warfare. That said, directed-energy weapons are more practical and more effective in a vacuum (i.e. space) than in the Earth's atmosphere, as in the atmosphere the particles of air interfere with and disperse the directed energy.

In the context of space-based deployment, directed-energy weapons can be distinguished as either “high-powered” or “dazzler.” High-powered satellite-operated lasers are intended to deal irreversible damage to the sensitive parts, mainly optics, on satellites and have the advantage of being difficult to attribute to an actor. Though, it is difficult to confirm the success of an attack. Dazzlers are not intended to deal irreversible damage but rather disable a target satellite. It maintains the same advantages and disadvantages as the high-powered variant. Though such systems not yet functional, the US Defense Intelligence Agency notes that several actors, including the United States, PRC, Russia, and France, are actively pursuing these capabilities.

== Practical considerations ==
Space warfare is likely to be done at far larger distances and speeds than combat on Earth. The vast distances pose big challenges for targeting and tracking, as even light requires a few seconds to cover hundreds of thousands of kilometers. For example, if trying to fire on a target at the distance of the Moon from the Earth, one sees the position of the target slightly more than a second earlier. Thus even a laser would need ~1.28 seconds, meaning a laser-based weapon system would need to lead a target's apparent position by 1.28×2 = 2.56 seconds. A projectile from a railgun recently tested by the US Navy would take over 18 hours to cross that distance, if it travels in a straight line at a constant velocity of 5.8 km/s along its entire trajectory.

Three factors make engaging targets in space very difficult. First, the vast distances mean that an error of even a fraction of a degree in the firing solution can mean a miss by thousands of kilometers. Second, spaceflight involves tremendous speeds by terrestrial standards—a geostationary satellite moves at 3.07 km/s, and objects in low Earth orbit move at ~8 km/s. Third, though distances are huge, targets remain relatively small. The International Space Station, currently the largest artificial object in Earth orbit, measures slightly over 100 m at its largest span. Other satellites can be vastly smaller, e.g., Quickbird measures only 3.04m. External ballistics for stationary terrestrial targets is enormously complicated—some of the earliest analog computers were used to calculate firing solutions for naval artillery, as the problems were already beyond manual solutions in any reasonable time—and targeting objects in space is far harder. And, though not a problem for orbital kinetic weapons, any directed energy weapon would need huge amounts of electricity. So far the most practical batteries are lithium, and the most practical means of generating electricity in space is photovoltaic modules, which are currently only up to 30% efficient, and fuel cells, which have limited fuel. Current technology might not be practical for powering effective lasers, particle beams, and railguns in space. In the context of the Strategic Defense Initiative, the Lawrence Livermore National Laboratory in the United States worked on a project for expandable space-based x-ray lasers powered by a nuclear explosion, Project Excalibur, a project canceled in 1992 for lack of results. SDI projects included Zenith Star, using the Alpha chemical laser.

General William L. Shelton has said that in order to protect against attacks, Space Situational Awareness is much more important than additional hardening or armoring of satellites. The Air Force Space Command has indicated that their defensive focus will be on "Disaggregated Space Architectures".

=== Space debris ===
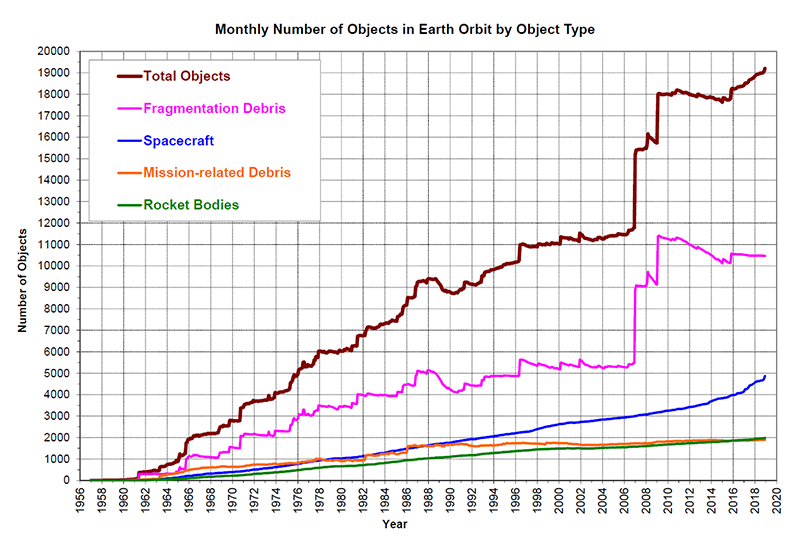
Graph of the historical extent of space debris. The 2007 Chinese anti-satellite missile test and 2009 satellite collision are visible as two major events.

Anti-satellite attacks, especially ones with kinetic kill vehicles, can form space debris which can stay in orbit for many years and could interfere with future space activity or in a worst case trigger Kessler syndrome. In the worst-case scenario of Kessler syndrome, collisions among debris and space objects become self-sustaining, although this scenario would require a vast amount of debris and a long time period.

In January 2007, China conducted an anti-satellite missile test which caused more than 40,000 new chunks of debris with a diameter over 1 cm. This remains the most significant space debris event ever by number of fragments generated, despite subsequent destructive anti-satellite missile tests by other nations. China is reported to be developing "soft-kill" techniques such as jamming and vision kills that do not generate much debris.

=== Risk to other activities ===
Space warfare creates risks to other activities, including risks to human beings in orbit, risks to commercial space activity, and creating difficulties for launching payloads to higher orbits.

=== Political considerations ===
Countries which engage in space warfare would presumably face reputational costs for violating the 1967 Outer Space Treaty.

== Possible warfare over space ==
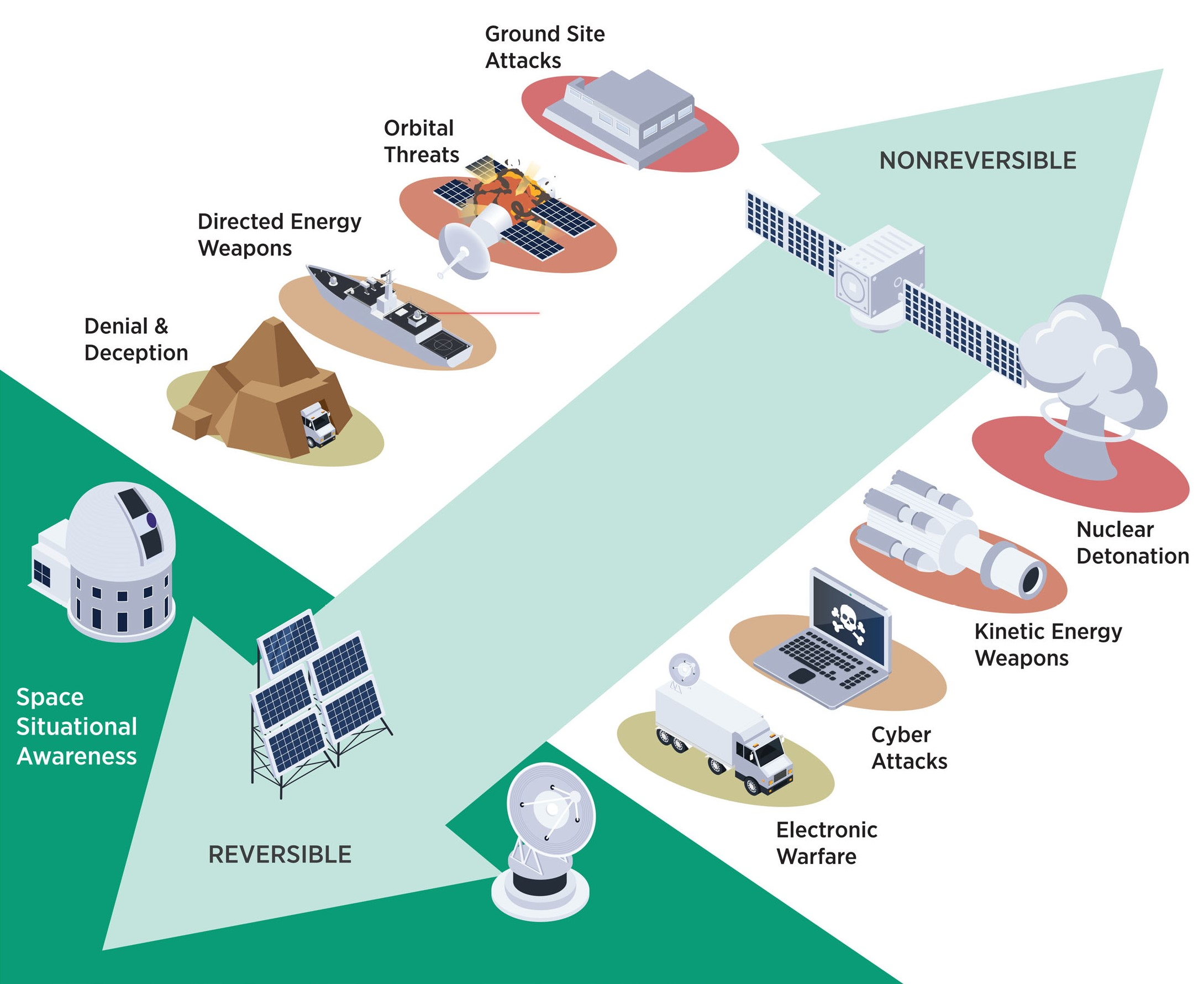
Counterspace Threat Continuum

Most of the world's communications systems rely heavily on the presence of satellites in orbit around Earth. Protecting these assets might seriously motivate nations dependent upon them to consider deploying more space-based weaponry, especially in conflicts involving advanced countries with access to space.

Since 2017, the United States Air Force has run an annual military exercise called "Space Flag" at Peterson Space Force Base, which involves a red team simulating attacks on U.S. satellites.

Analysts have referred to anti-satellite weapons as an asymmetric weapon, arguing that China and Russia pursued them to make up for their weaker conventional forces compared to the United States.Robert Zubrin, aerospace engineer and advocate for human exploration of Mars, stated that as anti-satellite weapons capabilities of nations increase, space infrastructures must be able to defend themselves using other satellites that can destroy such weapons. Or else, he states, satellite-based navigation, communications and reconnaissance capabilities would be severely limited and easily influenced by adversaries.

In April 2022, the United States announced a unilateral ban on its own tests of destructive direct-ascent anti-satellite weapons.

=== Direct ascent ===
The modern incarnations of the ASM-135 ASAT program are the so-called direct-ascent anti-satellite weapons. These weapons are usually either ballistic or anti-ballistic interceptor missiles, which ascend directly from Earth to intercept their target and have been adapted to the anti-satellite role. To date, four countries have demonstrated their ability to launch these weapons, the US, the PRC, India, and Russia, but so far none have conducted such an attack on another country's satellites.

Direct-ascent ASATs leverage existing technologies and launch platforms to neutralize both space-based and ground-based targets. This option tends to be highly destructive and indiscriminate as any attack will produce space debris, which can indiscriminately affect other satellites in similar orbits. While this option comes with the benefit of leveraging existing technologies and a certain element of surprise, as an attack cannot be detected until a missile has exited its silo, there are significant downsides. Firstly, there is the cost disparity of using an ICBM or ABM to kill a small and inexpensive satellite. Additionally, these missiles are not designed to send payloads out to geocentric orbit, as such they can only affect targets in low earth orbit and only in a target area centered around the static location of the missile itself.

=== Co-orbital ===
Co-orbital systems come with a few potential kill mechanisms: in guided kinetic vehicles, like the Multiple Kill Vehicle, or in the form of a satellite that can release a kinetic interceptor or a cloud of debris. The first co-orbital system, Istrebitel Sputnikov, was developed by the Soviet Union in the 1970s and reportedly utilized one of these mechanisms.

There are allegations that Russia continues to test co-orbital ASAT weapons as recently as 2020. In 2020 the U.S. State Department claimed that a Russian satellite, Cosmos-2519, exhibited behavior “inconsistent” with its intended mission. While in orbit, Kosmos-2519 deployed a smaller satellite, which Russian state media claimed: “conducted autonomous flight, a change in orbit, and a satellite inspection before returning to the base station”. Another incident back in 2019 involved two Russian satellites, Kosmos 2542 and 2543, one of which appeared to begin following a U.S. national security satellite. Such “inspector” satellites can be armed with lasers to provide non-destructive interference or deadly kinetic interceptors.

While these co-orbital systems provide more utility when compared to more direct and destructive options, their advantages are contingent on being maneuverable and inconspicuous. Given the increasing paranoia surrounding co-orbital anti-satellite, it is hard to believe that the major players in space will fail to notice the deployment of “research” satellites.

== Space warfare in science fiction ==
Space warfare is a staple of science fiction, where it is shown with a wide range of realism and plausibility. Fictional space warfare includes anticipated future technology and tactics, and fantasy- or history-based scenarios in a scifi setting. Some portray a space military as like an air force; others depict a more naval framework. Still others suggest forces more like space marine: highly mobile forces doing interplanetary and interstellar war but most of the conflict happens in terrestrial environments. The main sub-genres of the space warfare in science fiction thematic genre are space opera, Military and Space Western. Though sword and planet stories like Finisterre universe by C. J. Cherryh might be considered, they rarely feature such technologies. These three genres often intertwine and have themes that are common to all. Written Space Westerns are often based directly on existing established scifi space opera franchises with expanded universes like Star Wars and Star Trek, including Warhammer 40,000: the most popular space opera military miniature wargame which spawned successful spin-off media: novels, video-games and on-going live adaption based on books by Dan Abnett.

Both kinetic and directed energy weapons are often seen, along with various military space vessels. E. E. Smith's Lensman is an early example, which also inspired the term space opera due to the grandiose scale of the stories. Orson Scott Card's Ender's Game series is a notable example in that it makes a conjecture as to what sort of tactics and training would be needed for war in outer space. Other scifi authors have also delved into the tactics of space combat, such as David Weber in his Honorverse series, and Larry Niven and Jerry Pournelle in their Mote in God's Eye series. A more recent example is Alastair Reynolds' Revelation Space universe, which explores combat at relativistic speed. Robert A. Heinlein's Starship Troopers is perhaps one of the best-known and earliest explorations of the "space marine" idea.

Space-based vehicular combat is portrayed in many movies and video games, most notably Star Wars, Stargate, Halo, Descent, Gundam, Macross, Babylon 5, Star Trek, "Children of a Dead Earth", and Star Citizen. Games such as the Homeworld series have interesting concepts for space warfare, such as 3D battle formations, plasma-based projectors that get their energy from a ship's propulsion system, and automated uncrewed space combat vehicles. Other series, such as Gundam, prominently show vehicular combat in and among many near future concepts, such as O'Neill cylinders.

Fictional galaxies with space warfare are far too many to list, but popular examples include Star Trek (in all of its forms), Star Wars, Halo, Stargate, Warhammer 40,000, Babylon 5, Buck Rogers, Flash Gordon, Battlestar Galactica, Mass Effect, Freespace and many comic book franchises. Video games often touch the subject; the Wing Commander franchise is a prototypical example. Few games try to simulate realistic distance and speed, though Independence War and Frontier: Elite II both do, as does the board game Attack Vector: Tactical.

Many authors have either used a galaxy-spanning fictional empire as background or written about the growth and/or decline of such an empire. Said empire's capital is often a core world, such as a planet relatively close to a galaxy's supermassive black hole. Characterization can vary wildly from malevolent forces attacking sympathetic victims to apathetic bureaucracies to more reasonable entities focused on social progress, and anywhere in between. Scifi writers generally posit some form of faster-than-light drive in order to facilitate interstellar war. Writers such as Larry Niven and duo James S. A. Corey have developed plausible interplanetary conflict based on human colonization of the asteroid belt and outer planets via technologies using currently known physics.

== See also ==
- Asteroid impact avoidance
- Beijing–Washington space hotline
- Militarisation of space
- Schriever wargame
- Space force
- Space weapon
- Starlink satellite services in Ukraine, instance of a satellite constellation being used for warfare
- Sun outage

Related to specific countries and facilities:

- Department of Defense Manned Space Flight Support Office
- European Aeronautic Defense and Space Company
- Joint Functional Component Command for Space and Global Strike (US Strategic Command)
- National Missile Defense
- Pine Gap (Australia)
- United States Air Force Space Command
- United States Army Space and Missile Defense Command
