= Spacecom (disambiguation) =

Spacecom is a satellite communications company.

Spacecom may also refer to:

- Space.com, a space technology website
- Space Command (disambiguation)
- United States Space Command
