= Space Corps =

Space Corps, may refer to:

- Space force, a military branch of a country's armed forces
- Space Corps (comics), the outer-space arm of the Mega-City One Judges
- United States Space Corps, a proposed name for the U.S. Space Force

== See also ==
- Space Force (disambiguation)
- Space Command (disambiguation)
