= Aerospace force =

Aerospace force or air and space force may refer to:

- Aerospace Force of the Islamic Revolutionary Guard Corps (NEHSA)
- Colombian Aerospace Force (FAC)
- People's Liberation Army Aerospace Force of China
- French Air and Space Force (AAE)
- Israeli Air and Space Arm
- Royal Netherlands Air and Space Force (RNLASF)
- Russian Aerospace Forces (VKS)
- Spanish Air and Space Force

== See also ==
- Space force
- Space Force (disambiguation)
- Air Force (disambiguation)
- Force (disambiguation)
- Air force
