= Luftstreitkräfte (disambiguation) =

Luftstreitkräfte is a German word which literally means air force. In particular it may refer to:

- Luftstreitkräfte, the Imperial German Army Air Service during World War I (only called the Luftstreitkräfte from 1916)
- Luftstreitkräfte der NVA, the air force of the German Democratic Republic (1956 to 1990)
- Austrian Air Force, known in German as the Österreichische Luftstreitkräfte

== See also ==
- Luftwaffe (disambiguation), similar term used for the German and Swiss air forces
