= Air force (disambiguation) =

An air force is armed service that primarily conducts aerial warfare.

Air Force can also refer to:

== Arts and entertainment ==
- Air Force (film), a 1943 war film directed by Howard Hawks
- Airforce (TV series), a 1988 miniseries featuring the Republic of Singapore Air Force
- The Air Force, the fifth album of the band Xiu Xiu
- "Air Force", a 1978 song by Space
- "Air Forces", a song by Young Jeezy from his 2005 album Let's Get It: Thug Motivation 101
- "Air Force", a 2018 song by DigDat
- Ginger Baker's Air Force, a jazz-rock supergroup in the early 1970s led by Ginger Baker
- Air Force (game), a 1976 wargame about WWII aerial combat over Europe

== Sports teams ==
- Air Force Falcons, the intercollegiate sports program of the US Air Force Academy
- Air Force Central F.C., a professional Thai football club based in Rangsit
- Air Force FC, a South Korean military sports club that merged with others which later became Sangju Sangmu FC
- Air Force Sports Club, a Sri Lankan football club based in Colombo

== Other uses ==
- Numbered Air Force, in the United States Air Force, an organizational unit that is subordinate to a major command
- Air Force (shoe), a range of athletic shoes made by Nike, Inc.
- Airforce Airguns, an American airgun company

== See also ==
- Al-Quwa Al-Jawiya, an Iraqi football club from Baghdad whose name means Air Force SC in Arabic
- Aerospace Force (disambiguation)
