= Star force =

Star force may refer to:

- Star Force, a 1984 video game by Tecmo
- Mega Man Star Force, a video game in the Mega Man franchise
- The South Australian STAR Force, a police tactical group similar to SWAT in the United States
- Starforce, a Marvel Comics team formed of super-powered Kree
- StarForce: Alpha Centauri, a science fiction board game copyright 1974 by Simulations Publications, Inc.
- Star Force, a military-like team that served aboard the Argo in the animation series Star Blazers.
- StarForce Technologies, a Russian software developer with headquarters in Moscow.
- Star Force: Fugitive Alien II, one of the TV movies that Star Wolf (TV series) was edited into

== See also ==
- Space force (disambiguation)
