= Space Command (disambiguation) =

A space command is a military organization with responsibility for space operations and warfare (the article also lists organizations known as Space Command).

Space Command may also refer to:

- Space Command (TV series), a 1950s Canadian television programme
- Space Command, a 1979 arcade game from Irem
- Zenith Space Command, an early television remote control by Zenith Electronics
- United Nations Space Command, a fictional faction in the Halo video game
- Space Command, a prospective series of films by Marc Scott Zicree

== See also ==
- Space Corps (disambiguation)
- Space Force (disambiguation)
