= Strategic Rocket Forces (disambiguation) =

Strategic rocket forces may refer to:

- Strategic Rocket Forces, Russian strategic rocket forces
- Strategic Rocket Forces (North Korea), North Korean strategic rocket forces, known as Artillery Guidance Bureau

== See also ==
- People's Liberation Army Rocket Force, China
- Rocket Forces and Artillery (Ukraine)
- Royal Saudi Strategic Missile Force
