= Ivan's hammer =

Using asteroids as kinetic weapons

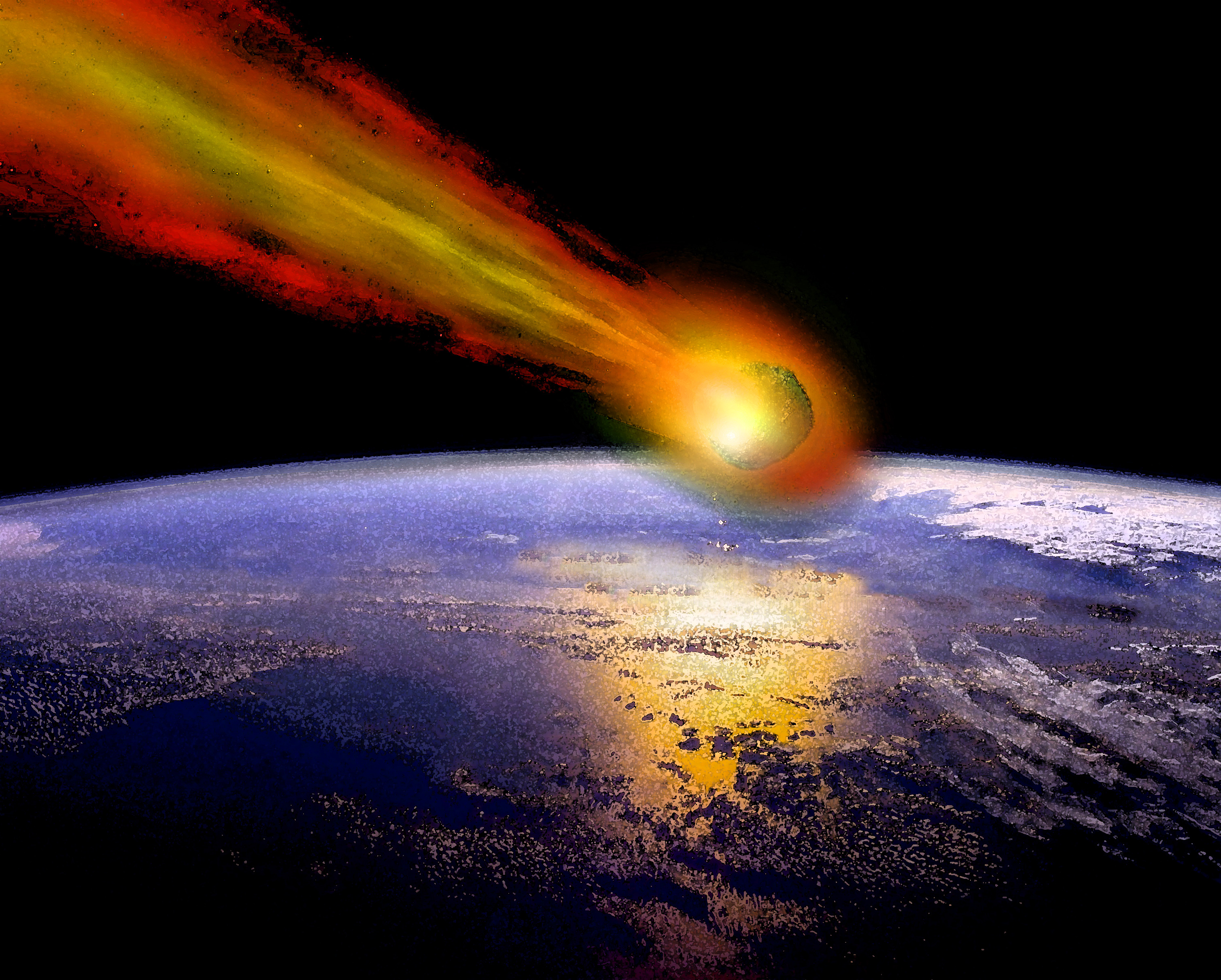
Illustration of an asteroid on track for Earth

Ivan's Hammer is the idea to use a natural asteroid or meteoroid as a weapon of mass destruction in a first-strike role. The concept can be traced back to the 1960s. At the annual meeting of the American Astronautical Society, in January, 1962 Dandridge M. Cole warned that as early as 1970 the Soviets could develop the technology to divert a near earth asteroid to impact a target on earth.

A RAND Corporation study from 2002 also discusses the method and feasibility of such an application. The American astronomer Carl Sagan warned about the possibility of asteroid deflection technology being used as a weapon in several works, describing a "deflection dilemma" for projects seeking to address the asteroid impact hazard.

== See also ==
- Directed-energy weapon
- Laser weapon
- Space weapon
- Kinetic bombardment
- Prompt Global Strike
