= 17F111 Cascade =

Soviet military satellite

The 17F111 Cascade ('Kaskad') project was an orbital anti-satellite weapon developed by NPO Energia. The project aimed to create a satellite that could fire missiles at the satellites of the opposition in order to take them down. It would have been launched by either the Proton-K or the Buran space shuttle.

== Origins ==
In 1983, the United States announced the launch of the strategic defense initiative which aimed to protect the country from missile attacks. This prompted the USSR, under the lead of Chernenko and Gorbachov, to increase security measures. Initially, they mirrored the US's plans to create defense systems targeting ICBMs as this was now the chosen delivery method for nuclear warheads. However, shortly into the project, the USSR ministry of defense determined that the fight against ICBMs would be too complex and as a result effective anti-satellite weapons would be prioritised. Thus, the 'Skif' and 'Cascade' systems entered development.

== Design ==
The project was led by Valentin Glushko and headed by general designer Dmitry Alekseevich Polukhin at the Sulyut Design Bureau. The design was based on the core module of the Mir space station with 10 space-to-space missiles attached. The system was intended to be refuelable and would be supplied by the Buran shuttle. The missiles were developed in collaboration with Aleksandr Nudelman's firm and were sufficiently effective that they were planned to be installed on Progress 7K-TG cargo vehicles for testing in orbit. Five of these entered production at Energia's experimental production plant but were eventually returned to their original purpose of cargo delivery. Each missile contained a small amount of fuel, an engine, and some explosive.

== Abandonment of the project ==
The project was eventually abandoned in favour of its sister system 'Skif-D' in the early 90s. The 'Skif' system went on to succeed in terrestrial tests before a launch was attempted. However, this launch was a failure due to a catastophic malfunction that caused it to return to a ballistic trajectory after launch.

== See also ==
- Anti-satellite weapon – Kinetic energy device designed to destroy satellites in orbit
- Polyus (spacecraft) – Soviet space weapon prototype
- Soviet space program – Space exploration program conducted by the Soviet Union from 1951 to 1991
