= Space Force (disambiguation) =

A space force is a military branch that conducts space warfare.

Space Force may also refer to:

== Arts and entertainment ==
- Space Force (TV pilot), a 1978 pilot for a television series
- Space Force (BBC radio serial), 1984–1985
- Space Force (TV series), an American comedy TV series
- Space Force: Rogue Universe, a video game
- Space Force (album), an album by Todd Rundgren
- Space Force, a fictional entity in British TV series Hyperdrive
- Starcom: The U.S. Space Force, a 1987 American animated TV series developed alongside NASA
- Royal Space Force, a Japanese animated TV series

== Military ==
- United States Space Force, the space service branch of the U.S. Armed Forces
- Russian Space Forces, a branch of the Russian Aerospace Forces
- List of space forces

== See also ==
- Space Command (disambiguation)
- Space Corps (disambiguation)
- Star force (disambiguation)
