= Airforce Airguns =

- Industry: Air Rifles
- Founded: 1994 in Fort Worth, Texas, United States
- Headquarters: United States
- Website: www.airforceairguns.com

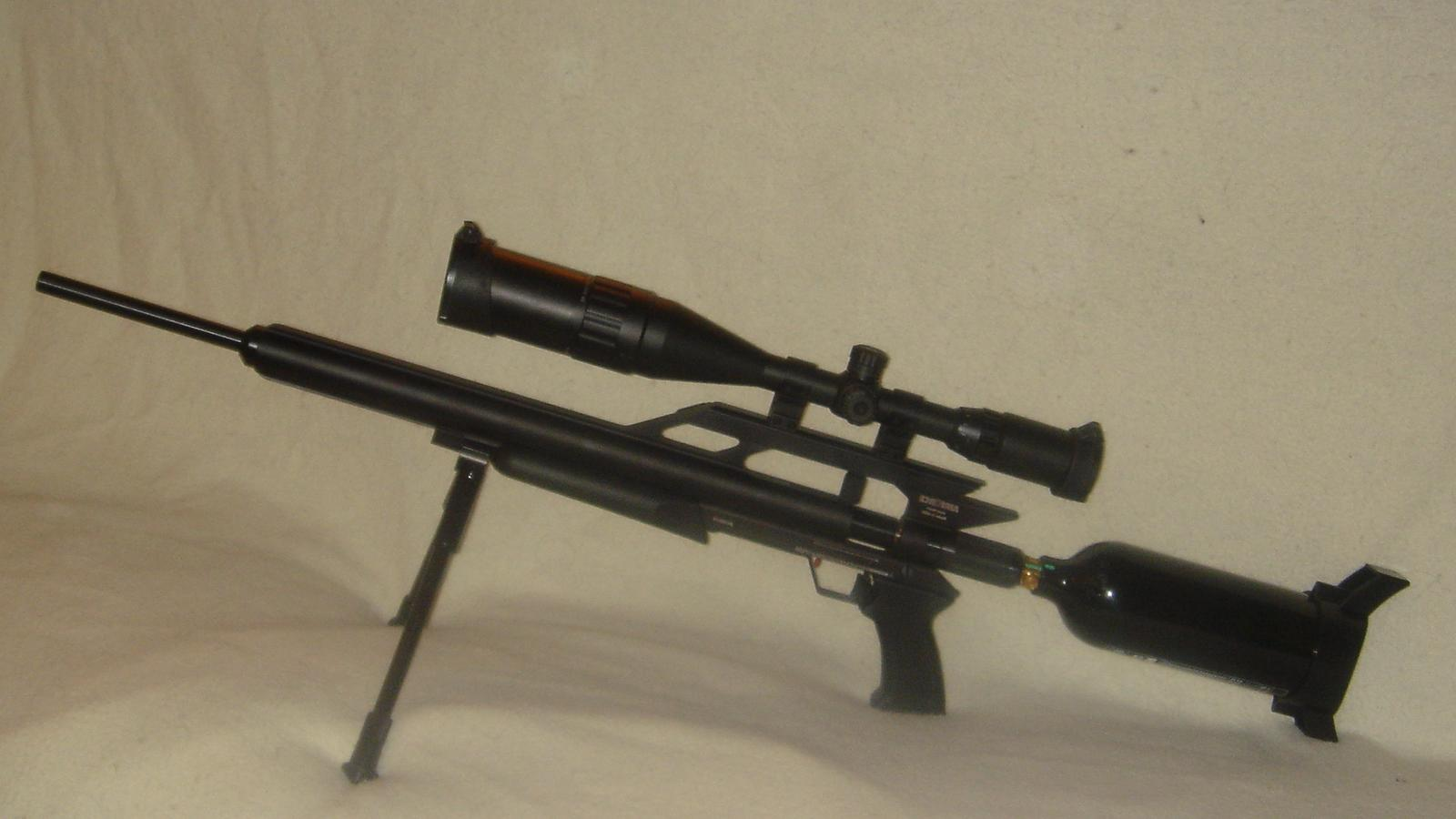
Airforce Condor with CO _{2} Tank

Airforce Airguns (aka. Gunpower Airguns in the United Kingdom) is an American manufacturer of pre-charged pneumatic air rifles. The company was founded in 1994 in Fort Worth, Texas. The rifles were designed to be lightweight, accurate, and inexpensive. The design also allowed easy attachment of accessories, as well be easily adjustable in power.

The original model named the Talon (Storm), was released in 1999. In the 2001 a second model was released, the Talon SS (Shadow). The Talon SS included a longer frame and shorter barrel and this combination resulted in a quieter rifle. Since air guns are not "firearms" they are not regulated by BATFE so barrel length isn't an issue. The Talon SS is being used extensively by the U.S. Department of Agriculture for pest elimination. A more powerful model was released in 2004, -the Condor (SSS). The Condor used a larger valve, heavier hammer, and longer barrel to produce more power than either the Talon SS or the original Talon, and was touted as the "Most powerful mass-produced .22 caliber airgun made". The most recent model released is a pistol variation of the Talon platform known as the TalonP. This model is only offered in .25 caliber, and when combined with heavy pellets makes well over 50 ftlbs. of energy at the muzzle. Air Force now offers .25 caliber in all of its models.

The rifles are made largely from aluminum, but, where necessary, as in the trigger mechanism, steel is used. The barrels are manufactured by the German company Lothar Walther. Barrels can be swapped to change either caliber or power level of the rifle.

A pistol version, the TalonP, using the Talon frame, a 12" Talon SS barrel and a newer half size tank provides a compact but powerful addition to the product line.

Two additional rifle models have been added, the Escape and the Texan. The Escape is marketed as a lighter weight survival rifle and is a hybrid of parts from the earlier models and consists of a Talon frame, a Condor 24" barrel and a TalonP tank with a buttstock. Originally released in 25cal, now offered in 22, the Escape provides a smaller number of shots due to the smaller TalonP tank and can be more quickly refilled by a handpump. Two addition Escape variants are offered, the UL model which uses an 18" Talon barrel and the SS model which uses a TalonSS frame, 12" barrel and SoundLoc baffles. The Texan is a big bore rifle initially offered in .457 then later in .357 and .308 and in the .457 version is advertised at the 500fpe power level. The Texan is now offered in .257. Two additional versions of the Texan are offered, the Texan Carbine and the TexanSS both use a shorter 24" barrel with later equipped with an upsized SoundLoc system. Both are offered in .308, .357 and .457 calibers.

The Airforce airguns extend hunting capabilities from vermin and small game through varmint, predator and medium size game.
