= Polyus (spacecraft) =

Soviet space weapon prototype

- Mission type: Military technology
- Mission duration: Spacecraft failure

Spacecraft properties
- Launch mass: 80,000 kilograms (180,000 lb)
- Dimensions: 37 m × 4.10 m

Start of mission
- Launch date: 15 May 1987
- Rocket: Energia
- Launch site: Baikonur 250

Orbital parameters
- Reference system: Geocentric
- Regime: Low Earth
- Perigee altitude: 280 km (170 mi)
- Apogee altitude: 280 km (170 mi)
- Inclination: 64°

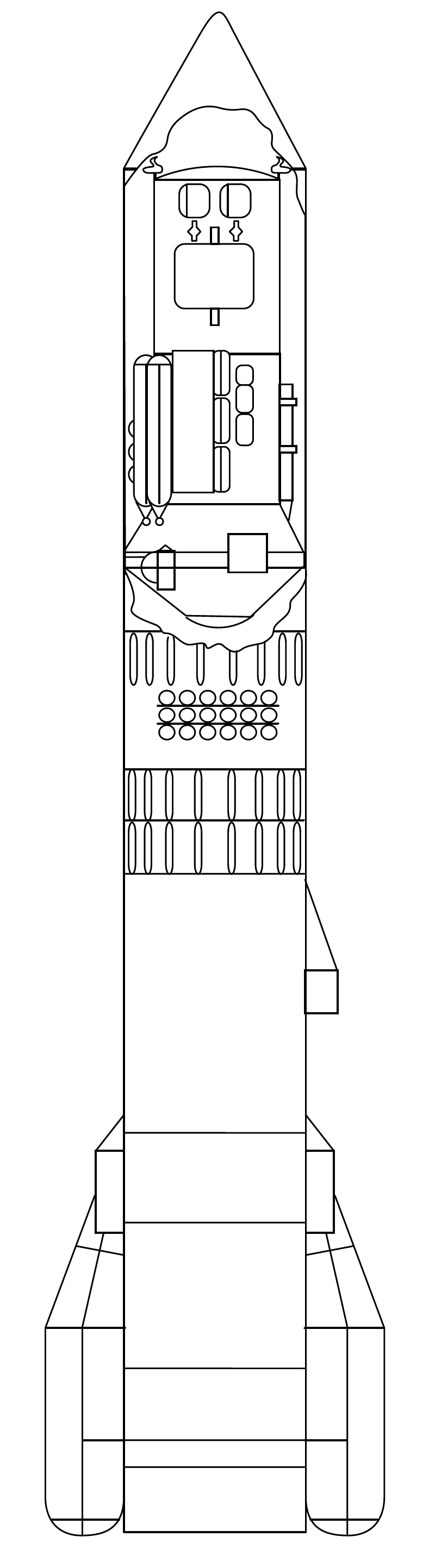
Cutaway drawing of the Polyus spacecraft

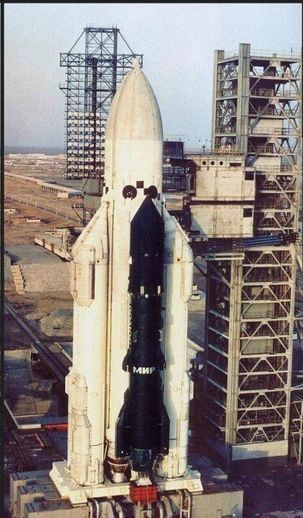
Polyus on the Energia rocket

The Polyus spacecraft (Russian: Полюс, pole), also known as Polus, Skif-DM, GRAU index 17F19DM, was a prototype Soviet orbital weapons platform designed to destroy Strategic Defense Initiative satellites with a megawatt carbon-dioxide laser. It had a Functional Cargo Block derived from a TKS spacecraft to control its orbit and it could launch test targets to demonstrate the fire control system.

== History ==
The Polyus spacecraft was launched 15 May 1987 from Baikonur Cosmodrome Site 250 as part of the first flight of the Energia system, but failed to reach orbit.

According to Yuri Kornilov, Chief Designer of the Salyut Design Bureau, shortly before Polyus' launch, Mikhail Gorbachev visited the Baikonur Cosmodrome and expressly forbade the in-orbit testing of its capabilities. Kornilov claims that Gorbachev was worried that it would be possible for Western governments to view this activity as an attempt to create a weapon in space and that such an attempt would contradict the country's previous statements on the USSR's peaceful intent.

For technical reasons, the payload was launched upside down. It was designed to separate from the Energia, rotate 180 degrees in yaw, then 90 degrees in roll and then fire its engine to complete its boost to orbit. The Energia functioned perfectly, however, after separation from Energia, Polyus spun a full 360 degrees instead of the planned 180 degrees. When the engine fired, it slowed the vehicle, which burned up over the south Pacific Ocean. This failure was attributed to a faulty inertial guidance system that had not been rigorously tested due to the rushed production schedule.

Parts of the Polyus project's hardware were re-used in Kvant-2, Kristall, Spektr and Priroda Mir modules, as well as in the ISS modules Zarya and Nauka.

== Development ==
NPO Energia received orders from the Soviet government to begin research on space-based strike weapons in the mid-1970s. Even before, the USSR had been developing maneuverable satellites for the purpose of satellite interception. By the beginning of the 1980s, Energia had proposed two programs: laser-equipped Skif and guided missiles platform Kaskad (where Skif would cover the low-orbit targets, Kaskad engaged targets in high and geosynchronous orbits). Together with NPO Astrofizika and KB Salyut, they began developing their orbital weapons platform based on the Salyut DOS-17K frame.

Later, when the objective of ICBM interception proved too difficult, the aims of the project were shifted towards anti-satellite weapons. The 1983 announcement by the US of their SDI program prompted further political and financial support for the satellite interceptor program. In the nuclear exchange scenario, the interceptors would destroy the SDI satellites, followed by a so-called "pre-emptive retaliation" large-scale Soviet ICBM launch.

The laser chosen for the Skif spacecraft was a 1-megawatt carbon dioxide laser, developed for the Beriev A-60 aircraft (an Il-76 flying laboratory with a combat laser). The introduction of the Energia, capable of launching about 95 tonnes into orbit, finally allowed the spacecraft to accommodate the massive laser. The exhaust of the carbon-dioxide laser precipitated the objective of making the laser "recoil-less". The zero-torque exhaust system (SBM) was developed to that end. Its testing in orbit meant the release of a large cloud of carbon dioxide, which would hint at the satellite's purpose. Instead, the xenon-krypton mix would be used to simultaneously test the SBM and perform an innocent experiment on Earth's ionosphere.

In 1985, the decision was made to test-launch the new Energia launch vehicle, which was still in the testbed phase. A 100-ton dummy payload was initially considered for the launch, but in a series of last-minute changes, it was decided that the almost-completed Skif spacecraft would be launched instead for a 30-day mission.

The development of the real Skif was completed in just one year, from September 1985 to September 1986. Testing and tweaking the Energia launch vehicle, the launch pad and the Skif itself moved the launch to February, and later to May 1987. According to Boris Gubanov, the head designer of the Energia launch vehicle, the work schedule of the preceding years was exhausting, and at the point of Mikhail Gorbachev's visit on 11 May, he asked the Soviet premier to clear the launch now, because "there will be heart attacks".

The catastrophic malfunction that led to Skif entering the atmosphere in the same area as Energia's second stage was successfully investigated. It was found that 568 seconds after launch, the timing control device gave the logical block a command to discard the side modules' covers and laser exhaust covers. Unknowingly, the same command was earlier used to open the solar panels and disengage the maneuvering thrusters. This was not discovered because of the logistics of the testing process and overall haste. Main thrusters engaged while the Skif kept turning, overshooting the intended 180-degree turn. The spacecraft lost speed and reverted to a ballistic trajectory.

== Specifications ==
- Length: 37.00 m (121.39 ft)
- Maximum diameter: 4.10 m (13.5 ft)
- Mass: 80,000 kg (180,000 lb)
- Associated launch vehicle: Energia
- Intended orbit: altitude 280 km (170 mi), inclination 64°
- Targeting system: optical, radar, with low-yield laser for final targeting
- Armament: 1-megawatt carbon-dioxide laser

== See also ==
- Almaz
- Terra-3 ASAT
- Soviet space program
- Space race
- 17F111 Cascade
