= Yo-yo de-spin =

Device used to reduce the spin of satellites, typically soon after launch

Animation showing a PAM-D with the Phoenix spacecraft. The stage is successively spun, fired, yo-yo de-spun and jettisoned.

A yo-yo de-spin mechanism is a device used to reduce the spin of satellites, typically soon after launch. It consists of two lengths of cable with weights on the ends. The cables are wrapped around the final stage and/or satellite, in the manner of a double yo-yo. When the weights are released, the spin of the rocket flings them away from the spin axis. This transfers enough angular momentum to the weights to reduce the spin of the satellite to the desired value. Subsequently, the weights are often released.

De-spin is needed since some final stages are spin-stabilized, and require fairly rapid rotation (now typically 30-60 rpm; some early missions, such as Pioneer, rotated at over 600 rpm) to remain stable during firing. (See, for example, the Star 48, a solid fuel rocket motor.) After firing, the satellite cannot be simply released, since such a spin rate is beyond the capability of the satellite's attitude control. Therefore, after rocket firing but before satellite release, the yo-yo weights are used to reduce the spin rates to something the satellite can cope with during detumbling in normal operation (often 2-5 RPM). Yo-yo de-spin systems are commonly used on sub-orbital sounding rocket flights, as the vehicles are spin stabilized through ascent and have minimal flight time for roll cancellation using the payload's attitude control system.

As an example of yo-yo de-spin, on the Dawn spacecraft, roughly 3 kilograms (6.6 lb) of weights, and 12-metre (39 ft) cables, reduced the initial spin rate of the 1,420-kilogram (3,130 lb) spacecraft from 46 RPM to 3 RPM in the opposite direction. The relatively small weights have a large effect since they are far from the spin axis, and their effect increases as the square of the length of the cables.

Yo-yo de-spin was invented, built, and tested at Caltech's Jet Propulsion Laboratory.

Yo-yo hardware can contribute to the space debris problem on orbital missions, but this is not a problem when used on the upper stages of earth escape missions such as Dawn, as the cables and weights are also on an escape trajectory.

== Yo-weight ==
Sometimes only a single weight and cable is used. Such an arrangement is colloquially named a "yo-weight." When the final stage is a solid rocket, the stage may continue to thrust slightly even after spacecraft release. This is from residual fuel and insulation in the motor casing outgassing, even without significant combustion. In a few cases, the spent stage has rammed the payload, for example in the fourth launch attempt of Ohsumi, third stage of Lambda 4S rocket collided with the fourth stage. By using one weight without a matching counterpart, the stage eventually tumbles. The tumbling motion prevents residual thrust from accumulating in a single direction. Instead, the stage's exhaust averages out to a much lower value over a wide range of directions.

In March 2009, a leftover yo-weight caused a scare when it came too close to the International Space Station.

== See also ==
- Attitude dynamics and control
- Momentum exchange tether
- Space debris
