= Space debris =

Pollution around Earth by defunct artificial objects

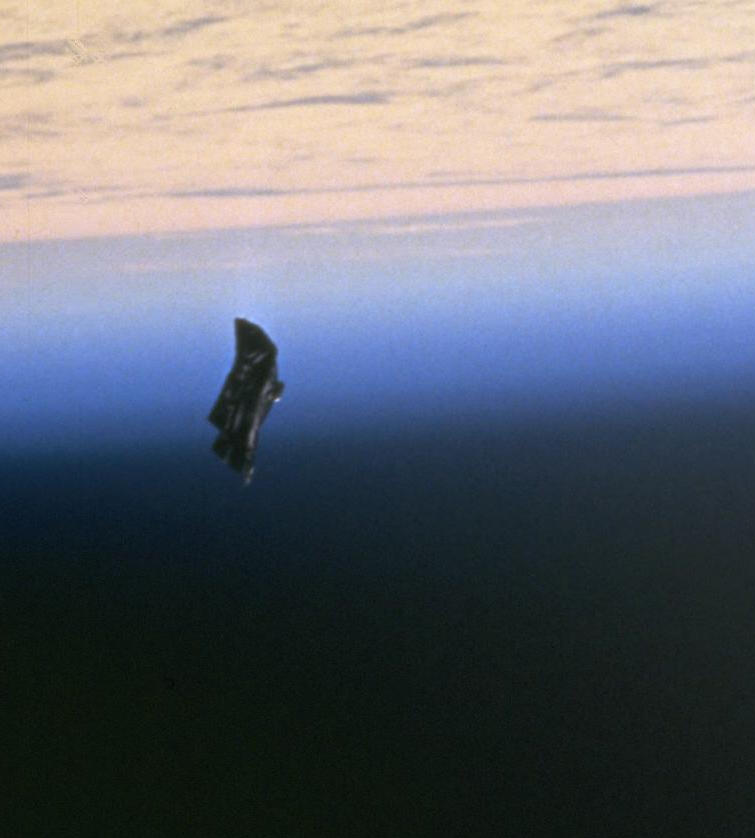
A drifting thermal blanket photographed in 1998 during STS-88

Space debris (also known as space junk, space pollution, space waste, space trash, space garbage, orbital space debris or cosmic debris) are defunct human-made objects in space – principally in Earth orbit – which no longer serve a useful function. These include derelict spacecraft (nonfunctional spacecraft and abandoned launch vehicle stages), mission-related debris, and fragmentation debris from the breakup of derelict rocket bodies and spacecraft. In addition to derelict human-made objects left in orbit, space debris includes fragments from disintegration, erosion, or collisions; solidified liquids expelled from spacecraft; unburned particles from solid rocket motors; and even paint flecks. Space debris represents a risk to spacecraft.

Space debris is typically a negative externality. It creates an external cost on others from the initial action to launch or use a spacecraft in near-Earth orbit, a cost that is typically not taken into account nor fully accounted for by the launcher or payload owner.

Several spacecraft, both crewed and un-crewed, have been damaged or destroyed by space debris. The measurement, mitigation, and potential removal of debris is conducted by some participants in the space industry.

As of April 2025, the European Space Agency's Space Environment statistics reported 40,230 artificial objects in orbit above the Earth regularly tracked by Space Surveillance Networks and maintained in their catalogue.

However, these are just the objects large enough to be tracked and in an orbit that makes tracking possible. Satellite debris that is in a Molniya orbit, such as the Kosmos Oko series, might be too high above the Northern Hemisphere to be tracked. As of January 2019, more than 128 million pieces of debris smaller than 1 cm (0.4 in), about 900,000 pieces of debris 1–10 cm, and around 34,000 of pieces larger than 10 cm (3.9 in) were estimated to be in orbit around the Earth. When the smallest objects of artificial space debris (paint flecks, solid rocket exhaust particles, etc.) are grouped with micrometeoroids, they are together sometimes referred to by space agencies as MMOD (Micrometeoroid and Orbital Debris).

Collisions with debris have become a hazard to spacecraft. The smallest objects cause damage akin to sandblasting, especially to solar panels and optics like telescopes or star trackers that cannot easily be protected by a ballistic shield.

Below 2,000 km (1,200 mi), pieces of debris are denser than meteoroids. Most are dust from solid rocket motors, surface erosion debris like paint flakes, and frozen coolant from Soviet nuclear-powered satellites. For comparison, the International Space Station (ISS) orbits in the 300–400 kilometres (190–250 mi) range, while the two most recent large debris events, the 2007 Chinese antisatellite weapon test and the 2009 satellite collision, occurred at 800 to 900 kilometres (500 to 560 mi) altitude. The ISS has Whipple shielding to resist damage from small MMOD. However, known debris with a collision chance over 1/10,000 are avoided by maneuvering the station.

According to a report published in January 2025, scientists are encouraging vigilance around closing airspace more often to avoid collisions between airline flights and space debris reentering the earth's atmosphere amid an increasing volume of both. Following a destructive event, the explosion of SpaceX's Starship Flight 7 on January 16, 2025, the US Federal Aviation Administration (FAA) slowed air traffic in the area where debris was falling. This prompted several aircraft to request diversion because of low fuel levels while they were holding outside the Debris Response Area.

== History ==
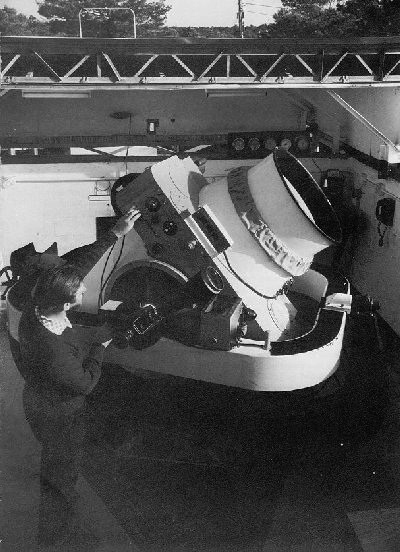
Baker–Nunn cameras were widely used to study space debris.

Space debris began to accumulate in Earth orbit with the launch of the first artificial satellite, Sputnik 1, launched into orbit in October 1957. But even before this event, humans might have produced ejecta that became space debris, as in the August 1957 Pascal B test. Space debris for example was ejected in 1957 purposefully from an Aerobee launch system in a likely failed attempt to reach for the first time escape velocity from Earth, and therefore space beyond Earth. Going back further, natural ejecta from Earth has entered orbit.

After the launch of Sputnik, the North American Aerospace Defense Command (NORAD) began compiling a database (the Space Object Catalog) of all known rocket launches and objects reaching orbit, including satellites, protective shields and upper-stages of launch vehicles. NASA later published modified versions of the database in two-line element sets, and beginning in the early 1980s, they were republished in the CelesTrak bulletin board system.

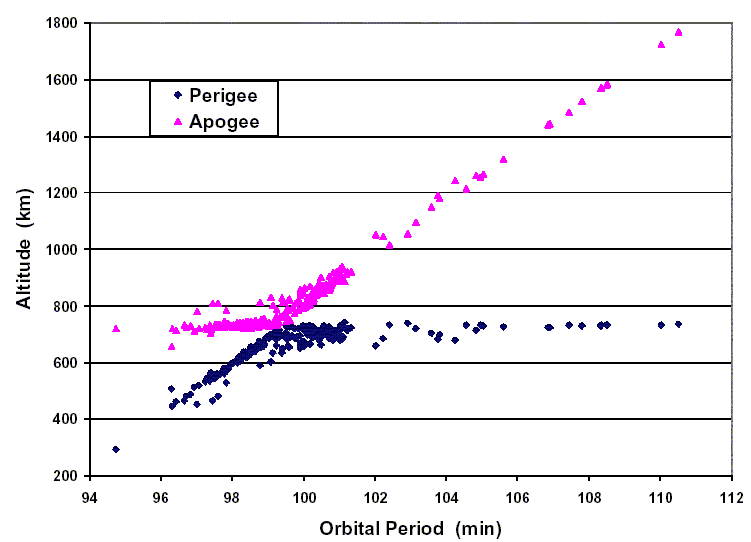
Gabbard diagram of almost 300 pieces of debris from the disintegration of the five-month-old third stage of the Chinese Long March 4 booster on 11 March 2000

NORAD trackers who fed the database were aware of other objects in orbit, many of which were the result of in-orbit explosions. Some were deliberately caused during anti-satellite weapon (ASAT) testing in the 1960s, and others were the result of rocket stages blowing up in orbit as leftover propellant expanded and ruptured their tanks. More detailed databases and tracking systems were gradually developed, including Gabbard diagrams, to improve the modeling of orbital evolution and decay.

When the NORAD database became publicly available during the 1970s, techniques developed for the asteroid-belt were applied to the study of known artificial satellite objects.

Time and natural gravitational/atmospheric effects help to clear space debris. A variety of technological approaches have also been proposed, though most have not been implemented. A number of scholars have observed that systemic factors, political, legal, economic, and cultural, are the greatest impediment to the cleanup of near-Earth space. There has been little commercial incentive to reduce space debris since the associated cost does not accrue to the entity producing it. Rather, the cost falls to all users of the space environment who benefit from space technology and knowledge. A number of suggestions for increasing incentives to reduce space debris have been made. These would encourage companies to see the economic benefit of reducing debris more aggressively than existing government mandates require. In 1979, NASA founded the Orbital Debris Program to research mitigation measures for space debris in Earth orbit.

=== Debris growth ===
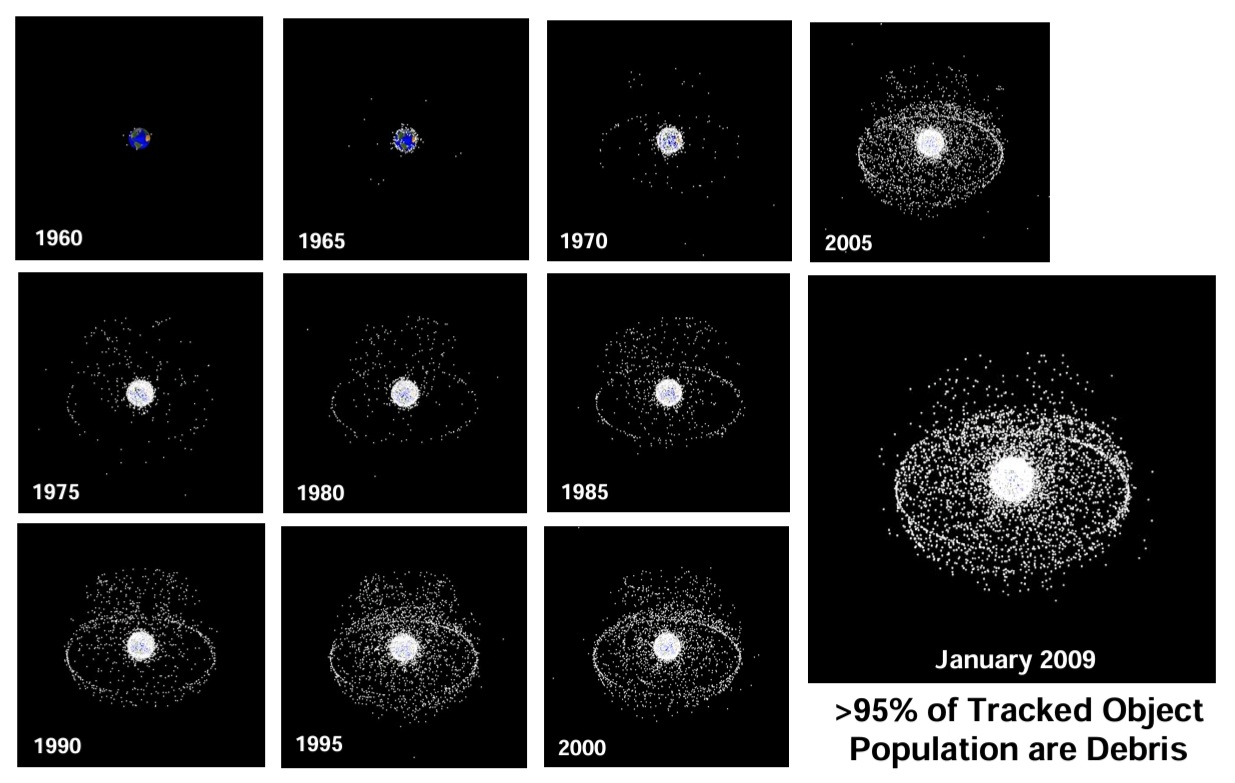
NASA computer-generated image of growth of space debris

During the 1980s, NASA and other US groups attempted to limit the growth of debris. One trial solution was implemented by McDonnell Douglas in 1981 for the Delta launch vehicle by having the booster move away from its payload and vent any propellant remaining in its tanks. This eliminated one source for pressure buildup in the tanks which had previously caused them to explode and create additional orbital debris. Other countries were slower to adopt this measure and, due especially to a number of launches by the Soviet Union, the problem grew throughout the decade.

A new battery of studies followed as NASA, NORAD, and others attempted to better understand the orbital environment, with each adjusting the number of pieces of debris in the critical-mass zone upward. Although in 1981 (when Schefter's article was published) the number of objects was estimated at 5,000, new detectors in the Ground-based Electro-Optical Deep Space Surveillance system found new objects. By the late 1990s, it was thought that most of the 28,000 launched objects had already decayed and about 8,500 remained in orbit. By 2005 this was adjusted upward to 13,000 objects remaining in orbit, and a 2006 study increased the number to 19,000 as a result of an ASAT and a satellite collision. In 2011, NASA said that 22,000 objects were being tracked.

A 2006 NASA model suggested that if no new launches took place, the environment would retain the then-known population until about 2055, when it would increase on its own. Richard Crowther of Britain's Defence Evaluation and Research Agency said in 2002 that he believed the cascade would begin about 2015. The US National Academy of Sciences, summarizing the professional view, noted widespread agreement that two bands of LEO space – 900 to 1,000 km (620 mi) and 1,500 km (930 mi) – were already past critical density.

In the 2009 CEAS European Air and Space Conference, University of Southampton researcher Hugh Lewis predicted that the threat from space debris would rise 50 percent in the next decade and quadruple in the next 50 years. As of 2009, more than 13,000 close calls were tracked weekly.

A 2011 report by the US National Research Council warned NASA that the amount of orbiting space debris was at a critical level. According to some computer models, the amount of space debris "has reached a tipping point, with enough currently in orbit to continually collide and create even more debris, raising the risk of spacecraft failures." The report called for international regulations limiting debris and research of disposal methods.

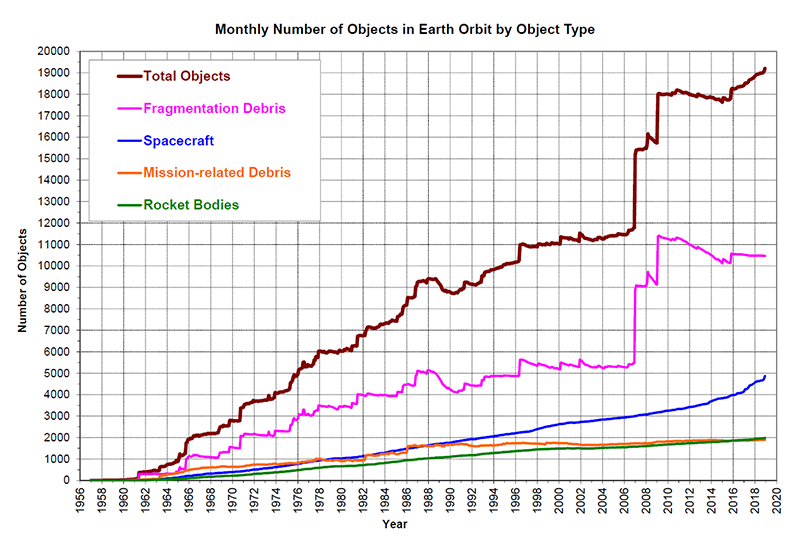
Objects in Earth orbit including fragmentation debris, November 2020, NASA: ODPO

==== Debris history in particular years ====
- By mid-1994 there had been 68 breakups or debris "anomalous events" involving satellites launched by the former Soviet Union/Russia and 18 similar events had been discovered involving rocket bodies and other propulsion-related operational debris.
- As of 2009, 19,000 pieces of debris over 5 cm (2 in) were tracked by the United States Space Surveillance Network.
- As of July 2013, estimates of more than 170 million pieces of debris smaller than 1 cm (0.4 in), about 670,000 pieces 1–10 cm, and approximately 29,000 larger pieces were in orbit.
- As of July 2016, nearly 18,000 artificial objects were orbiting above Earth, including 1,419 operational satellites.
- As of October 2019, nearly 20,000 artificial objects were in orbit above the Earth, including 2,218 operational satellites.
- As of 2025, about 40,000 objects were regularly tracked by space surveillance networks and maintained in their catalogue, of which about 11,000 were active satellites—a steep rise over the preceding decade driven largely by the deployment of large commercial satellite constellations. By mid-2026, the tracked catalogue had grown to about 45,900 objects.

== Characterization ==
=== Size and numbers ===
As of January 2019 there were estimated to be over 128 million pieces of debris smaller than 1 cm (0.39 in), and approximately 900,000 pieces between 1 and 10 cm. The count of large debris (defined as 10 cm across or larger) was 34,000 in 2019, and at least 37,000 by June 2023. The technical measurement cut-off is c. 3 mm (0.12 in).

As of 2020, there were 8,000 metric tons of debris in orbit, a figure that is expected to increase.

=== Low Earth orbit ===
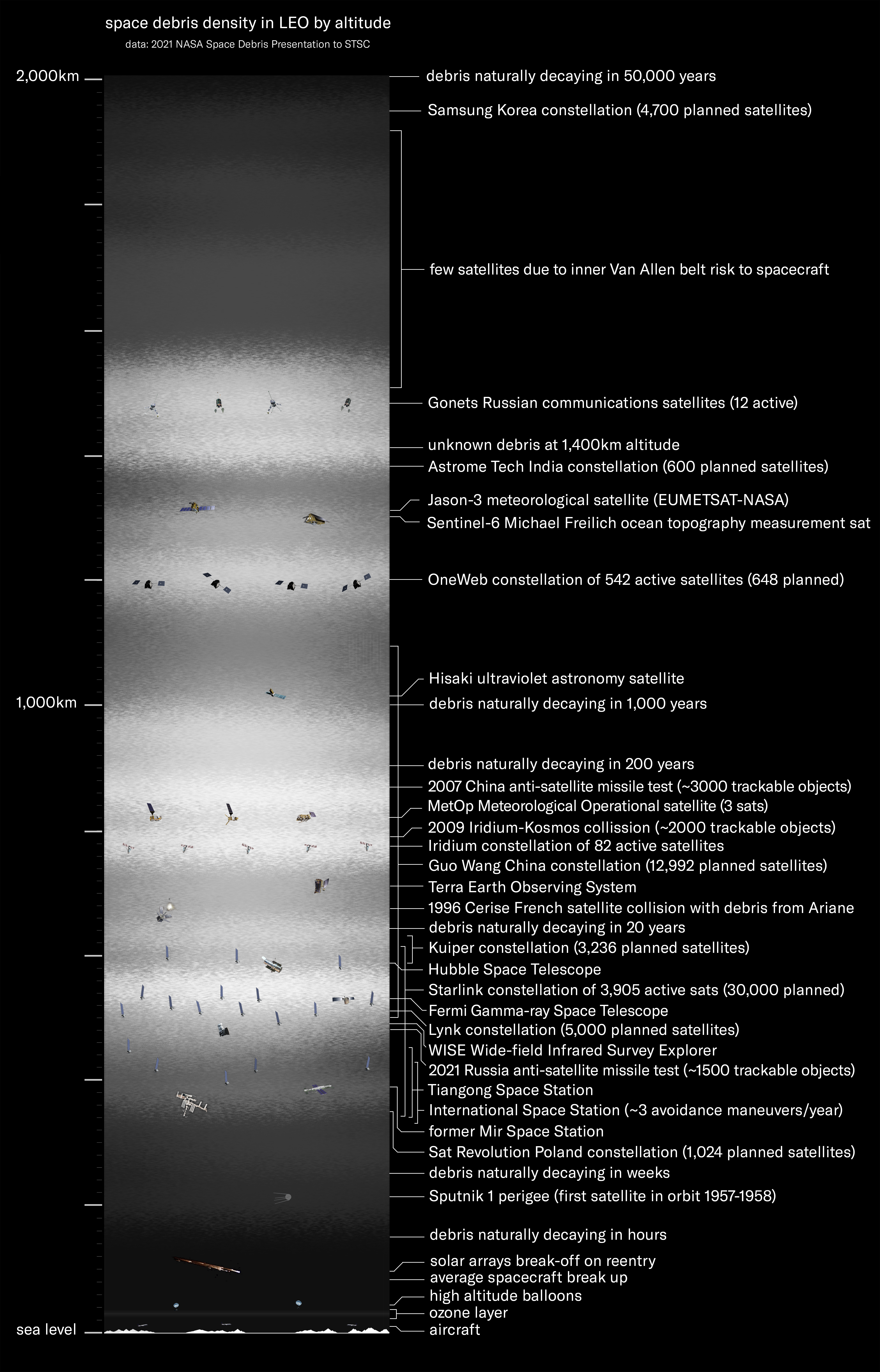
Debris density in low Earth orbit

In the orbits nearest to Earth – less than 2,000 km (1,200 mi) orbital altitude, referred to as low-Earth orbit (LEO) – there have traditionally been few "universal orbits" that keep a number of spacecraft in particular rings (in contrast to GEO, a single orbit that is widely used by over 500 satellites). There is currently 85% pollution in LEO (Low Earth Orbit). This was beginning to change in 2019, and several companies began to deploy the early phases of satellite internet constellations, which will have many universal orbits in LEO with 30 to 50 satellites per orbital plane and altitude. Traditionally, the most populated LEO orbits have been a number of Sun-synchronous satellites that keep a constant angle between the Sun and the orbital plane, making Earth observation easier with consistent sun angle and lighting. Sun-synchronous orbits are polar, meaning they cross over the polar regions. LEO satellites orbit in many planes, typically up to 15 times a day, causing frequent approaches between objects. The density of satellites – both active and derelict – is much higher in LEO.

Orbits are affected by gravitational perturbations (which in LEO include unevenness of the Earth's gravitational field due to variations in the density of the planet), and collisions can occur from any direction. The average impact speed of collisions in Low Earth Orbit is 10 km/s with maximums reaching above 14 km/s due to orbital eccentricity. The 2009 satellite collision occurred at a closing speed of 11.7 km/s (26,000 mph), creating over 2,000 large debris fragments. These debris cross many other orbits and increase debris collision risk.

It is theorized that a sufficiently large collision of spacecraft could potentially lead to a cascade effect, or even make some particular low Earth orbits effectively unusable for long term use by orbiting satellites, a phenomenon known as the Kessler syndrome. The theoretical effect is projected to be a theoretical runaway chain reaction of collisions that could occur, exponentially increasing the number and density of space debris in low-Earth orbit, and has been hypothesized to ensue beyond some critical density.

Crewed space missions are mostly at 400 km (250 mi) altitude and below, where air drag helps clear zones of fragments. The upper atmosphere is not a fixed density at any particular orbital altitude; it varies as a result of atmospheric tides and expands or contracts over longer time periods as a result of space weather. These longer-term effects can increase drag at lower altitudes; the 1990s expansion was a factor in reduced debris density. Another factor was fewer launches by Russia; the Soviet Union made most of their launches in the 1970s and 1980s.

=== Higher altitudes ===
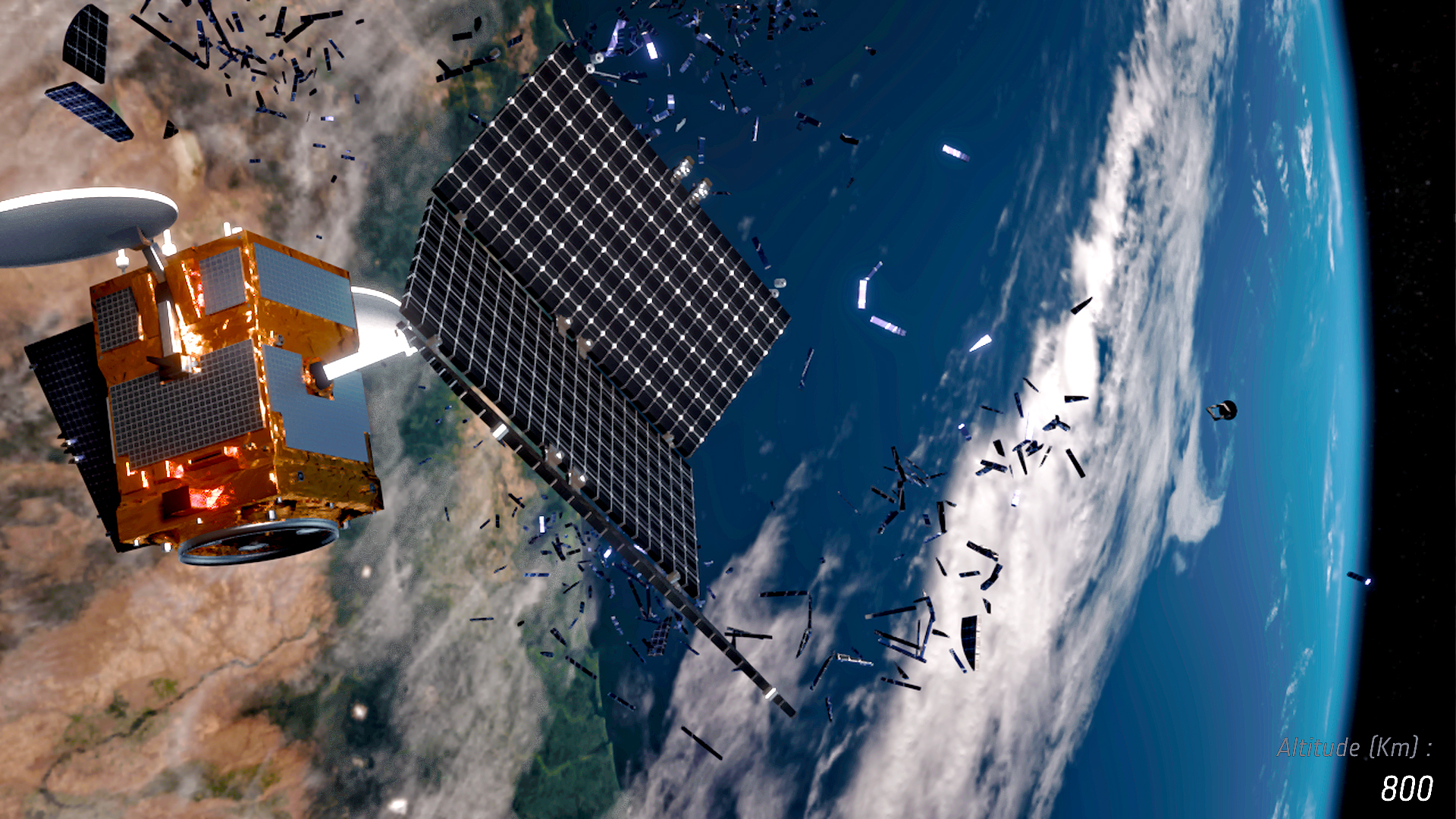
Illustration of a satellite breaking up into multiple pieces at higher altitudes

At higher altitudes, where air drag is less significant, orbital decay takes longer. Slight atmospheric drag, lunar perturbations, Earth's gravity perturbations, solar wind, and solar radiation pressure can gradually bring debris to lower altitudes (where it decays), but at very high altitudes this may take centuries. Although high-altitude orbits are less commonly used than LEO and the onset of the problem is slower, the numbers progress toward the critical threshold more quickly.

Many communications satellites are in geostationary orbits (GEO), clustering over specific targets and sharing the same orbital path. Although velocities are low between GEO objects, when a satellite becomes derelict (such as Telstar 401) it assumes a geosynchronous orbit; its orbital inclination increases about 0.8° and its speed increases about 160 km/h (99 mph) per year. Impact velocity peaks at about 1.5 km/s (0.93 mi/s). Orbital perturbations cause longitude drift of the inoperable spacecraft and precession of the orbital plane. Close approaches (within 50 meters) are estimated at one per year. The collision debris pose less short-term risk than from a LEO collision, but the satellite would likely become inoperable. Large objects, such as solar-power satellites, are especially vulnerable to collisions.

Although the ITU now requires proof a satellite can be moved out of its orbital slot at the end of its lifespan, studies suggest this is insufficient. Since GEO orbit is too distant to accurately measure objects under 1 m (3 ft 3 in), the nature of the problem is not well known. Satellites could be moved to empty spots in GEO, requiring less maneuvering and making it easier to predict future motion. Satellites or boosters in other orbits, especially stranded in geostationary transfer orbit, are an additional concern due to their typically high crossing velocity.

Despite efforts to reduce risk, spacecraft collisions have occurred. The European Space Agency telecom satellite Olympus-1 was struck by a meteoroid on 11 August 1993 and eventually moved to a graveyard orbit. On 29 March 2006, the Russian Express-AM11 communications satellite was struck by an unknown object and rendered inoperable; its engineers had enough contact time with the satellite to send it into a graveyard orbit.

== Sources ==
=== Dead spacecraft ===
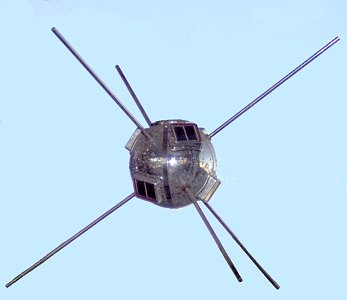
Vanguard 1 is expected to remain in orbit until at least the year 2250.

In 1958, the United States launched Vanguard I into a medium Earth orbit (MEO). As of October 2009, it, the upper stage of Vanguard 1's launch rocket and associated piece of debris, are the oldest surviving artificial space objects still in orbit and are expected to be until after the year 2250. As of May 2022, the Union of Concerned Scientists listed 5,465 operational satellites from a known population of 27,000 pieces of orbital debris tracked by NORAD.

Occasionally satellites are left in orbit when they are no longer useful. Many countries require that satellites go through passivation at the end of their life. The satellites are then either boosted into a higher, graveyard orbit or a lower, short-term orbit. Nonetheless, satellites that have been properly moved to a higher orbit have an eight-percent probability of puncture and coolant release over a 50-year period. The coolant freezes into droplets of solid sodium-potassium alloy, creating more debris.

Despite the use of passivation, or prior to its standardization, many satellites and rocket bodies have exploded or broken apart in orbit. In February 2015, for example, the USAF Defense Meteorological Satellite Program Flight 13 (DMSP-F13) exploded in orbit, creating at least 149 debris objects, which were expected to remain in orbit for decades. Later that same year, NOAA-16, which had been decommissioned after an anomaly in June 2014, broke apart in orbit into at least 275 pieces. For older programs, such as the Soviet-era Meteor 2 and Kosmos satellites, design flaws resulted in numerous break-ups – at least 68 by 1994 – following decommissioning, resulting in more debris.

=== Lost equipment ===
Space debris includes a glove lost by astronaut Ed White on the first American spacewalk (aka EVA), a camera lost by Michael Collins near Gemini 10, a thermal blanket lost during STS-88, garbage bags jettisoned by Soviet cosmonauts during Mir's 15-year life, a wrench, and a toothbrush. Sunita Williams of STS-116 lost a camera during an EVA. During an STS-120 EVA to reinforce a torn solar panel, a pair of pliers was lost, and in an STS-126 EVA, Heidemarie Stefanyshyn-Piper lost a briefcase-sized tool bag.

=== Fragmentations ===
An in-orbit fragmentation occurs when an artificial object in space unexpectedly breaks apart or sheds material outside its intended mission profile, serving as the primary generator of catalogued space debris. Historically, the majority of fragmentation events were caused by the sudden explosion of spent rocket upper stages and decommissioned satellites due to internal pressure build-ups or residual propellants. However, deliberate weapon testing and accidental hypervelocity impacts are also significant drivers of the orbital debris population.

==== Boosters ====
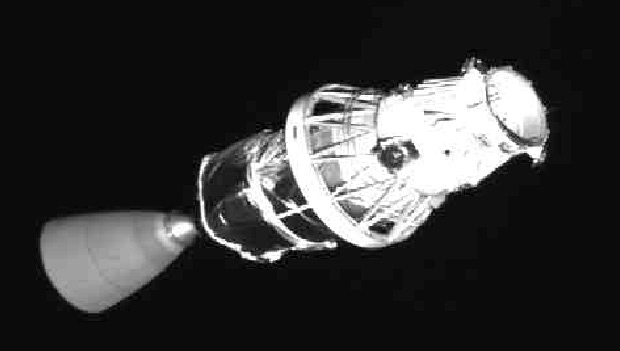
Spent upper stage of a Delta II rocket, photographed by the XSS 10 satellite

A significant portion of debris is due to rocket upper stages (e.g. the Inertial Upper Stage) breaking up due to decomposition of unvented fuel. The first such instance involved the launch of the Transit-4a satellite in 1961. Two hours after insertion into orbit, the Ablestar upper stage exploded. Even boosters that do not break apart can be a problem. A major known impact event involved an intact Ariane booster.

Although NASA and the United States Air Force now require upper-stage passivation, other launchers – such as the Chinese and Russian space agencies – do not. Lower stages, like the Space Shuttle's solid rocket boosters or the Apollo program's Saturn IB launch vehicles, do not reach orbit.

Examples:

- Two Japanese H-2A rockets broke up in 2006.
- A Russian Briz-M booster stage exploded in orbit over South Australia on 19 February 2007. Launched on 28 February 2006 carrying an Arabsat-4A communications satellite, it malfunctioned before it could use up its propellant. Although the explosion was captured on film by astronomers, due to the orbit path the debris cloud has been difficult to measure with radar. By 21 February 2007, over 1,000 fragments were identified. A 14 February 2007 breakup was recorded by Celestrak.
- Another Briz-M broke up on 16 October 2012 after a failed 6 August Proton-M launch. The amount and size of the debris was unknown.
- The second stage of the Zenit-2, called the SL-16 by western governments, along with the second stages of the Vostok and Kosmos launch vehicles, make up about 20% of the total mass of launch debris in Low Earth Orbit (LEO). An analysis that determined the 50 "statistically most concerning" debris objects in low Earth orbit determined that the top 20 were all Zenit-2 upper stages.
- A Delta II rocket used to launch NASA's 1989 COBE spacecraft exploded on December 3, 2006. This occurred even though its residual fuel had already been vented to space.
- In 2018–2019, three different Atlas V Centaur second stages broke up.
- In December 2020, scientists confirmed that a previously detected near-Earth object, 2020 SO, was rocket booster space junk launched in 1966 orbiting Earth and the Sun.
- At least eight Delta rockets have contributed orbital debris in the Sun-synchronous low Earth orbit environment. The variant of the Delta upper stage that was used in the 1970s was found to be prone to in-orbit explosions. Starting in 1981, depletion burns – to get rid of excess propellant – became standard and no Delta Rocket Bodies launched after 1981 experienced severe fragmentations afterward, but some of those launched prior to 1981 continued to explode. In 1991, the Delta 1975-052B fragmented, 16 years after launch, demonstrating the resilience of the propellent.

==== Weapons ====
In addition to the accidental creation of debris, some has been made intentionally through the deliberate destruction of satellites. This has been done as a test of anti-satellite or anti-ballistic missile technology, or to prevent a sensitive satellite from being examined by a foreign power. The United States has conducted over 30 anti-satellite weapons tests (ASATs), the Soviet Union/Russia has performed at least 27, China has performed 10 and India has performed at least one. The most recent ASATs were the Chinese interception of FY-1C, Russian trials of its PL-19 Nudol, the American interception of USA-193 and India's interception of an unstated live satellite.

A former source of debris was anti-satellite weapons (ASATs) testing by the US and Soviet Union during the 1960s and 1970s. North American Aerospace Defense Command (NORAD) only collected data for Soviet tests, and debris from US tests were identified subsequently. By the time the debris problem was understood, widespread ASAT testing had ended. The US Program 437 was shut down in 1975.

The US restarted their ASAT programs in the 1980s with the Vought ASM-135 ASAT. A 1985 test destroyed a 1-tonne (2,200 lb) satellite orbiting at 525 km (326 mi), creating thousands of pieces of debris larger than 1 cm (0.39 in). At this altitude, atmospheric drag decayed the orbit of most of the debris within a decade. A de facto moratorium followed the test.

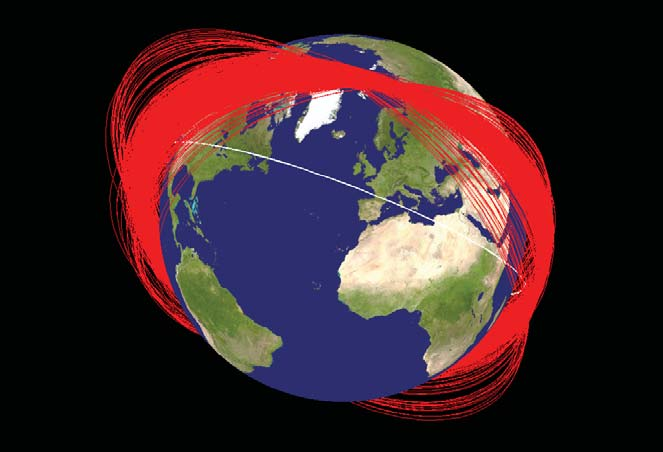
Known orbit planes of Fengyun-1C debris one month after the weather satellite's disintegration by the Chinese ASAT

China's government was condemned for the military implications and the amount of debris from a 2007 anti-satellite missile test, the largest single space debris incident in history (creating over 2,300 pieces golf-ball size or larger, over 35,000 1 cm (0.4 in) or larger, and one million pieces 1 mm (0.04 in) or larger). The target satellite orbited between 850 km (530 mi) and 882 km (548 mi), the portion of near-Earth space most densely populated with satellites. Since atmospheric drag is low at that altitude, the debris is slow to return to Earth, and in June 2007 NASA's Terra environmental spacecraft maneuvered to avoid impact from the debris. Brian Weeden, a US Air Force officer and Secure World Foundation staff member, noted that the 2007 Chinese satellite explosion created more than 3,000 separate objects of orbital debris that then required tracking.

On 20 February 2008, the US launched an SM-3 missile from the USS Lake Erie to destroy a defective US spy satellite thought to be carrying 450 kg (1,000 lb) of toxic hydrazine propellant. The event occurred at about 250 km (155 mi). The missile was aimed to minimize the amount of debris, which (according to Pentagon Strategic Command chief Kevin Chilton) had decayed by early 2009.

On 27 March 2019, Indian Prime Minister Narendra Modi announced that India shot down one of its own LEO satellites with a ground-based missile. He stated that the operation, part of Mission Shakti, would defend the country's interests in space. Afterwards, US Air Force Space Command announced they were tracking 270 new pieces of debris but expected the number to grow as data collection continues.

On 15 November 2021, the Russian Defense Ministry destroyed Kosmos 1408 orbiting at around 450 km, creating "more than 1,500 pieces of trackable debris and hundreds of thousands of pieces of un-trackable debris" according to the US State Department.

== Hazards ==
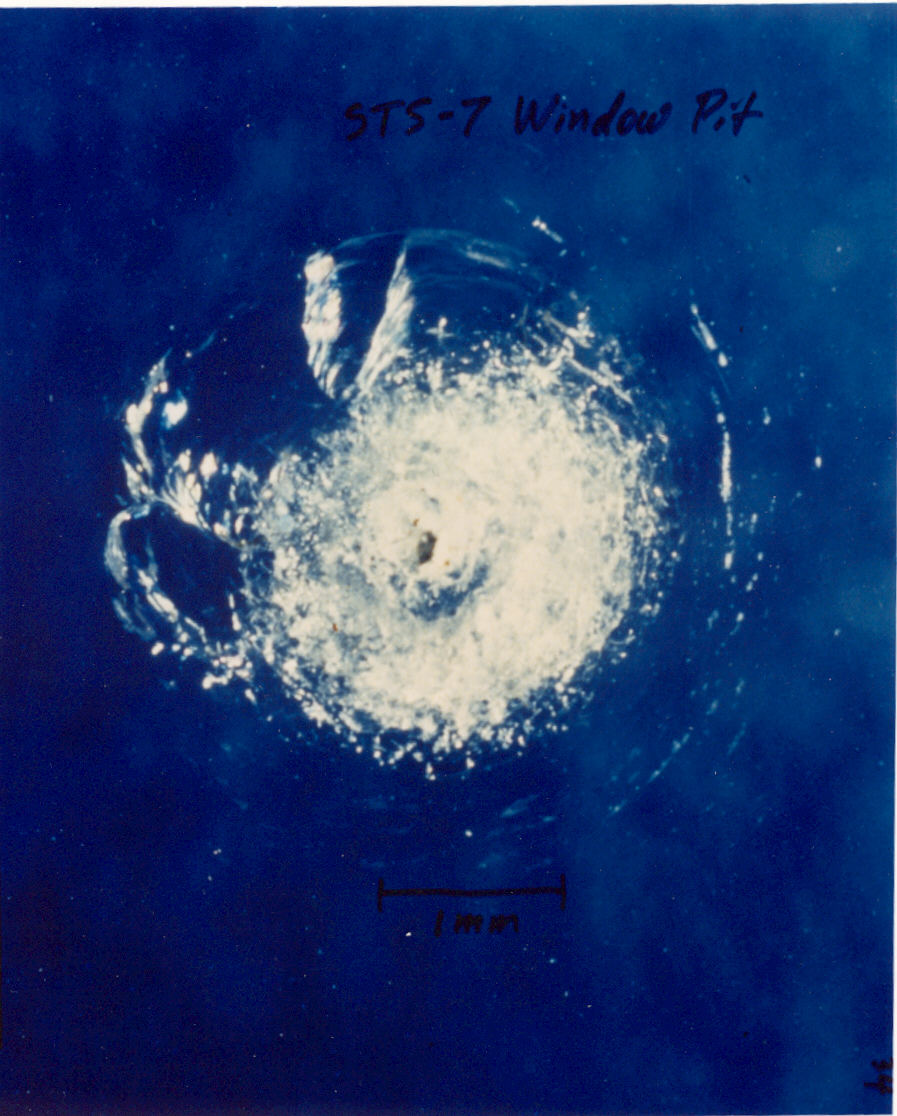
A micrometeoroid left this crater on the surface of Space Shuttle Challenger's front window on STS-7.

=== To spacecraft ===
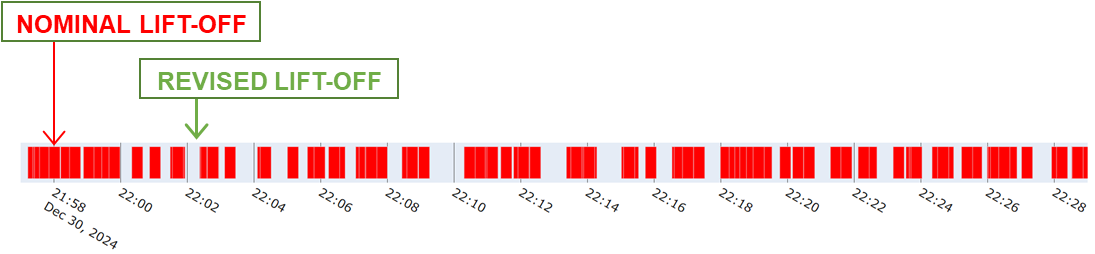
Collision on Launch Avoidance lead to delayed spacecraft launches to avoid potential conjunctions/collisions during launch. Seen here is a Collision Avoidance analysis that mandated a four-minute delay for the launch of SPADEX in 2024.

Space junk can be a hazard to active satellites and spacecraft. It has been suggested that Earth orbit could even become impassable if the risk of collision becomes too great, a phenomenon known as Kessler syndrome.

However, since the risk to spacecraft increases with exposure to high debris densities, it is more accurate to say that LEO would be rendered unusable by orbiting craft. The threat to craft passing through LEO to reach a higher orbit would be much lower owing to the short time span of the crossing.

==== Uncrewed spacecraft ====
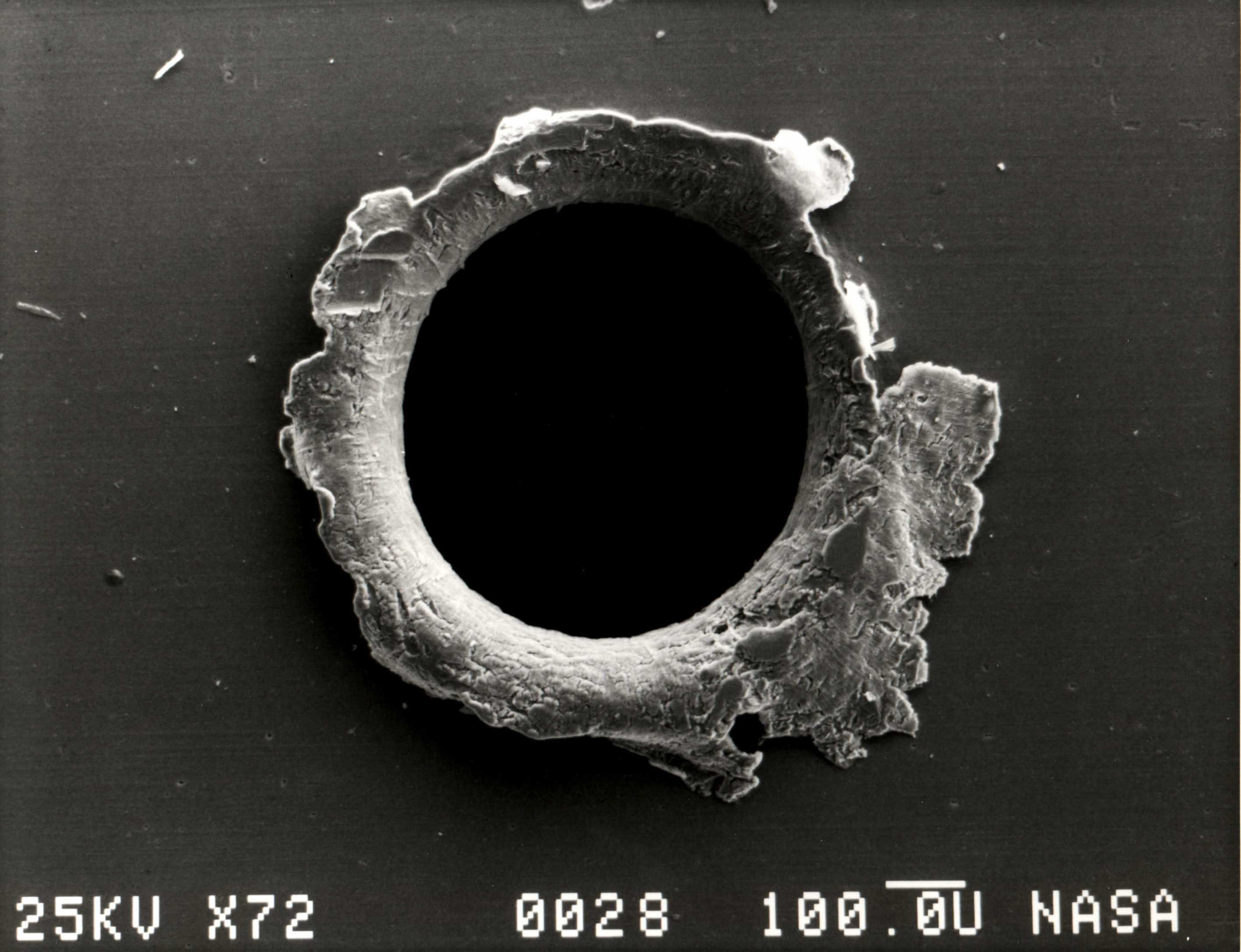
View of an orbital debris hole made in the panel of the Solar Max satellite

Although spacecraft are typically protected by Whipple shields, solar panels, which are exposed to the Sun, wear from low-mass impacts. Even small impacts can produce a cloud of plasma which is an electrical risk to the panels.

Satellites are believed to have been destroyed by micrometeorites and small orbital debris (MMOD). The earliest suspected loss was of Kosmos 1275, which disappeared on 24 July 1981, a month after launch. Kosmos contained no volatile fuel, therefore, there appeared to be nothing internal to the satellite which could have caused the destructive explosion. However, the case has not been proven and another hypothesis forwarded is that the battery exploded. Tracking showed it broke into 300 objects.

Many impacts have been confirmed since. For example, on 24 July 1996, the French microsatellite Cerise was hit by fragments of an Ariane 1 H-10 upper-stage booster which exploded in November 1986. On 29 March 2006, the Russian Ekspress-AM11 communications satellite was struck by an unknown object and rendered inoperable. On 13 October 2009, Terra suffered a single battery cell failure anomaly and a battery heater control anomaly which were subsequently considered likely the result of an MMOD strike. On 12 March 2010, Aura lost power from one-half of one of its 11 solar panels which was attributed to an MMOD strike. On 22 May 2013, GOES 13 was hit by an MMOD which caused it to lose track of the stars that it used to maintain an operational attitude. It took nearly a month for the spacecraft to return to operation.

The first major satellite collision occurred on 10 February 2009. The 950 kg (2,090 lb) derelict satellite Kosmos 2251 and the operational 560 kg (1,230 lb) Iridium 33 collided, 500 mi (800 km) over northern Siberia. The relative speed of impact was about 11.7 km/s (7.3 mi/s), or about 42,120 km/h (26,170 mph). Both satellites were destroyed, creating thousands of pieces of new smaller debris, with legal and political liability issues unresolved even years later.

On 22 January 2013, BLITS (a Russian laser-ranging satellite) was struck by debris suspected to be from the 2007 Chinese anti-satellite missile test, changing both its orbit and rotation rate.

Satellites sometimes perform Collision Avoidance Maneuvers and satellite operators may monitor space debris as part of maneuver planning. For example, in January 2017, the European Space Agency altered the orbit of one of its three Swarm mission spacecraft, based on data from the US Joint Space Operations Center, to lower the risk of collision from Cosmos-375, a derelict Russian satellite.

==== Crewed spacecraft ====
Crewed flights are particularly vulnerable to space debris conjunctions in the orbital path of the spacecraft. Occasional avoidance maneuvers or longer-term space debris wear have affected the Space Shuttle, the MIR space station, and the International Space Station.

===== Space Shuttle missions =====
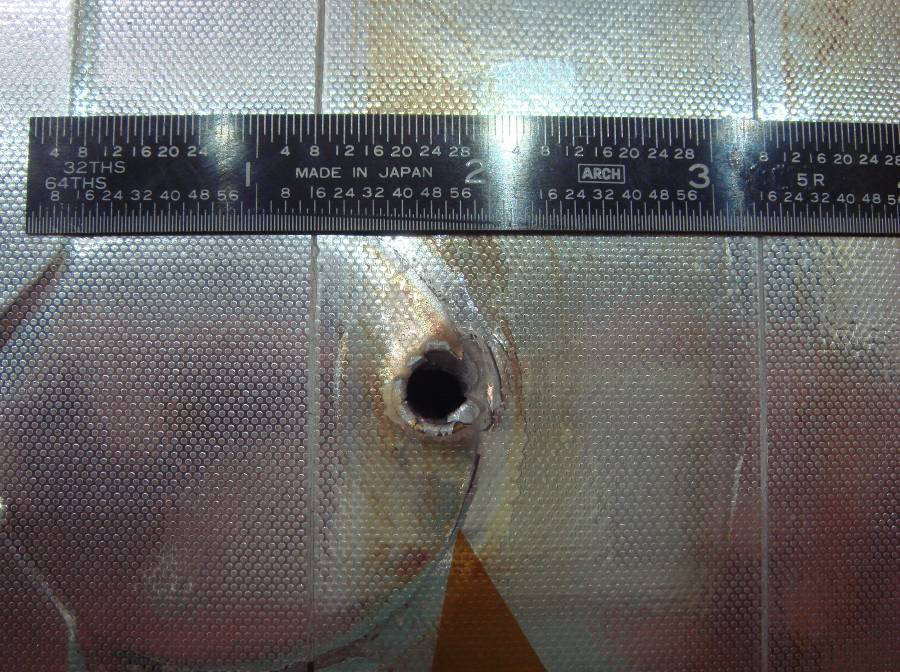
Space Shuttle Endeavour had a major impact on its radiator during STS-118. The entry hole is about 5.5 mm (0.22 in), and the exit hole is twice as large.

From the early shuttle missions, NASA used NORAD space monitoring capabilities to assess the shuttle's orbital path for debris. In the 1980s, this consumed a large proportion of NORAD capacity. The first collision-avoidance maneuver occurred during STS-48, in September 1991; a seven-second thruster burn to avoid debris from the derelict satellite Kosmos 955. Similar maneuvers were executed on missions 53, 72 and 82.

One of the earliest events to publicize the debris problem occurred on Space Shuttle Challenger's second flight, STS-7. A fleck of paint struck its front window, creating a pit over 1 mm (0.04 in) wide. On STS-59 in 1994, Endeavour's front window was pitted about half its depth. Minor debris impacts increased from 1998.

Window chipping and minor damage to thermal protection system tiles (TPS) were already common by the 1990s. The Shuttle was later flown tail-first to take a greater proportion of the debris load on the engines and rear cargo bay, which are not used in orbit or during descent, and thus are less critical for post-launch operation. When flying attached to the ISS, a shuttle was flipped around so the better-armoured station shielded the orbiter.

A NASA 2005 study concluded that debris accounted for approximately half of the overall risk to the Shuttle. An executive-level decision to proceed was required if the catastrophic impact was more likely than 1 in 200. On a normal (low-orbit) mission to the ISS, the risk was approximately 1 in 300, but the Hubble telescope repair mission was flown at the higher orbital altitude of 560 km (350 mi) where the risk was initially calculated at a 1-in-185 (due in part to the 2009 satellite collision). A re-analysis with better debris numbers reduced the estimated risk to 1 in 221, and the mission went ahead.

Debris incidents continued on later Shuttle missions. During STS-115 in 2006, a fragment of circuit board bored a small hole through the radiator panels in the US space shuttle Atlantis cargo bay. On STS-118 in 2007, debris blew a bullet-like hole through the US space shuttle Endeavour radiator panel.

===== Mir =====
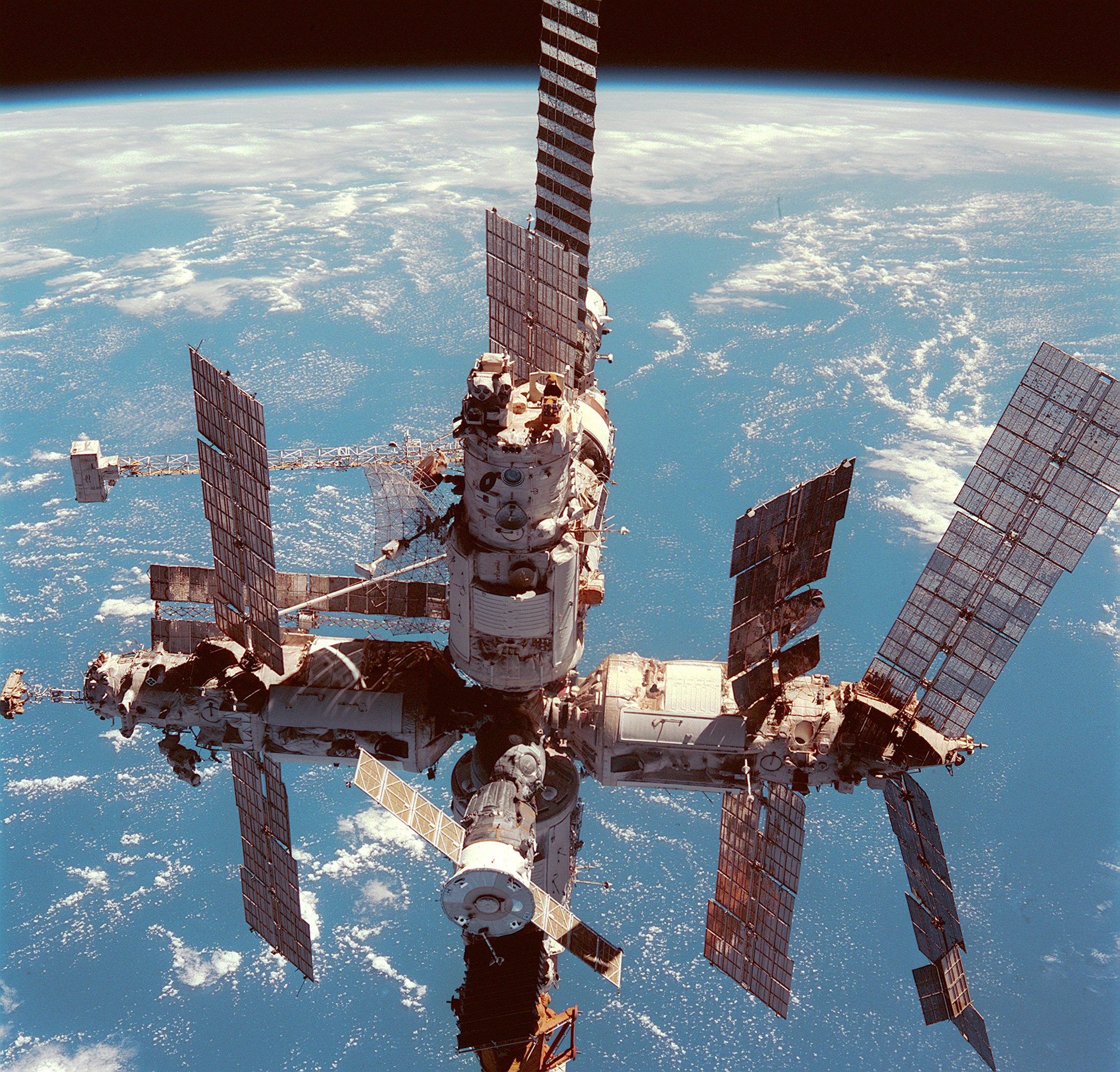
Debris impacts on Mir's solar panels degraded their performance. The damage is most noticeable on the panel on the right, which is facing the camera with a high degree of contrast. Extensive damage to the smaller panel below is due to impact with a Progress spacecraft rather than space debris.

Impact wear was notable on the Soviet space station Mir, since it remained in space for long periods with its original solar module panels.

===== International Space Station =====
The ISS also uses Whipple shielding to protect its interior from minor debris. However, exterior portions (notably its solar panels) cannot be protected easily. In 1999, the ISS panels were predicted to degrade approximately 0.23% in four years due to the "sandblasting" effect of impacts with small orbital debris. An avoidance maneuver is typically performed for the ISS if "there is a greater than a one-in-10,000 chance of a debris strike". As of January 2014, there have been sixteen maneuvers in the fifteen years the ISS had been in orbit. By 2019, over 1,400 meteoroid and orbital debris (MMOD) impacts had been recorded on the ISS.

As another method to reduce the risk to humans on board, ISS operational management asked the crew to shelter in the Soyuz on three occasions due to late debris-proximity warnings. In addition to the sixteen thruster firings and three Soyuz-capsule shelter orders, one attempted maneuver was not completed due to not having the several days' warning necessary to upload the maneuver timeline to the station's computer. A March 2009 event involved debris believed to be a 10 cm (3.9 in) piece of the Kosmos 1275 satellite. In 2013, the ISS operations management did not make a maneuver to avoid any debris, after making a record four debris maneuvers the previous year.

==== Kessler syndrome ====
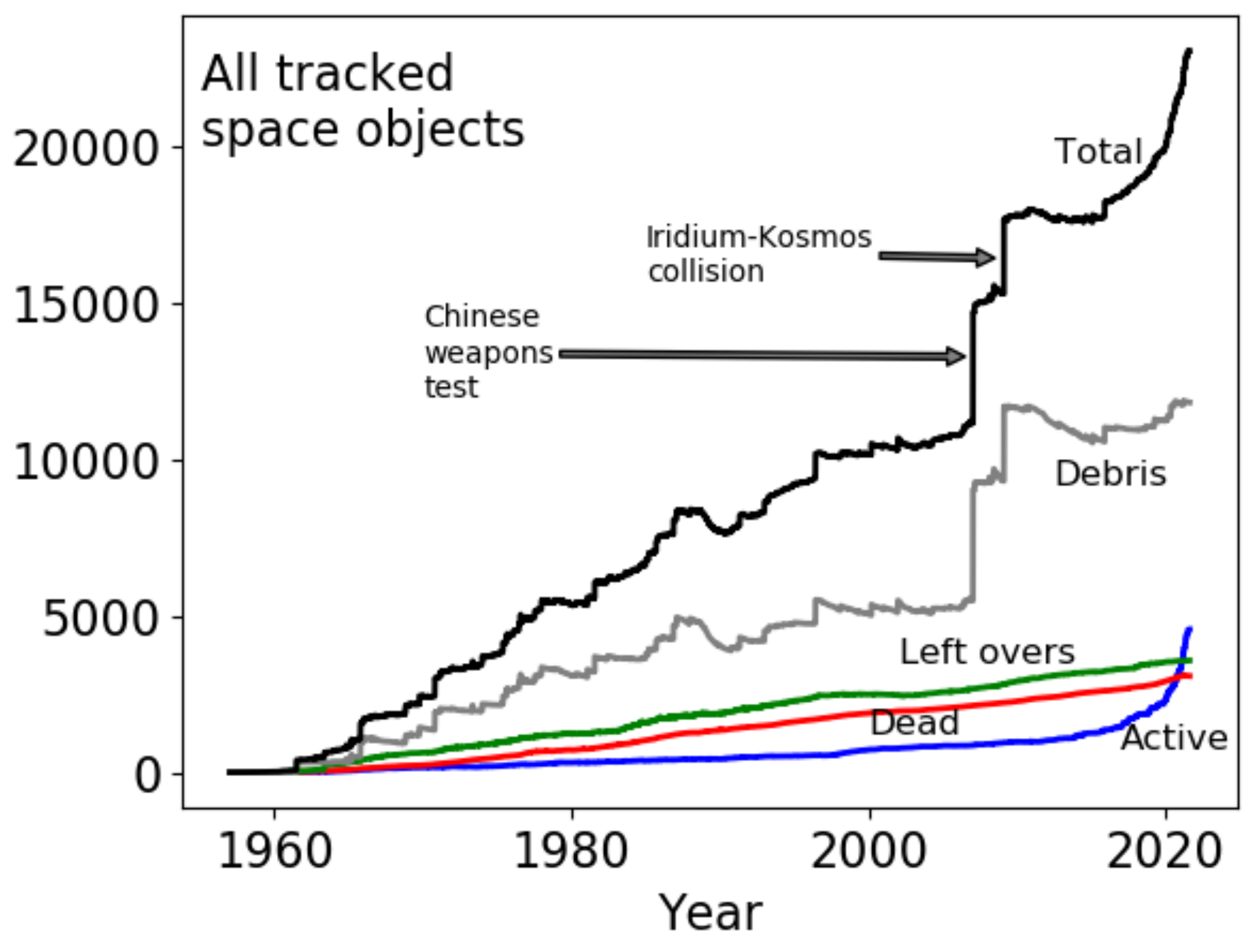
Growth of tracked objects in orbit and related events; efforts to manage outer space global commons have so far not reduced the total amount of debris or the growth of objects in orbit.

The Kessler syndrome, proposed by NASA scientist Donald J. Kessler in 1978, is a theoretical scenario in which the density of objects in low Earth orbit (LEO) is high enough that collisions between objects could cause a cascade effect where each collision generates space debris that increases the likelihood of further collisions. He further theorized that one implication, if this were to occur, is that the distribution of debris in orbit could render space activities and the use of satellites in specific orbital ranges economically impractical for many generations.

The growth in the number of objects as a result of the late-1990s studies sparked debate in the space community on the nature of the problem and the earlier dire warnings. According to Kessler's 1991 derivation and 2001 updates, the LEO environment in the 1,000 km (620 mi) altitude range should be cascading. However, only one major satellite collision incident occurred: the 2009 satellite collision between Iridium 33 and Kosmos 2251. The lack of obvious short-term cascading has led to speculation that the original estimates overstated the problem. According to Kessler in 2010, however, a cascade may not be obvious until it is well advanced, which might take years.

=== On Earth ===
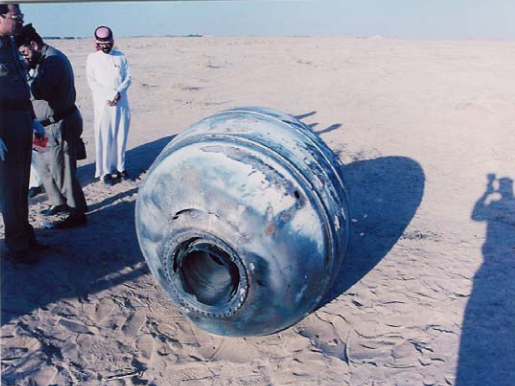
Saudi officials inspect a crashed PAM-D module in January 2001.

Most debris burns up in the atmosphere, or splashes into the ocean. About 1 ton of debris reaches earth per week, as of 2026. In 2025, the U.S. Space Force issued alerts for nearly 820 objects entering the atmosphere. This was up from 110 objects in 2015. Experts expect these numbers will increase along with the number of rocket launches: 2025 had 300 launches while 2015 had less than 100.

There is only one documented case of a person being hit by debris, a piece of a Delta II rocket fuel tank struck a woman who survived uninjured. Debris burning up in the atmosphere contributes to air pollution. United Nations treaties, last updated in 2007 and non-binding, govern liability for space debris that hurts people or damages property.

== Tracking and measurement ==
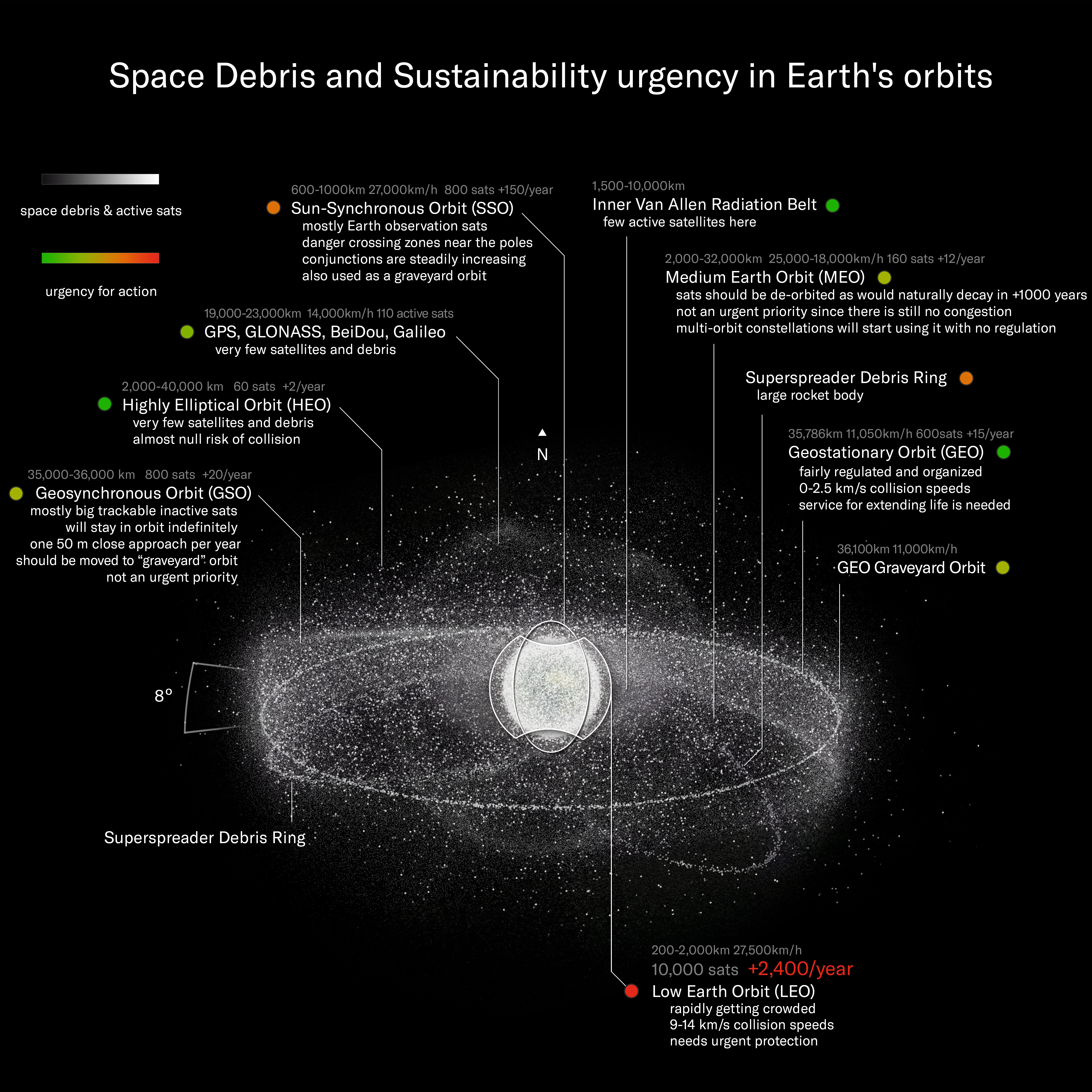
Infographic showing the space debris situation in different kinds of orbits around Earth

=== Tracking from the ground ===
Radar and optical detectors such as lidar are the main tools for tracking space debris. Although objects under 10 cm (4 in) have reduced orbital stability, debris as small as 1 cm can be tracked, however determining orbits to allow re-acquisition is difficult. Most debris remain unobserved. The NASA Orbital Debris Observatory tracked space debris with a 3 m (10 ft) liquid mirror transit telescope. FM Radio waves can detect debris, after reflecting off them onto a receiver. Optical tracking may be a useful early-warning system on spacecraft.

The US Strategic Command keeps a catalog of known orbital objects, using ground-based radar and telescopes, and a space-based telescope (originally to distinguish from hostile missiles). The 2009 edition listed about 19,000 objects. Other data come from the ESA Space Debris Telescope, TIRA, the Goldstone, Haystack, and EISCAT radars and the Cobra Dane phased array radar, to be used in debris-environment models like the ESA Meteoroid and Space Debris Terrestrial Environment Reference (MASTER).

=== Measurement in space ===
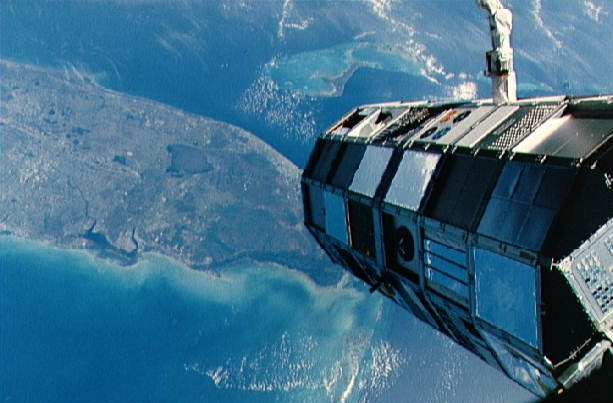
The Long Duration Exposure Facility (LDEF) is an important source of information on small-particle space debris.

Returned space hardware is a valuable source of information on the directional distribution and composition of the (sub-millimetre) debris flux. The LDEF satellite deployed by mission STS-41-C Challenger and retrieved by STS-32 Columbia spent 68 months in orbit to gather debris data. The EURECA satellite, deployed by STS-46 Atlantis in 1992 and retrieved by STS-57 Endeavour in 1993, was also used for debris study.

The solar arrays of the Hubble space telescope were returned by missions STS-61 Endeavour and STS-109 Columbia, and the impact craters were studied by the ESA to validate its models. Materials returned from Mir were also studied, notably the Mir Environmental Effects Payload (which also tested materials intended for the ISS).

=== Gabbard diagrams ===
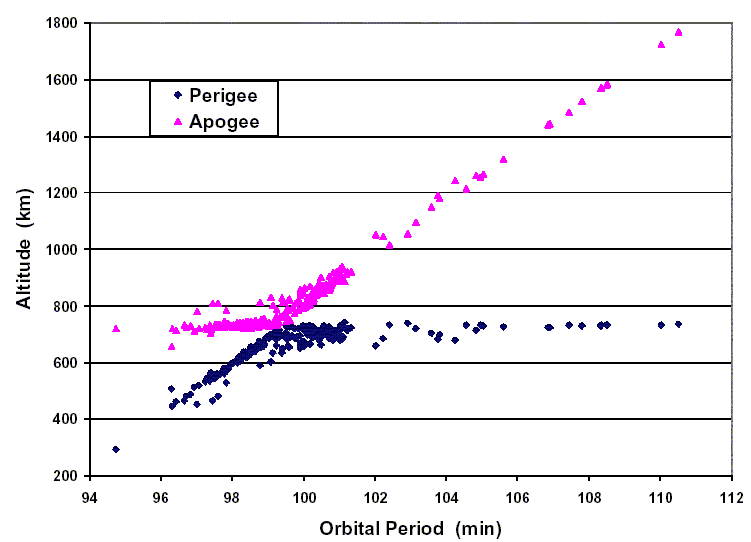
Gabbard diagram of debris from the disintegration of the third stage of a Chinese Long March 4 booster

A debris cloud resulting from a single event is studied with scatter plots known as Gabbard diagrams, where the perigee and apogee of fragments are plotted with respect to their orbital period. Gabbard diagrams of the early debris cloud prior to the effects of perturbations, if the data were available, are reconstructed. They often include data on newly observed, as yet uncatalogued fragments. Gabbard diagrams can provide insights into the features of the fragmentation, the direction and point of impact.

== Dealing with debris ==
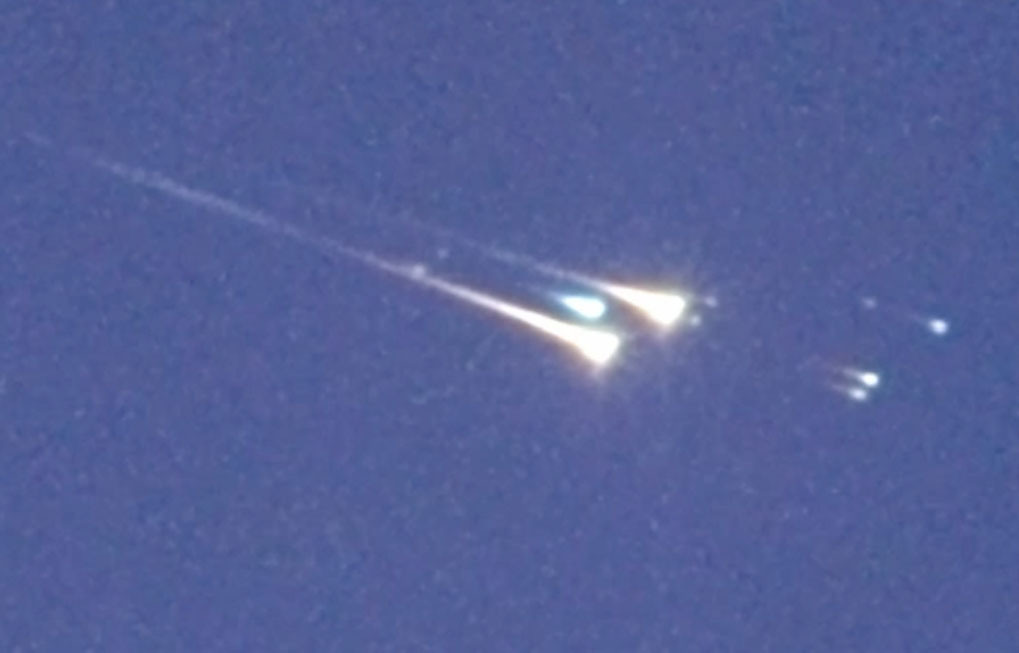
Space debris identified as WT1190F, burning up in a fireball over Sri Lanka

An average of about one tracked object per day has been dropping out of orbit for the past 50 years, averaging almost three objects per day at solar maximum (due to the heating and expansion of the Earth's atmosphere creating more drag), but one about every three days at solar minimum, usually five and a half years later. In addition to natural atmospheric effects, corporations, academics and government agencies have proposed plans and technology to deal with space debris, but as of November 2014, most of these are theoretical, and there is no business plan for debris reduction.

A number of scholars have also observed that institutional factors – political, legal, economic, and cultural "rules of the game" – are the greatest impediment to the cleanup of near-Earth space. There is little commercial incentive to act, since costs are not assigned to polluters, though a number of technological solutions have been suggested. However, effects to date are limited. In the US, governmental bodies have been accused of backsliding on previous commitments to limit debris growth, "let alone tackling the more complex issues of removing orbital debris." The different methods for removal of space debris have been evaluated by the Space Generation Advisory Council, including French astrophysicist Fatoumata Kébé.

In May 2024, a NASA report from the Office of Technology, Policy, and Strategy introduced new methods for addressing orbital debris. The report, titled Cost and Benefit Analysis of Mitigating, Tracking, and Remediating Orbital Debris, provided a comprehensive analysis comparing the cost-effectiveness of over ten different actions, including shielding spacecraft, tracking smaller debris, and removing large debris. By evaluating these measures in economic terms, the study aims to inform cost-effective strategies for debris management, highlighting that methods like rapid deorbiting of defunct spacecraft can significantly reduce risks in space.

=== Modelling ===
Numerical and mathematical models are used to describe the evolution of the orbital debris environment and to evaluate the effectiveness of mitigation measures. Depending on their purpose, models may estimate the debris flux encountered by spacecraft, simulate the long-term evolution of the orbital population, or reproduce the behaviour of individual objects and fragmentation events. They are widely used by space agencies and research institutions to assess future debris scenarios, compare mitigation strategies and support the development of space sustainability policies.

Modern debris models combine observational catalogues, orbital propagation, collision probability estimation, fragmentation models and projected launch traffic to forecast the long-term evolution of the space environment.

=== Regulation ===
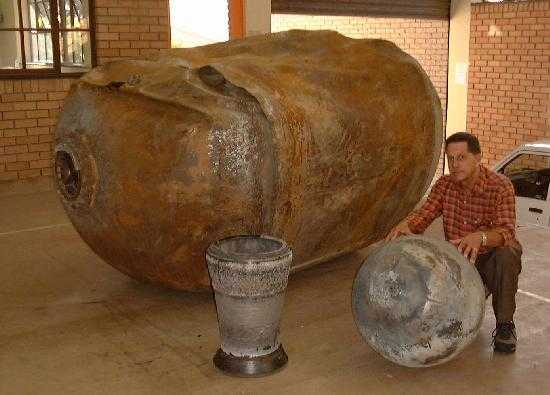
After reentry, Delta 2 second stage pieces were found in South Africa.

There is no international treaty minimizing space debris. However, the United Nations Committee on the Peaceful Uses of Outer Space (COPUOS) published voluntary guidelines in 2007, using a variety of earlier national regulatory attempts at developing standards for debris mitigation. As of 2008, the committee was discussing international "rules of the road" to prevent collisions between satellites. By 2013, a number of national legal regimes existed, typically instantiated in the launch licenses that are required for a launch in all spacefaring nations.

The US issued a set of standard practices for civilian (NASA) and military (DoD and USAF) orbital-debris mitigation in 2001. The standard envisioned disposal for final mission orbits in one of three ways: 1) atmospheric reentry where even with "conservative projections for solar activity, atmospheric drag will limit the lifetime to no longer than 25 years after completion of mission;" 2) maneuver to a "storage orbit:" move the spacecraft to one of four very broad parking orbit ranges (2,000–19,700 km (1,200–12,200 mi), 20,700–35,300 km (12,900–21,900 mi), above 36,100 km (22,400 mi), or out of Earth orbit completely and into any heliocentric orbit; 3) "Direct retrieval: Retrieve the structure and remove it from orbit as soon as practicable after completion of mission." The standard articulated in option 1, which is the standard applicable to most satellites and derelict upper stages, has come to be known as the "25-year rule". The US updated the Orbital Debris Mitigation Standard Practices in December 2019, but made no change to the 25-year rule even though "[m]any in the space community believe that the timeframe should be less than 25 years." There is no consensus however on what any new timeframe might be.

In 2002, the European Space Agency (ESA) worked with an international group to promulgate a similar set of standards, also with a "25-year rule" applying to most Earth-orbit satellites and upper stages. Space agencies in Europe began to develop technical guidelines in the mid-1990s, and ASI, UKSA, CNES, DLR and ESA signed a "European Code of Conduct" in 2006, which was a predecessor standard to the ISO international standard work that would begin the following year. In 2008, ESA further developed "its own "Requirements on Space Debris Mitigation for Agency Projects" which "came into force on 1 April 2008."

Germany and France have posted bonds to safeguard property from debris damage. The "direct retrieval" option (option no. 3 in the US "standard practices" above) has rarely been done by any spacefaring nation (exception, USAF X-37) or commercial actor since the earliest days of spaceflight due to the cost and complexity of achieving direct retrieval, but the ESA has scheduled a 2026 demonstration mission (ClearSpace-1) to do this with a single small 94 kg (207 lb) satellite (PROBA-1) at a projected cost of €120 million not including the launch costs.

By 2006, the Indian Space Research Organization (ISRO) had developed a number of technical means of debris mitigation (upper stage passivation, propellant reserves for movement to graveyard orbits, etc.) for ISRO launch vehicles and satellites, and was actively contributing to inter-agency debris coordination and the efforts of the UN COPUOS committee.

In 2007, the ISO began preparing an international standard for space-debris mitigation. By 2010, ISO had published "a comprehensive set of space system engineering standards aimed at mitigating space debris. [with primary requirements] defined in the top-level standard, ISO 24113." By 2017, the standards were nearly complete. However, these standards are not binding on any party by ISO or any international jurisdiction. They are simply available for use in voluntary ways. They "can be adopted voluntarily by a spacecraft manufacturer or operator, or brought into effect through a commercial contract between a customer and supplier, or used as the basis for establishing a set of national regulations on space debris mitigation."

A computer-generated animation by the European Space Agency representing space debris in low earth orbit at the current rate of growth compared to mitigation measures being taken

The voluntary ISO standard also adopted the "25-year rule" for the "LEO protected region" below 2,000 km (1,200 mi) altitude that has been previously (and still is, as of 2019) used by the US, ESA, and UN mitigation standards, and identifies it as "an upper limit for the amount of time that a space system shall remain in orbit after its mission is completed. Ideally, the time to deorbit should be as short as possible (i.e., much shorter than 25 years)".

Holger Krag of the ESA states that as of 2017 there is no binding international regulatory framework with no progress occurring at the respective UN body in Vienna.

=== Growth mitigation ===
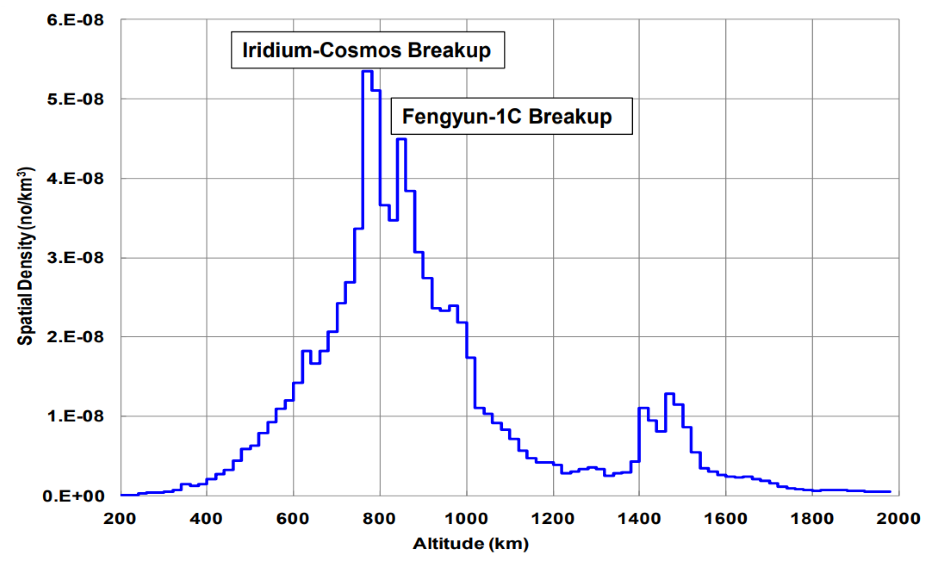
Spatial density of LEO space debris by altitude, according to 2011 a NASA report to the United Nations Office for Outer Space Affairs

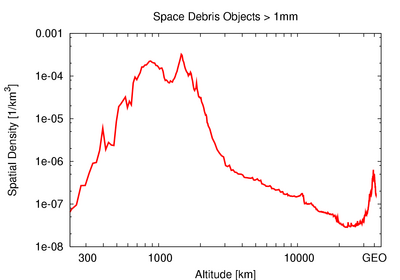
Spatial density of space debris by altitude according to ESA MASTER-2001, without debris from the Chinese ASAT and 2009 collision events

As of the 2010s, several technical approaches to the mitigation of the growth of space debris are typically undertaken, yet no comprehensive system is in place to reduce debris.

International mitigation guidance has been published to reduce the creation of new debris, including recommendations to minimize debris released during normal operations, prevent on-orbit breakups, and perform post-mission disposal and collision-avoidance planning. NASA has also published detailed engineering guidance for limiting orbital debris as part of its technical standards documentation.

To avoid excessive creation of artificial space debris, many – but not all – satellites launched to above-low-Earth-orbit are launched initially into elliptical orbits with perigees inside Earth's atmosphere so the orbit will quickly decay and the satellites then will be destroyed upon reentry into the atmosphere. Other methods are used for spacecraft in higher orbits. These include passivation of the spacecraft at the end of its useful life; as well as the use of upper stages that can reignite to decelerate the stage to intentionally deorbit it, often on the first or second orbit following payload release; satellites that can, if they remain healthy for years, deorbit themselves from the lower orbits around Earth. Other satellites (such as many CubeSats) in low orbits below approximately 400 km (250 mi) orbital altitude depend on the energy-absorbing effects of the upper atmosphere to reliably deorbit a spacecraft within weeks or months.

Increasingly, spent upper stages in higher orbits – orbits for which low-delta-v deorbit is not possible, or not planned for – and architectures that support satellite passivation, are passivated at end of life. This removes any internal energy contained in the vehicle at the end of its mission or useful life. While this does not remove the debris of the now derelict rocket stage or satellite itself, it does substantially reduce the likelihood of the spacecraft destructing and creating many smaller pieces of space debris, a phenomenon that was common in many of the early generations of US and Soviet spacecraft.

Upper stage passivation (e.g. of Delta boosters) achieved by releasing residual propellants reduces debris from orbital explosions; however even as late as 2011, not all upper stages implement this practice. SpaceX used the term "propulsive passivation" for the final maneuver of their six-hour demonstration mission (STP-2) of the Falcon 9 second stage for the US Air Force in 2019, but did not define what all that term encompassed.

With a "one-up, one-down" launch-license policy for Earth orbits, launchers would rendezvous with, capture, and de-orbit a derelict satellite from approximately the same orbital plane. Another possibility is the robotic refueling of satellites. Experiments have been flown by NASA, and SpaceX is developing large-scale on-orbit propellant transfer technology.

Another approach to debris mitigation is to explicitly design the mission architecture to leave the rocket second-stage in an elliptical geocentric orbit with a low-perigee, thus ensuring rapid orbital decay and avoiding long-term orbital debris from spent rocket bodies. Such missions will often complete the payload placement in a final orbit by the use of low-thrust electric propulsion or with the use of a small kick stage to circularize the orbit. The kick stage itself may be designed with the excess-propellant capability to be able to self-deorbit.

=== Self-removal ===
Although the ITU requires geostationary satellites to move to a graveyard orbit at the end of their lives, the selected orbital areas do not effectively protect GEO lanes. Rocket stages (or satellites) with enough propellant may make a direct, controlled de-orbit, or if this would require too much propellant, a satellite may be brought to an orbit where atmospheric drag would cause it to eventually de-orbit. This was done with the French Spot-1 satellite, reducing its atmospheric re-entry time from a projected 200 years to about 15 by lowering its altitude from 830 km (516 mi) to about 550 km (342 mi).

The Iridium constellation – 95 communication satellites launched during the five-year period between 1997 and 2002 – provides a set of data points on the limits of self-removal. The satellite operator – Iridium Communications – remained operational over the two-decade life of the satellites (albeit with a company name change through a corporate bankruptcy during the period) and, by December 2019, had "completed disposal of the last of its 65 working legacy satellites." However, this process left 30 satellites with a combined mass of (20,400 kg (45,000 lb), or nearly a third of the mass of this constellation) in LEO orbits at approximately 700 km (430 mi) altitude, where self-decay is slow. Of these satellites, 29 simply failed during their time in orbit and were thus unable to self-deorbit, while one – Iridium 33 – was involved in the 2009 satellite collision with the derelict Russian military satellite Kosmos-2251. No contingency plan was laid for the removal of satellites that were unable to remove themselves. In 2019, the CEO of Iridium, Matt Desch, said that Iridium would be willing to pay an active-debris-removal company to deorbit its remaining first-generation satellites if it were possible for an unrealistically low cost, say "US$10,000 per deorbit, but [he] acknowledged that price would likely be far below what a debris-removal company could realistically offer. 'You know at what point [it is] a no-brainer, but [I] expect the cost is really in the millions or tens of millions [of dollars], at which price I know it doesn't make sense.'"

Passive methods of increasing the orbital decay rate of spacecraft debris have been proposed. Instead of rockets, an electrodynamic tether could be attached to a spacecraft at launch; at the end of its lifetime, the tether would be rolled out to slow the spacecraft. Other proposals include a booster stage with a sail-like attachment and a large, thin, inflatable balloon envelope.

In late December 2022, ESA successfully carried out a demonstration of a breaking sail-based satellite deorbiter, ADEO, which could be used by mitigation measures and is part of ESA's Zero Debris Initiative. Around one year earlier, China also tested a drag sail.

=== Capture ===
A variety of approaches have been proposed, studied, or had ground subsystems built to use other spacecraft to remove existing space debris.

A consensus of speakers at a meeting in Brussels, Belgium in October 2012, organized by the US think tank Secure World Foundation and the French International Relations Institute, reported that removal of the largest debris would be required to prevent the risk to spacecraft becoming unacceptable in the foreseeable future (without adding to the inventory of dead spacecraft in LEO). As of 2019, removal costs and legal questions about ownership and the authority to remove defunct satellites have stymied national or international action. Current space law retains ownership of all satellites with their original operators, even debris or spacecraft which are defunct or threaten active missions.

Multiple companies made plans in the late 2010s to conduct external removal of their satellites in mid-LEO orbits. For example, OneWeb planned to use onboard self-removal as "plan A" for satellite deorbiting at the end of life, but if a satellite were unable to remove itself within one year of end of life, OneWeb would implement "plan B" and dispatch a reusable (multi-transport mission) space tug to attach to the satellite at an already built-in capture target via a grappling fixture, to be towed to a lower orbit and released for re-entry.

==== Remotely controlled vehicles ====
A well-studied solution uses a remotely controlled vehicle to rendezvous with, capture and detumble, and return debris to a central station. One such system is Space Infrastructure Servicing (SIS), a commercially developed refueling depot and service spacecraft for communications satellites in geosynchronous orbit originally scheduled for a 2015 launch. The SIS would be able to "push dead satellites into graveyard orbits." The Advanced Common Evolved Stage family of upper stages is being designed with a high leftover-propellant margin (for derelict capture and de-orbit) and in-space refueling capability for the high delta-v required to de-orbit heavy objects from geosynchronous orbit. A tug-like satellite to drag debris to a safe altitude for it to burn up in the atmosphere has been researched. When debris is identified the satellite creates a difference in potential between the debris and itself, then using its thrusters to move itself and the debris to a safer orbit.

A variation of this approach is for the remotely controlled vehicle to rendezvous with debris, capture it temporarily to attach a smaller de-orbit satellite and drag the debris with a tether to the desired location. The "mothership" would then tow the debris-smallsat combination for atmospheric entry or move it to a graveyard orbit. One such system is the proposed Busek ORbital DEbris Remover, which would carry over 40 SUL (satellite on umbilical line) de-orbit satellites and propellant sufficient for their removal.

On 7 January 2010, Star, Incorporated reported that it received a contract from the Space and Naval Warfare Systems Command for a feasibility study of the ElectroDynamic Debris Eliminator propellantless spacecraft for space-debris removal. In February 2012 the Swiss Space Center at École Polytechnique Fédérale de Lausanne (EPFL) announced the Clean Space One project, a nanosatellite demonstration project for matching orbit with a defunct Swiss nanosatellite, capturing it and de-orbiting together. The mission has seen several evolutions to reach a pac-man inspired capture model. In 2013, Space Sweeper with Sling-Sat, a grappling satellite which captures and ejects debris was studied. In 2022, a Chinese satellite, SJ-21, grabbed an unused satellite and "threw" it into an orbit with a lower risk for it to collide.

In December 2019, the ESA awarded the first contract to clean up space debris. The €120 million mission dubbed ClearSpace-1 (a spinoff from the EPFL project) is slated to launch in 2026. It aims to remove the 94 kg PROBA-1 satellite from orbit. A "chaser" will grab the junk with four robotic arms and drag it down to Earth's atmosphere where both will burn up.

==== Laser ====
The laser broom uses a ground-based laser to ablate the front of the debris, producing a rocket-like thrust that slows and detumbles the object. With continued application, the debris would fall enough to be influenced by atmospheric drag. During the late 1990s, the US Air Force's Project Orion was a laser-broom design. Although a test-bed device was scheduled to launch on a Space Shuttle in 2003, international agreements banning powerful laser testing in orbit limited its use to measurements. The 2003 Space Shuttle Columbia disaster postponed the project and according to Nicholas Johnson, chief scientist and program manager for NASA's Orbital Debris Program Office, "There are lots of little gotchas in the Orion final report. There's a reason why it's been sitting on the shelf for more than a decade."

The momentum of the laser-beam photons could directly impart a thrust on the debris sufficient to move small debris into new orbits out of the way of working satellites. NASA research in 2011 indicates that firing a laser beam at a piece of space junk could impart an impulse of 1 mm (0.039 in) per second, and keeping the laser on the debris for a few hours per day could alter its course by 200 m (660 ft) per day. One drawback is the potential for material degradation; the energy may break up the debris, adding to the problem. A similar proposal places the laser on a satellite in Sun-synchronous orbit, using a pulsed beam to push satellites into lower orbits to accelerate their reentry. A proposal to replace the laser with an Ion Beam Shepherd has been made, and other proposals use a foamy ball of aerogel or a spray of water, inflatable balloons, electrodynamic tethers, electroadhesion, and dedicated anti-satellite weapons.

==== Nets ====
On 28 February 2014, Japan Aerospace Exploration Agency (JAXA) launched a test "space net" satellite. The launch was an operational test only. In December 2016 the country sent a space junk collector via Kounotori 6 to the ISS by which JAXA scientists experimented to pull junk out of orbit using a tether. The system failed to extend a 700-meter tether from a space station resupply vehicle that was returning to Earth. On 6 February the mission was declared a failure and leading researcher Koichi Inoue told reporters that they "believe the tether did not get released".

Between 2012 and 2018, the ESA was working on the design of a mission to remove large space debris from orbit using mechanical tentacles or nets. The mission, e.Deorbit, had an objective to remove debris heavier than 4,000 kilograms (8,800 lb) from LEO. Several capture techniques were studied, including a net, a harpoon, and a combination robot arm and clamping mechanism., which also serve as detumbling devices. Funding of the mission was stopped in 2018 in favor of the ClearSpace-1 mission, which is under development.

==== Harpoon ====
The RemoveDEBRIS mission plan is to test the efficacy of several ADR technologies on mock targets in low Earth orbit. In order to complete its planned experiments, the platform is equipped with a net, a harpoon, a laser ranging instrument, a dragsail, and two CubeSats (miniature research satellites). The mission was launched on 2 April 2018.

==== Recycling space debris ====
Metal processing technologies to melt space debris and transform it into other useful form factors are developed by CisLunar Industries. Their system uses electromagnetic heating to melt metal and shape it into metal wire, sheet metal, and metal fuel.

One long-standing approach to protecting satellites is a Whipple shield—a two-stage affair which places an outlying bumper a few centimetres above a main shield, both of which are typically made of aluminium. The bumper breaks an incoming object into a spray of smaller, less energetic fragments that the main shield can then stop more easily. But this arrangement is bulky and heavy. So most satellites simply take their chances behind aluminium panels stiffened with a honeycomb also made of that metal. These offer only limited protection from debris.

==== Armour ====
Satellites are typically shielded behind aluminium panels stiffened with an aluminium honeycomb. Instead, Whipple shields include a bumper placed a few centimetres above a main shield, both typically of aluminium. The bumper is intended to break debris into smaller, less energetic fragments that the shield then deflects. The device is considered to be heavy and offer limited protection.

Hand-sized composite tiles, under development by Atomic-6, are 2.5cm thick and weigh about as much as a phone. The company claimed that they stop pea-sized aluminium projectiles traveling at 7.2 km/s (4.5 mi/s). They vaporise rather than deflect (metal) debris.

Another approach combines Kevlar with Nextel, a woven ceramic. It is targeted at smaller, less expensive spacecraft where light weight is essential.

Another design combines aluminium, Kevlar and carbon fibre-reinforced resin. It uses 3D printing and embeds voids throughout. These voids act as Whipple mini-shields, fragmenting and deflecting debris.

Aluminium foam with ~5mm voids was tested by NASA, which reported that a foam around 6mm thick provided the same protection as a Whipple shield of twice the weight.

==== Reuse ====
A propulsion system dubbed the Neumann Drive has been developed in Adelaide, South Australia, and first sent into space in June 2023. Metal space junk is converted into fuel rods, which can be plugged into the Neumann Drive, "basically converting the solid metal propellant into plasma". The Drive is intended to be used by American space companies which already carry nets or robotic arms to capture orbital waste. The thruster would enable these satellites to return to Earth with the waste they have collected, allowing it to be melted down to make more fuel.

=== Barriers to dealing with debris ===
With the rapid development of the computer and digitalization industries, more countries and companies have engaged in space activities since the turn of the 21st century. The tragedy of the commons is an economic theory referring to a situation where maximizing self-interest through using a shared resource can lead to the resource degradation shared by all. Based on the theory, individuals' rational action in space will lead to an irrational collective result: orbits crowded with debris. As a common-pool resource, the Earth's orbits, especially LEO and GEO that accommodate most satellites, are nonexcludable and rivalrous.

To address the issue and ensure space sustainability, many technical approaches have been developed. In terms of governance mechanisms, a top-down centralized one is less suitable to tackle the complex debris problem due to the increasing number of space actors. Instead, a polycentric form of governance developed by Elinor Ostrom has been proposed although the promotion of the polycentric network has not been fully developed.

==== Incomplete data ====
As orbital debris is a global problem affecting both spacefaring and non-spacefaring nations, it is necessary to be handled in a worldwide context. Because of the complexity and dynamics of object movements like spacecraft, debris, meteorites, etc., many countries and regions including the United States, Europe, Russia, and China have developed their space situational awareness (SSA) to avoid potential threats in space or plan actions in advance. To an extent, SSA plays a role in tracking space debris. In order to build a powerful SSA system, there are two prerequisites: international cooperation and exchange of information and data. However, limitations exist in spite of the improving data quality over the past decades. Some space powers are not willing to share the information that they have collected, and those, such as the US, that have shared the data keep parts of it secret. Instead of joining in a coordinated way, a many SSA programs and national databases run parallel to each other with some overlaps, hindering the formation of a collaborative monitoring system.

Some private actors are also trying to establish SSA systems. For example, the Space Data Association (SDA) formed in 2009 is a non-governmental entity. It currently consists of 21 global satellite operators and 4 executive members: Eutelsat, Inmarsat, Intelsat, and SES. SDA is a non-profit platform, aiming to avoid radio interference and space collisions through pooling data from operators independently. Researchers suggest that it is essential to establish an international center for exchanging information on space debris because SSA networks do not completely equal debris tracking systems – the former ones focus more on active and threatening objects in space. In terms of debris populations and defunct satellites, few operators have provided data.

In a polycentric governance network, a resource that cannot be holistically monitored is less likely to be well managed. Both insufficient transnational cooperation and information sharing bring resistance to addressing the debris problem. There is a long way to go to build a global network that covers complete data and has strong interconnection and interoperability.

==== Participation ====
With the commercialization of satellites and space, the private sector is getting more interested in space activities. For example, SpaceX is creating a network of around 12,000 small satellites that can transmit high-speed internet to any place in the world. The proportion of commercial spacecraft has increased from 4.6% in the 1980s to 55.6% in the 2010s. Despite the high participation rate of commercial entities, UN COPUOS once deliberately excluded them from having a voice in discussions unless being formally invited by a member state. Ostrom said that the involvement of all relevant stakeholders in the rule-design and implementation process is one of the critical elements of successful governance. The exclusion of private actors largely reduces the effectiveness of the UN committee's role in making collective-choice arrangements that reflect the interests of all space users.

The limited engagement of private actors slows the process of addressing space debris. Ties between dissimilar stakeholders in the governance network offer access to diverse resources. Different competence among stakeholders can help allocate the tasks more reasonably. In that case, the expertise and experience of private operators are critical to help the world achieve space sustainability. The complementary strengths of different stakeholders enable the governance network to be more adaptable to changes and reach common goals more effectively. In recent years, many private actors have seen commercial opportunities for eliminating space debris. It was estimated in 2018 that by 2022 the global market for debris monitoring and removal would generate a revenue of around $2.9 billion. For example, in 2021, Astroscale had contracted with European and Japanese space agencies to develop the capacity of removing orbital debris. Despite that, they are still in small quantity compared to the number of those who have placed satellites in space. Privateer Space, a Hawaiian-based startup company by American engineer Alex Fielding, space environmentalist Moriba Jah, and Apple co-founder Steve Wozniak, announced plans in September 2021 to launch hundreds of satellites into orbit in order to study space debris. However, the company stated it is in "stealth mode" and no such satellites have been launched.

Fortunately, space exploration is not completely driven by competition, and there exists an opportunity for dialogues and cooperation among all stakeholders in both developed and developing countries, to reach an agreement on tackling space debris and assure an equitable and orderly exploration. Besides private actors, network governance does not necessarily exclude the states from playing a role. Instead, the different functions of states might promote the governance process. To improve the polycentric governance network of space debris, researchers suggest: encourage data-sharing among different national and organizational databases at the political level; develop shared standards for data collection systems to improve interoperability; and enhance the participation of private actors through involving them in national and international discussions.

== On other celestial bodies ==
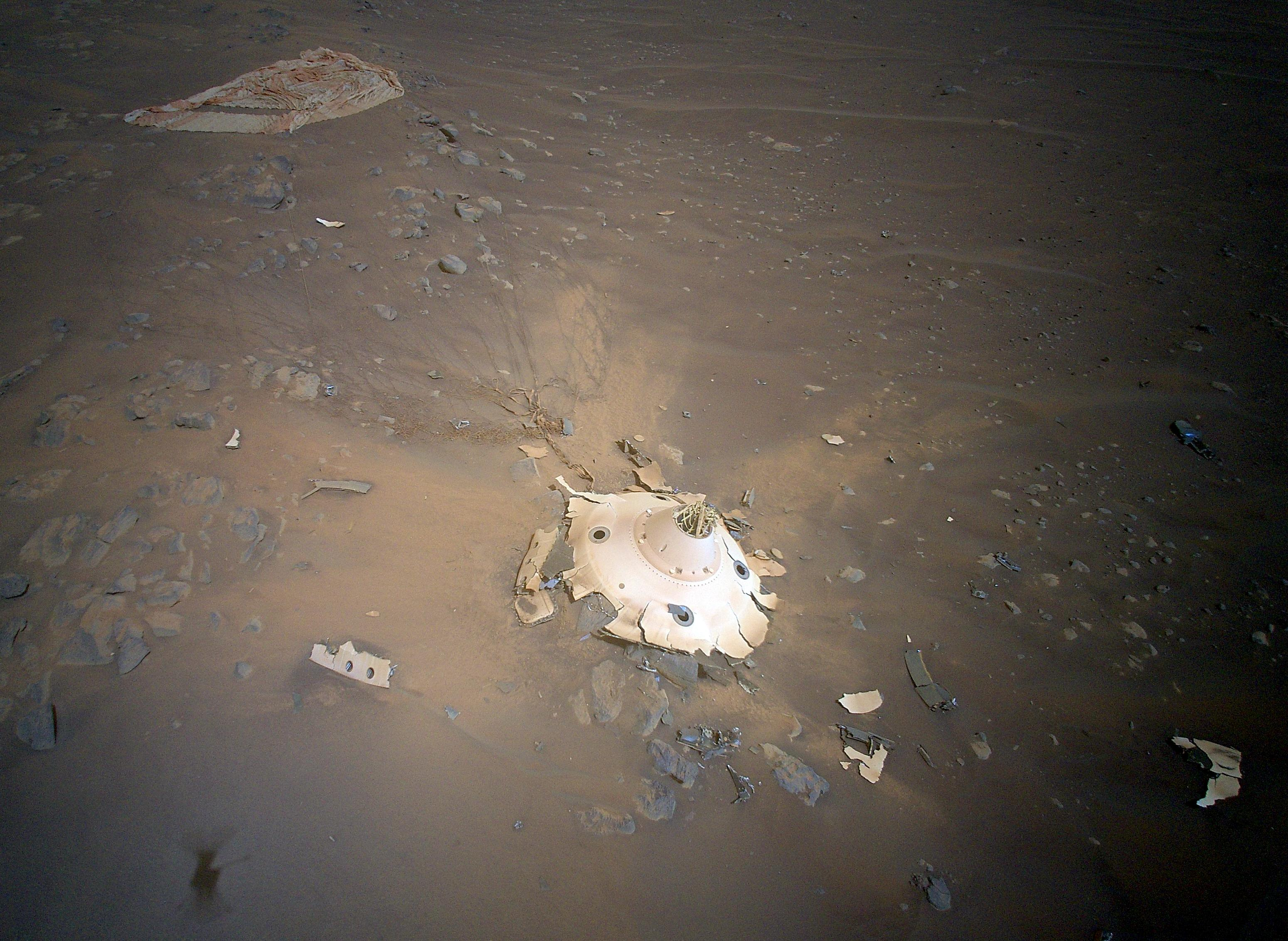
Perseverance's backshell sitting upright on the surface of Jezero Crater

The issue of space debris has been raised as a mitigation challenge for missions around the Moon with the danger of increasing space debris around it.

It is thought that on 4 March 2022, for the first time, human space debris – most likely a spent rocket body, Long March 3C third stage from the 2014 Chang'e 5 T1 mission – unintentionally hit the lunar surface, creating an unexpected double crater.

In 2022, several elements of space debris were found on Mars: Perseverance's backshell was found on the surface of Jezero Crater, and a piece of a thermal blanket which may have come from the descent stage of the rover.

As of February 2024, Mars is littered with about seven tons of human-made debris. Most of it consists of crashed and inactive spacecraft as well as discarded components.

== In popular culture ==
Until the End of the World (1991) is a French sci-fi drama set under the backdrop of an out-of-control Indian nuclear satellite, predicted to re-enter the atmosphere, threatening vast populated areas of the Earth.

Wall-E (2008) features a future Earth that is full of garbage and abandoned by humanity. As the titular robot leaves the planet and as the humans come back to Earth, they collide with derelict satellites.

In the 2009 Walt Disney Pictures film G-Force, the antagonist, Speckles (voiced by Nicolas Cage) orchestrates a plot to destroy humanity with a massive, planet-wide bombardment of space debris to make the Earth's surface uninhabitable.

Gravity, a 2013 survival film directed by Alfonso Cuaron, is about a disaster on a space mission caused by Kessler syndrome.

In season 1 of Love, Death & Robots (2019), episode 11, "Helping Hand", revolves around an astronaut being struck by a screw from space debris which knocks her off a satellite in orbit.

Manga and anime Planetes tells a story about a crew of Space Debris station that collects and disposes of space debris.

== See also ==
- Category:Derelict satellites
- Interplanetary contamination
- Kessler syndrome
- Liability Convention
- List of large reentering space debris
- List of space debris producing events
- Long Duration Exposure Facility
- Near-Earth object
- Orbital Debris Co-ordination Working Group
- Project West Ford
- Satellite warfare
- Solar Maximum Mission
- Spacecraft cemetery
- Space domain awareness
- Space sustainability
