= Fatoumata Kébé =

French astrophysicist and educator

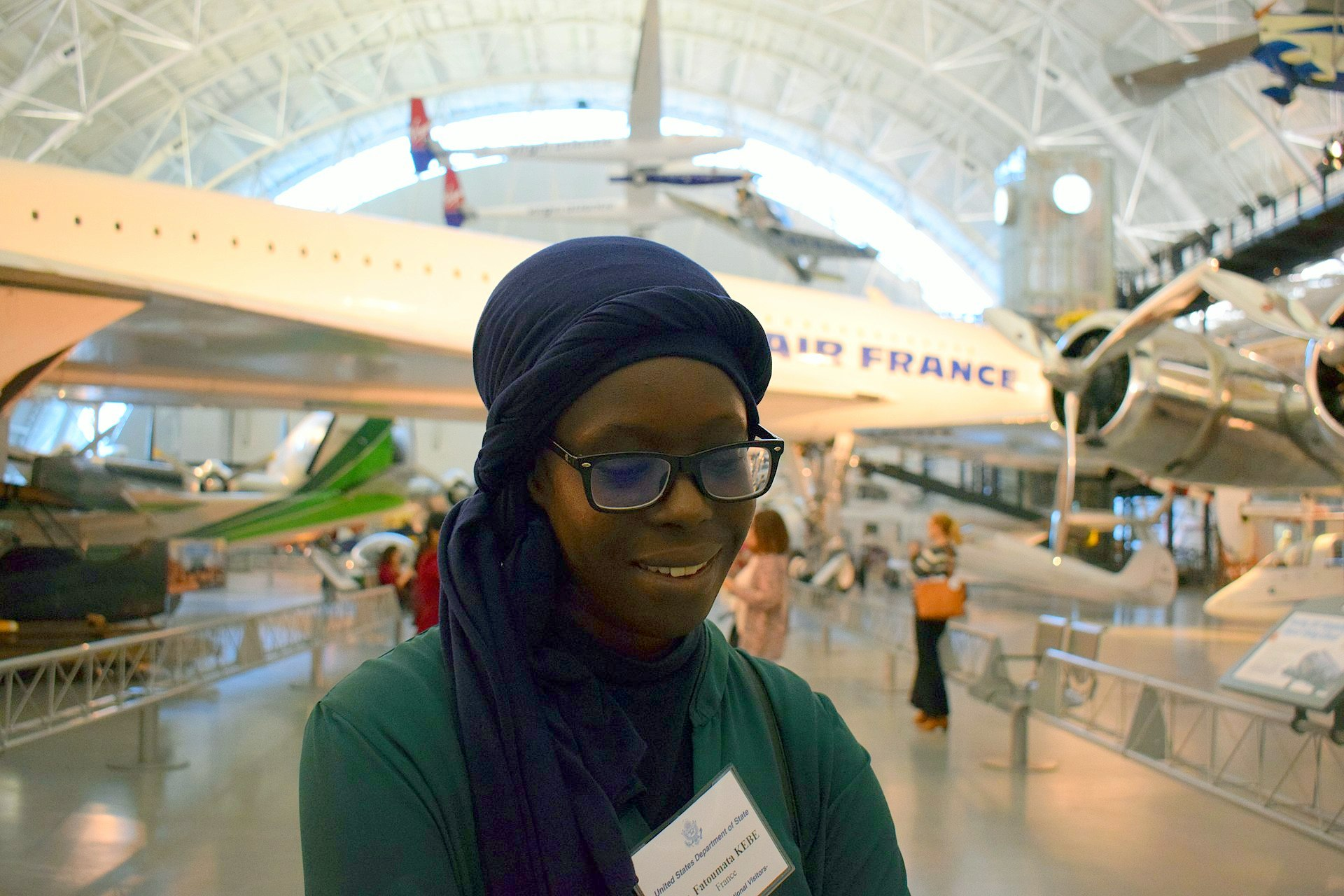
- Born: Montreuil, Seine-Saint-Denis
- Education: Pierre and Marie Curie University
- Known for: Space debris

Fatoumata Kébé (born 1986) is a French astrophysicist and educator. She specialises in space debris. She was named as one of Vanity Fair's Most Influential French People in the world in 2018.

== Early life and education ==
Kébé was born in Montreuil, Seine-Saint-Denis and grew up in Noisy-le-Sec. She has been interested in space since she was a child. At the age of eight she discovered her father's encyclopaedia in astronomy. Her favourite planet is Saturn. She studied fluid mechanics for her Master's studies at the Pierre and Marie Curie University. She worked multiple jobs alongside her studies. Kébé worked on space debris during her PhD, specialising in modelling fragmentation events to monitor the movement of debris. She worked at the Pierre and Marie Curie University Paris Observatory in the Institute for Celestial Mechanics and Computation of Ephemerides. She trained for a year at the University of Tokyo in space engineering, where she worked on the construction of small satellites. Here she launched Connected Eco, a project that works with women in Mali to protect the environment from over farming. She designed solar powered sensors that monitor the drought level of soil and send information by SMS to farmers. The project won an International Telecommunication Union Young Innovators Challenge. She was awarded a United Nations Alliance of Civilizations fellowship. She earned a doctorate in 2016; her dissertation was titled Etude de l'influence des incréments de vitesse impulsionnels sur les trajectoires de débris spatiaux. She was an intern at NASA, Centre national de la recherche scientifique and International Space University.

== Career ==
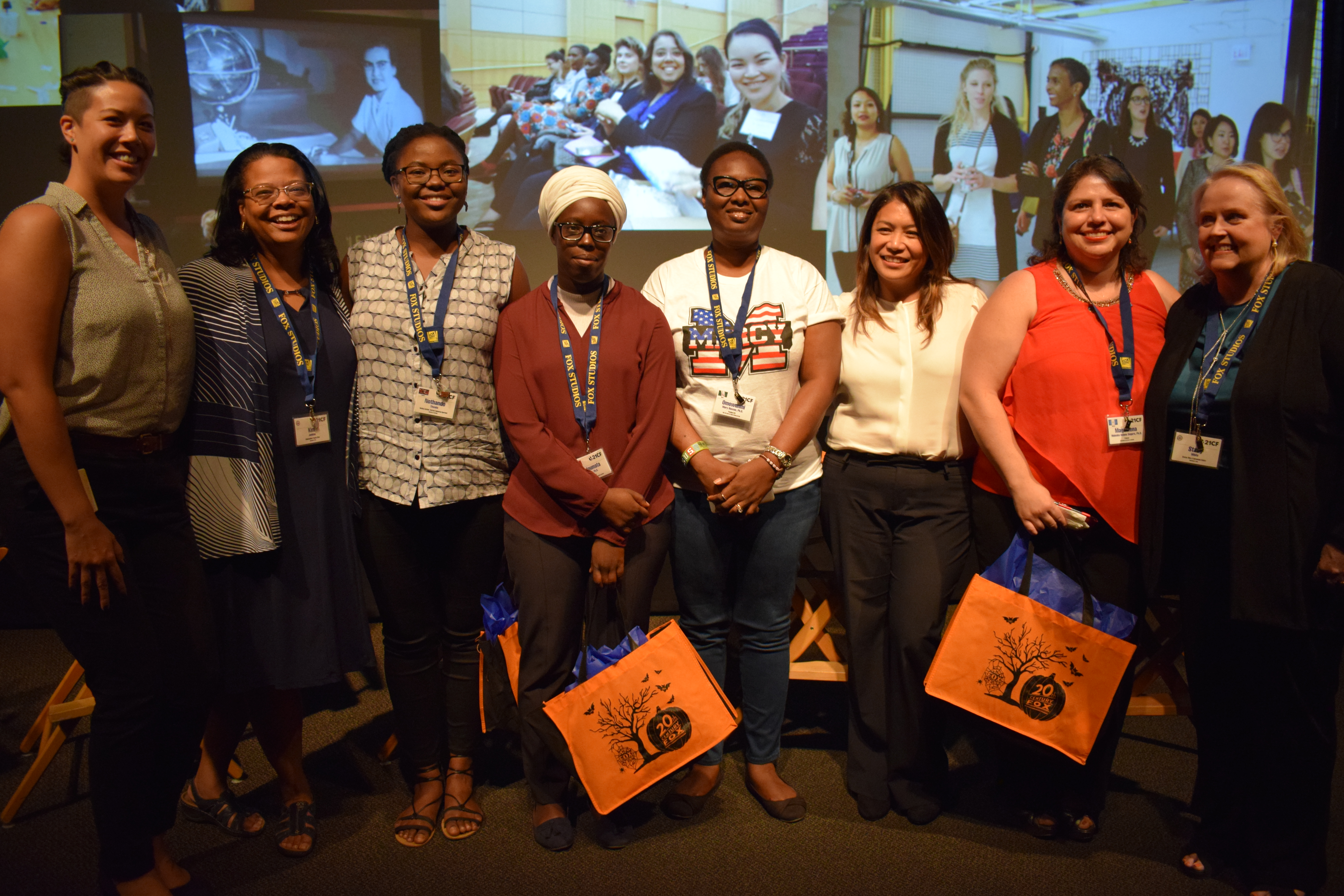
Kébé at 21st Century Fox during the 2017 Hidden No More International Visitor Leadership Program.

Kébé was featured in the Space Girls Space Women exhibition in 2015. The exhibition was held at the Musée des Arts et Métiers in Paris. She has delivered two TED Talks, Le ciel est un menteur and L'Astronomie, ma passion. She was invited to the European Space Agency Women in Aerospace roundtable. She was a keynote speaker at the Change Now summit in 2017. She was selected by the United States Department of State for an International Visitor Leadership Program in October 2017. In March 2018 she was featured in a video campaign by Glamour. She was included in the Grazia feature Women scientists, figures in the shadows. She was named as one Vanity Fair's Most Influential French People in the world in 2018.

=== Ephemerides ===
Alongside her research, Kébé campaigns to improve access to astronomy and physics. She appeared on France Inter in 2017. Kébé founded Ephemerides, a program that provides astronomy classes for high school students from disadvantaged backgrounds. It teaches students that are 12 to 15 years old. She works with four colleges, including Seine-Saint-Denis, Bobigny and Villetaneuse. In 2018 Ephemerides launched in Bamako. She funds the project with money from Fondation de France.
