= Spin stabilization =

Method of stabilizing a satellite or launch vehicle

In aerospace engineering, spin stabilization is a method of stabilizing a satellite or launch vehicle by means of spin, i.e. rotation along the longitudinal axis. The concept originates from conservation of angular momentum as applied to ballistics, where the spin is commonly obtained by means of rifling. For most satellite applications this approach has been superseded by three-axis stabilization.

== Use ==
Spin-stabilization is used on rockets and spacecraft where attitude control is required without the requirement for on-board 3-axis propulsion or mechanisms, and sensors for attitude control and pointing. On rockets with a solid motor upper stage, spin stabilization is used to keep the motor from drifting off course as they don't have their own thrusters. Usually small rockets are used to spin up the spacecraft and rocket then fire the rocket and send the craft off.

Rockets and spacecraft that use spin stabilization:

- The Jupiter-C and Minotaur V launch vehicles used spin-stabilization. The upper stages on both system employ spin-stabilization to stabilize the system during propulsive maneuvers.
- The Aryabhata satellite used spin-stabilization
- The Pioneer 4 spacecraft, the second object sent on a lunar flyby in 1959, maintained its attitude using spin-stabilization.
- The Schiaparelli EDM lander was spun up to 2.5 RPM before being ejected from the ExoMars Trace Gas Orbiter prior to its attempted landing on Mars in October 2016.
- The Juno spacecraft was spin-stabilized and arrived at Jupiter orbit in 2016.
- The launches of Pioneer 10 and Pioneer 11 probes on two Atlas Centaur vehicles in 1972 and 1973 employed Star 37 rocket motors that were spin-stabilized in order to inject the satellites into the high-energy hyperbolic orbits necessary to achieve solar system escape velocity. Additionally, both probes were spin-stabilized during their flights and rotated at approximately 5 rpm.
- In operation as a third stage, the Star 48 rocket booster sits on top of spin table, and before it is separated it is spun up to stabilize it during the separation from the previous stage. The Delta II launch vehicle third stage employed a Star 48 motor and was spin-stabilized and depended on the second stage for proper orientation prior to stage separation, but was sometimes equipped with a nutation control system to maintain proper spin axis. It also included a yo-weight system to induce tumbling in the third stage after payload separation to prevent recontact, or a yo-yo de-spin mechanism to slow the rotation before payload release.

Despinning can be achieved by various techniques, including yo-yo de-spin.

With advancements in attitude control propulsion systems, guidance systems, and the needs for satellites to point instruments and communications systems precisely, 3-axis attitude control has become much more common than spin-stabilization for systems operating in space.

== See also ==
- Gyroscope
- Spin-stabilized satellite
