= USA-193 =

U.S. military satellite (2006–2008)

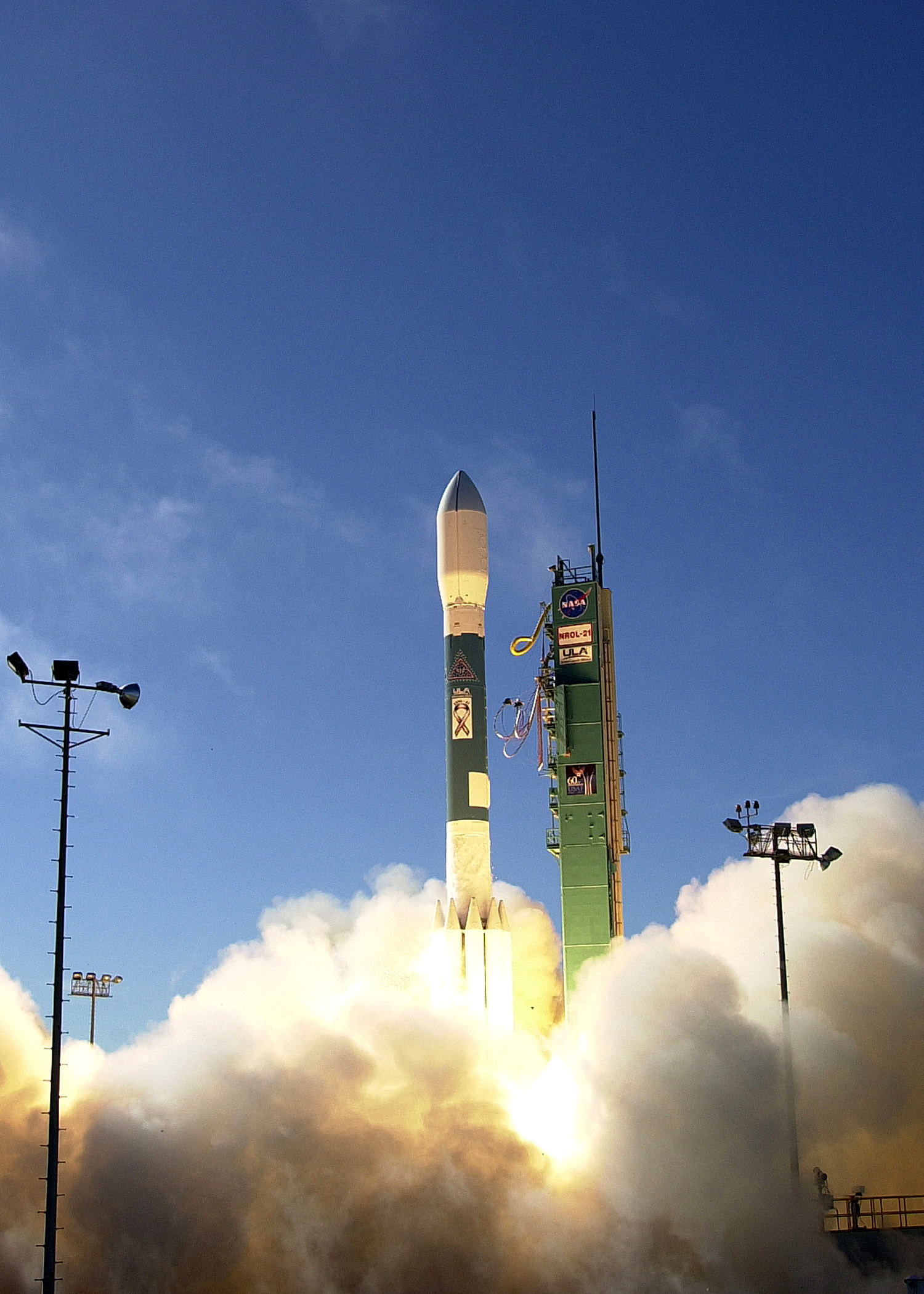
- Delta II launching USA-193, from Vandenberg Air Force Base, in December 2006
- Names: NROL-21; NRO Launch 21; L-21
- Mission type: Reconnaissance radar imaging
- Operator: National Reconnaissance Office (NRO)
- COSPAR ID: 2006-057A
- SATCAT no.: 29651
- Mission duration: Communications with satellite not maintained after launch

Spacecraft properties
- Manufacturer: Initially Boeing, then Lockheed Martin
- Launch mass: 2,300 kg (5,100 lb)

Start of mission
- Launch date: 14 December 2006, 21:00:00 UTC
- Rocket: Delta II 7920-10
- Launch site: Vandenberg, SLC-2W
- Contractor: United Launch Alliance

End of mission
- Disposal: Destroyed by heavily modified missile defence interceptor launched from USS Lake Erie (CG-70)
- Destroyed: 21 February 2008

Orbital parameters
- Reference system: Geocentric orbit
- Regime: Low Earth orbit
- Perigee altitude: 349 km (217 mi)
- Apogee altitude: 365 km (227 mi)
- Inclination: 58.48°
- Period: 92.0 minutes

USA-193, also known as NRO Launch 21 (NROL-21 or simply L-21), was a United States military reconnaissance satellite (radar imaging) launched on 14 December 2006. It was the first launch conducted by the United Launch Alliance (ULA). Owned by the National Reconnaissance Office (NRO), the craft's exact function and purpose were classified. On 21 February 2008, it was destroyed as a result of Operation Burnt Frost.

== Design ==
USA-193 was part of the NRO's Future Imagery Architecture (FIA), which was begun in 1997 to produce a fleet of inexpensive reconnaissance satellites, but has become the agency's most spectacular failure. USA-193 was initially developed by Boeing, which won the contract in 1999, beating out Lockheed Martin with proposals for innovative electro-optics and radar. But after cost overruns, delays, and parts failures, NRO sent the contract to Lockheed, which built USA-193 around the Boeing radar design. Lockheed Martin and Boeing both supported the launch, the first in the joint effort known as the United Launch Alliance. USA-193 weighed about 2,300 kg (5,100 lb), with a body thought to be 4.6 m (15 ft) long and 2.4 m (7 ft 10 in) wide, estimates based on the maximal Delta II payload. With the radar antenna extended, USA-193 was about the size of a basketball court (~30 × 15 m).

== Launch data ==
- Launch: 14 December 2006 at 21:00:00 UTC
- Launch vehicle: United Launch Alliance Delta II-7920 launch vehicle
- Launch site: Vandenberg Air Force Base, California, United States
- Launch facility: Space Launch Complex 2W
- Orbit data: not officially available, as spy satellites often change position and do not have regular orbits. Reported by amateur observers to be (perigee, apogee, inclination):
  - 349 km × 365 km × 58.48° after launch,
  - 255 km × 268 km × 58.48° on 11 February 2008,
  - 244 km × 261 km × 58.50° on 19 February 2008.
  - The orbit was decaying at an increasing rate.

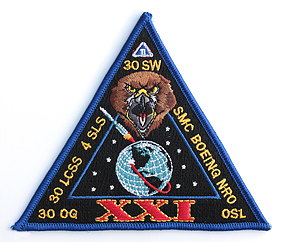
USA-193 (NROL-21) launch patch

== Malfunction and orbital decay ==
The satellite entered orbit, but lost contact with the ground within hours. In late January 2008, reports from anonymous U.S. officials indicated a U.S. spy satellite, later confirmed as USA-193, was in a deteriorating orbit and was expected to crash into Earth within weeks. This came as no surprise to amateur satellite watchers, who had been predicting the deorbit of the satellite for some time.

The satellite malfunctioned shortly after deployment and was intentionally destroyed 14 months later on 21 February 2008 by a modified SM-3 missile fired from the U.S. Navy warship USS Lake Erie (CG-70), stationed west of Hawaii. The event highlighted growing distrust between the U.S. and China, and was viewed by some to be part of a wider "arms race" in space involving the U.S., China, and Russia. It was the first launch by United Launch Alliance since it was formed in December 2006, and the first Delta II launch since ULA acquisition.

== Hazardous materials on-board ==
The Federal Emergency Management Agency (FEMA) reports indicate that the satellite contained the hazardous materials hydrazine and beryllium. Though there was some speculation that the satellite might have a "nuclear" power core, i.e. a radioisotope thermoelectric generator (RTG), the FEMA report indicates otherwise. On 29 January 2008, an Associated Press story quoted U.S. Air Force General Gene Renuart as saying that contingency plans were being made, since intact pieces of the satellite "might re-enter into the North American area". In respecting the Space Liability Convention, the United States vowed to pay for any damage or destruction caused by their failed satellite.

== Destruction ==
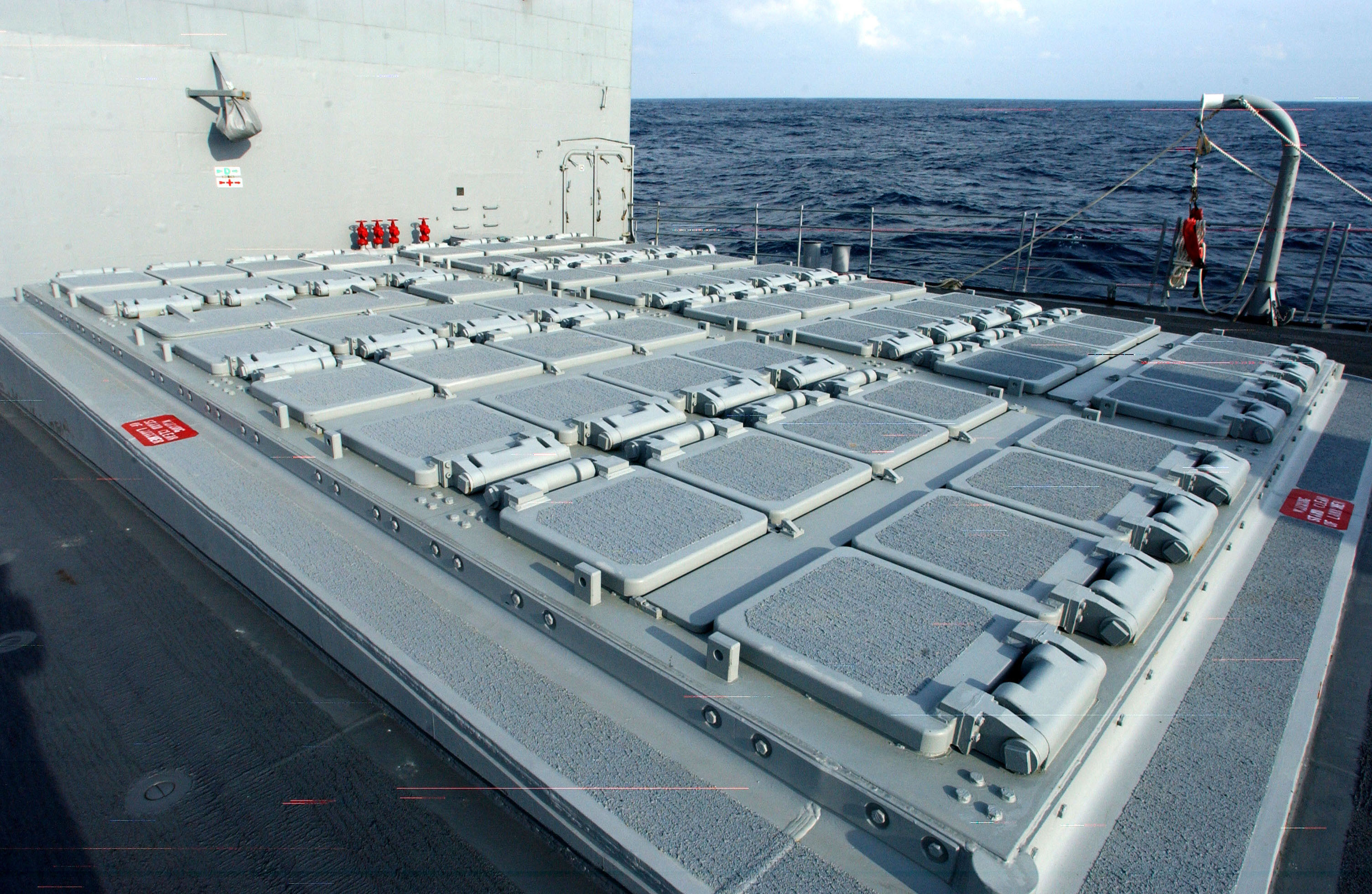
View of the vertical launching system on a Ticonderoga-class cruiser

Planning for the destruction of USA-193 with a missile reportedly began on 4 January 2008, with President Bush approving the plan on 12 February 2008, at an expected cost of US$40 million to US$60 million. The task force had as its goal to "rupture the fuel tank to dissipate the approximately 453 kg (999 lb) of hydrazine, a hazardous fuel, which could pose a danger to people on Earth, before it entered into Earth's atmosphere".

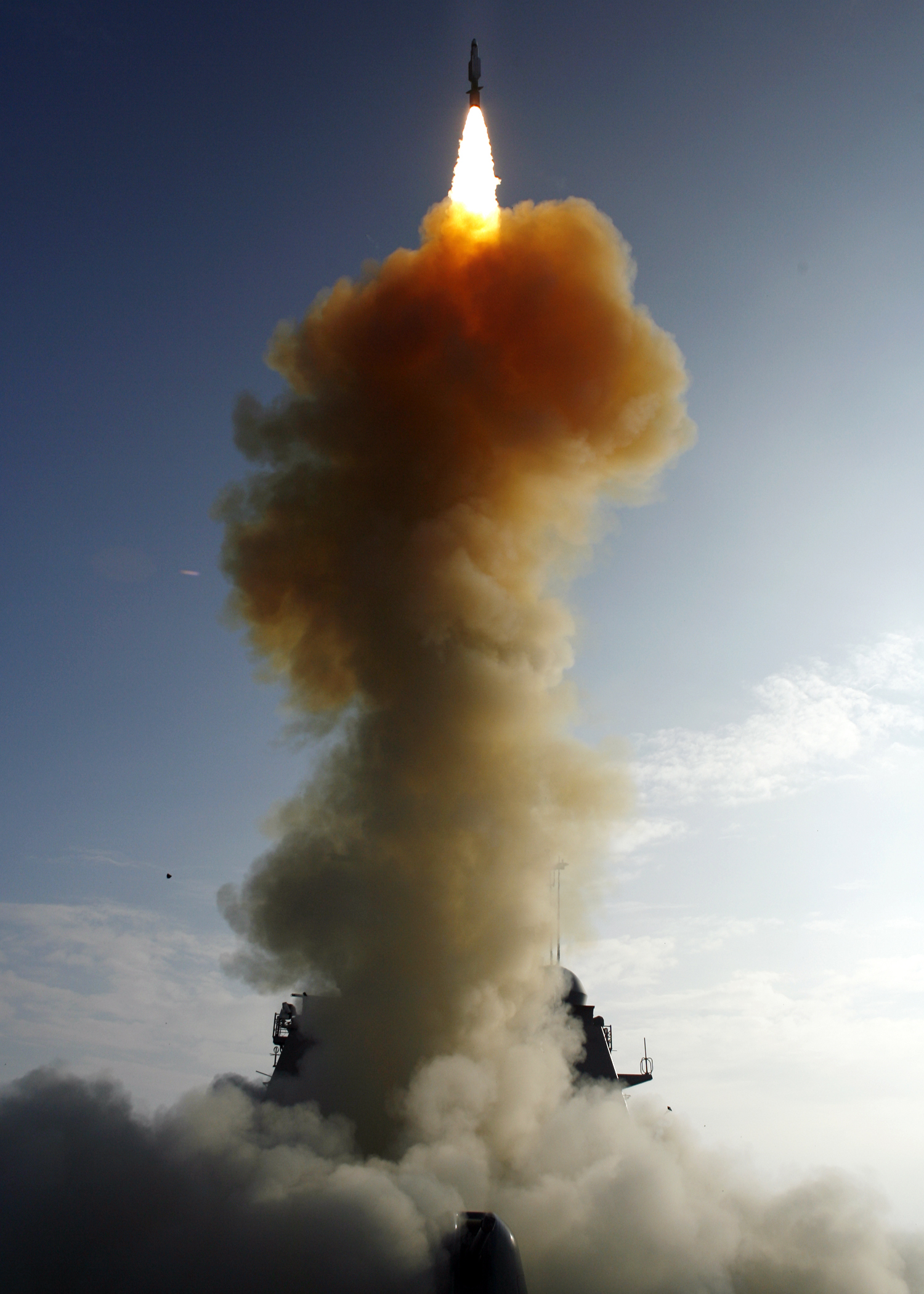
Launch of the SM-3 missile that intercepted USA-193

On 14 February 2008, U.S. officials announced the plan to destroy USA-193 before atmospheric reentry, stating that the intention was "saving or reducing injury to human life". They said that if the hydrazine tank fell to Earth, it "could spread a toxic cloud roughly the size of two football fields". General James Cartwright confirmed that the United States Navy was preparing to launch an SM-3 missile to destroy the satellite, at an altitude of 247 km (153 mi), shortly before it entered Earth's atmosphere.

On 21 February 2008, at 03:26 UTC an SM-3 missile was fired from the Ticonderoga-class missile cruiser USS Lake Erie (CG-70) and intercepted USA-193 about 247 km (153 mi) above the Pacific Ocean. The satellite was traveling with a velocity of 28,000 km/h (17,000 mph), or 7.8 km/s (4.8 mi/s). The velocity of the impact was about 35,000 km/h (22,000 mph). The United States Department of Defense (DoD) expressed a "high degree of confidence" that the fuel tank was hit and destroyed. The satellite's remnants were expected to burn up over the course of the next 40 days, with most of the satellite's mass re-entering the atmosphere within 48 hours of the missile strike.

U.S. officials denied that the action was intended to prevent sensitive technology falling into foreign hands and also denied that it was a response to the 2007 Chinese anti-satellite missile test. This was not the first time the United States shot down one of its own satellites; the Air Force had shot down a satellite in 1985. Although the U.S. had objected to the earlier Chinese test of an anti-satellite (ASAT) weapon, U.S. officials said there was "no parallel" with that test. The Chinese test destroyed a target in a high, stable orbit, leaving a large amount of space debris in orbit, while the destruction of USA-193 in a much lower orbit would create debris that would likely deorbit within weeks.

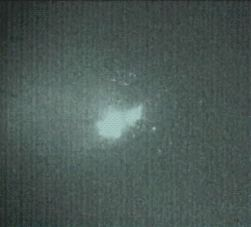
Break-up of USA-193 following interception by the SM-3 missile

== Controversy ==
The Russian government claimed that this exercise was a test of the U.S. missile defense program. The defense ministry of Russia accused the U.S. of using hydrazine as a cover for the test of an ASAT. It also noted that extraordinary measures had never before been needed to deal with the many spacecraft that had fallen to Earth. Indeed, The New York Times had paraphrased Gordon Johndroe, spokesman for the United States National Security Council, as stating that 328 objects had deorbited (controlled and uncontrolled) in the previous five-year period.

However, U.S. officials maintained that the large quantity of hydrazine on board made USA-193 a special case. According to General Kevin P. Chilton, when George Bush was briefed on the situation, the danger that shooting down the satellite would be perceived as an ASAT test was brought up, and Bush made his decision based on the dangers of an uncontrolled reentry.

Other observers dismiss the threat of the hydrazine, suggesting that the effect of the cloud, when diluted over a large area, would likely be mild: "The hydrazine tank is a 1-meter sphere containing about 400 liters of hydrazine. The stated hazard area is about 2 hectares, something like 1/10,000,000,000 of the area under the orbit. The potential for actual harm is unbelievably small". Other analyses, such as those cited by Yousaf Butt, show the hydrazine tank burning up in the upper atmosphere.

Two examples of uncontrolled atmospheric re-entries causing (or almost causing) damage are the 1978 re-entry of Kosmos 954, a Soviet satellite, which landed in Canada and spread dangerous amounts of nuclear fuel from its onboard reactor over large tracts of land, and Skylab's 1979 re-entry, which rattled windows and dropped small pieces of debris onto buildings in Esperance, Western Australia (no significant monetary damage resulted, but the U.S. was symbolically fined US$400 for littering). No weapon existed in 1978 to bring down Kosmos 954, and a Soviet anti-satellite weapon (part of the Istrebitel Sputnikov program), the first of its kind, was declared operational only ten days before Skylab re-entered the atmosphere, and was not capable of directing the space station's descent.

Before the destruction of USA-193, Pentagon officials repeatedly denied that it was meant to bolster the U.S. missile defense program. Six days after USA-193's destruction, Defense Secretary Robert M. Gates said, "the mission's success shows that U.S. plans for a missile-defense system are realistic" though in the same statement it was claimed that the weapons and systems used for this mission will not retain their ASAT capability, and will be reconfigured back to their original purpose as tactical missiles.

== Space debris ==
The destruction of USA-193 created 174 pieces of orbital debris that were cataloged by the U.S. military. While most of this debris re-entered the Earth's atmosphere within a few months, a few pieces lasted slightly longer because they were thrown into higher orbits. The final piece of USA-193 debris (COSPAR 2006-057GH, SATCAT 35425) re-entered on 28 October 2009.

The launch of at least one other satellite was postponed to avoid space debris from USA-193. An Atlas V launch hot line recording indicated the debris would delay the launch of a different National Reconnaissance Office (NRO) satellite USA-200 (NROL-28) as "a precautionary measure".

== Catalogue IDs ==
- International Designator: 2006-057A
- Satellite Catalog Number: 29651

== Gallery ==
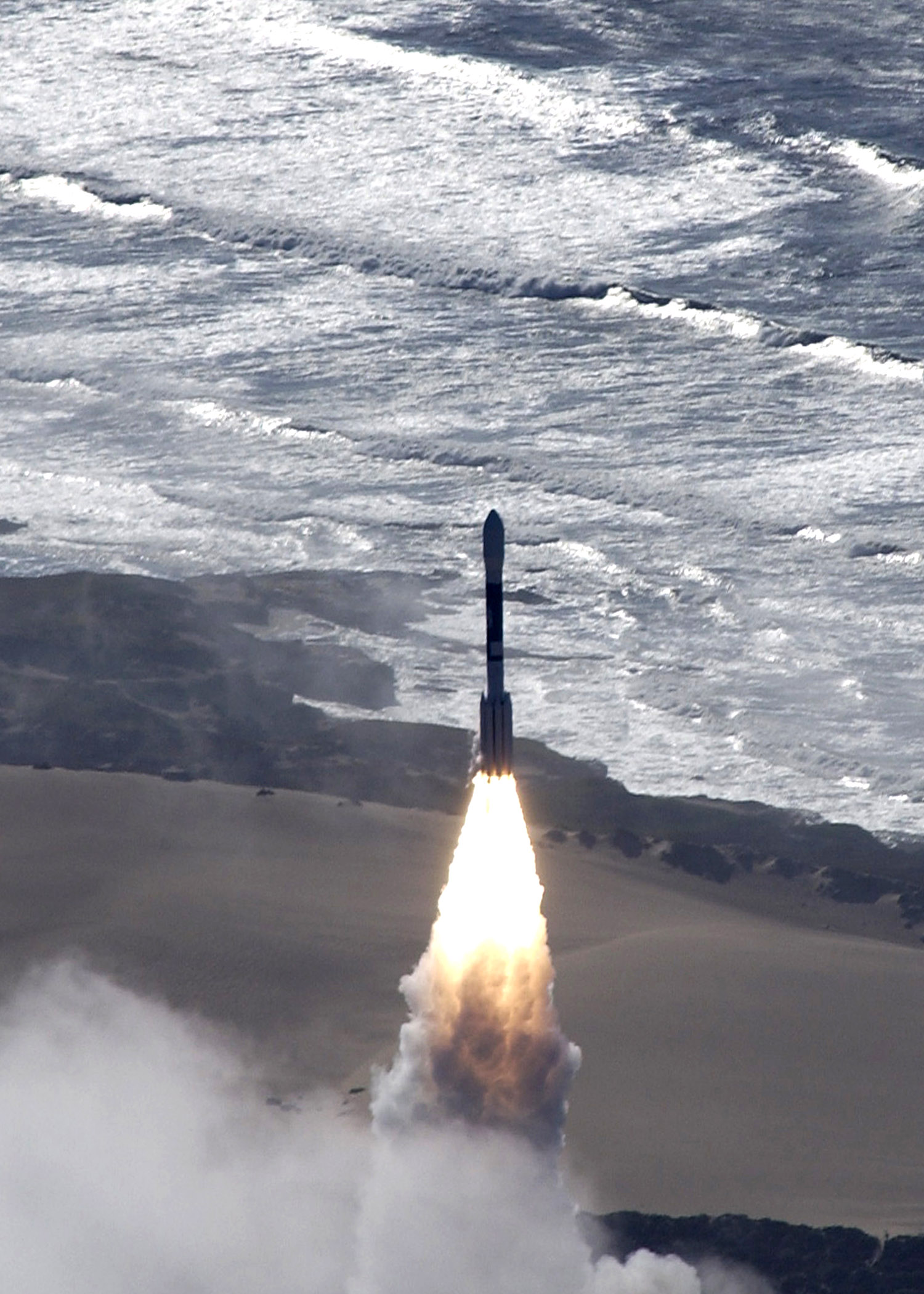
Delta II launched carrying USA-193, Vandenberg Space Force Base, California, December 2006

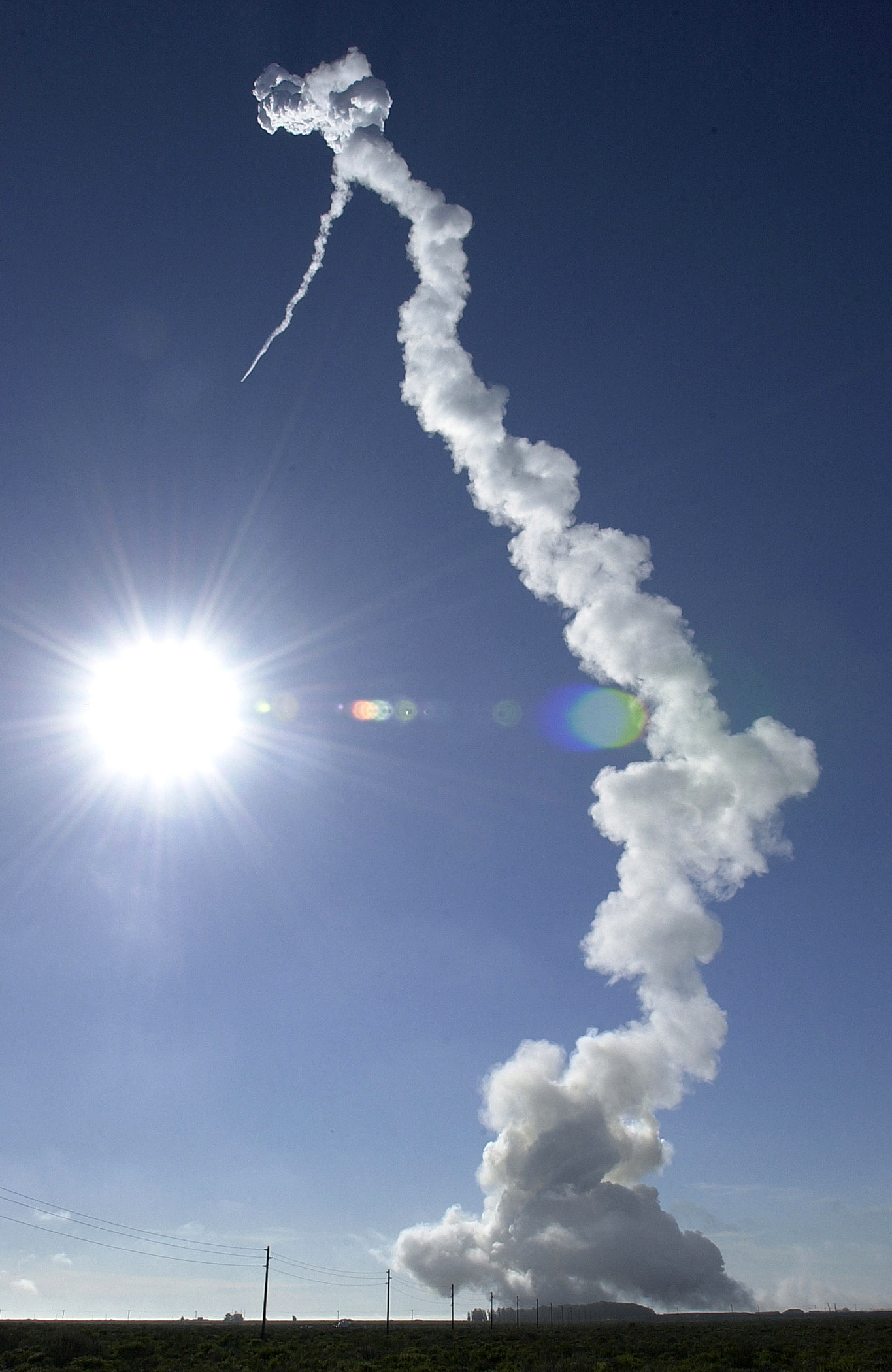
Delta II leaving Vandenberg, December 2006

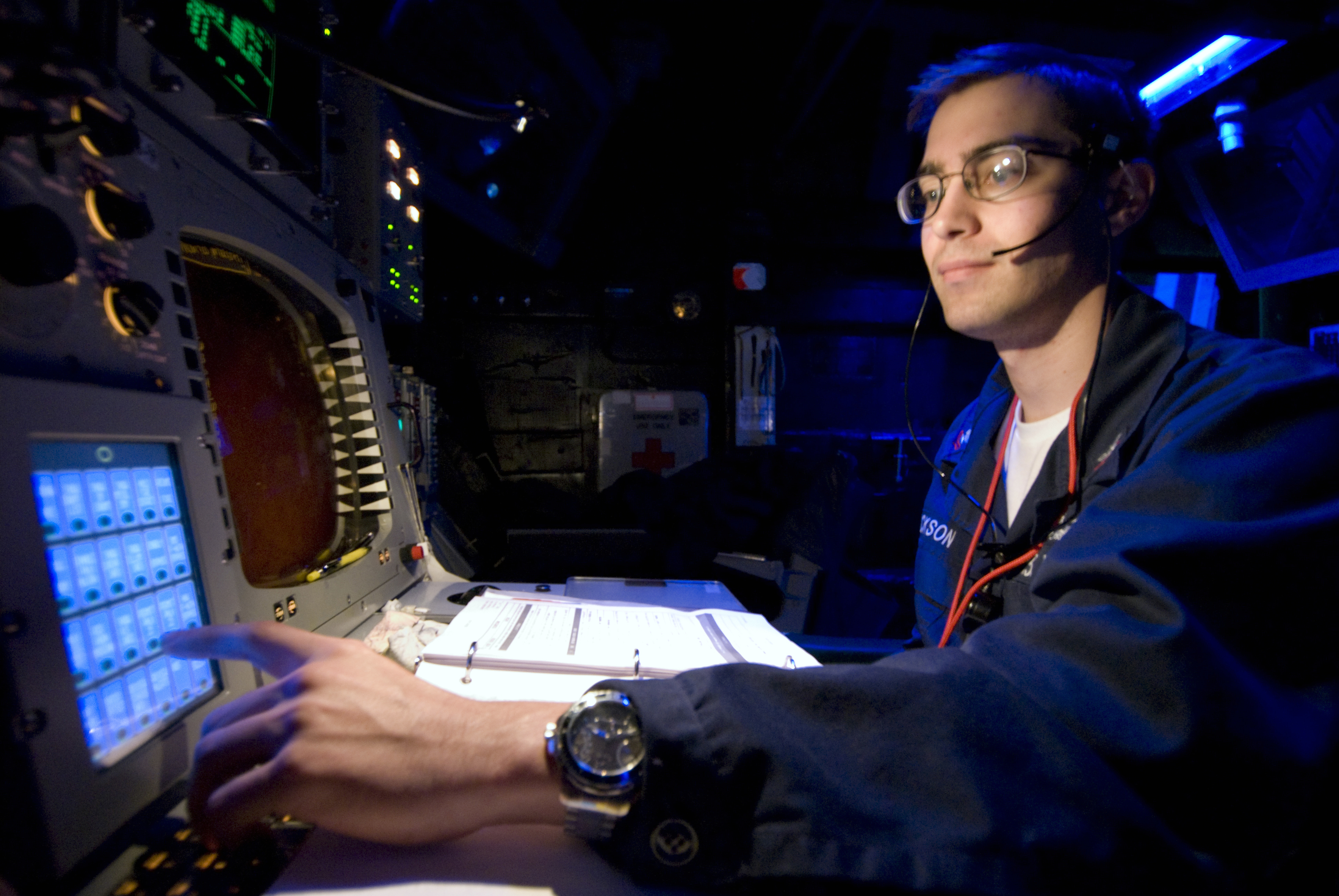
Fire Controlman 2nd Class Andrew Jackson launches the RIM-161 Standard missile 3 that destroyed USA-193, 20 February 2008

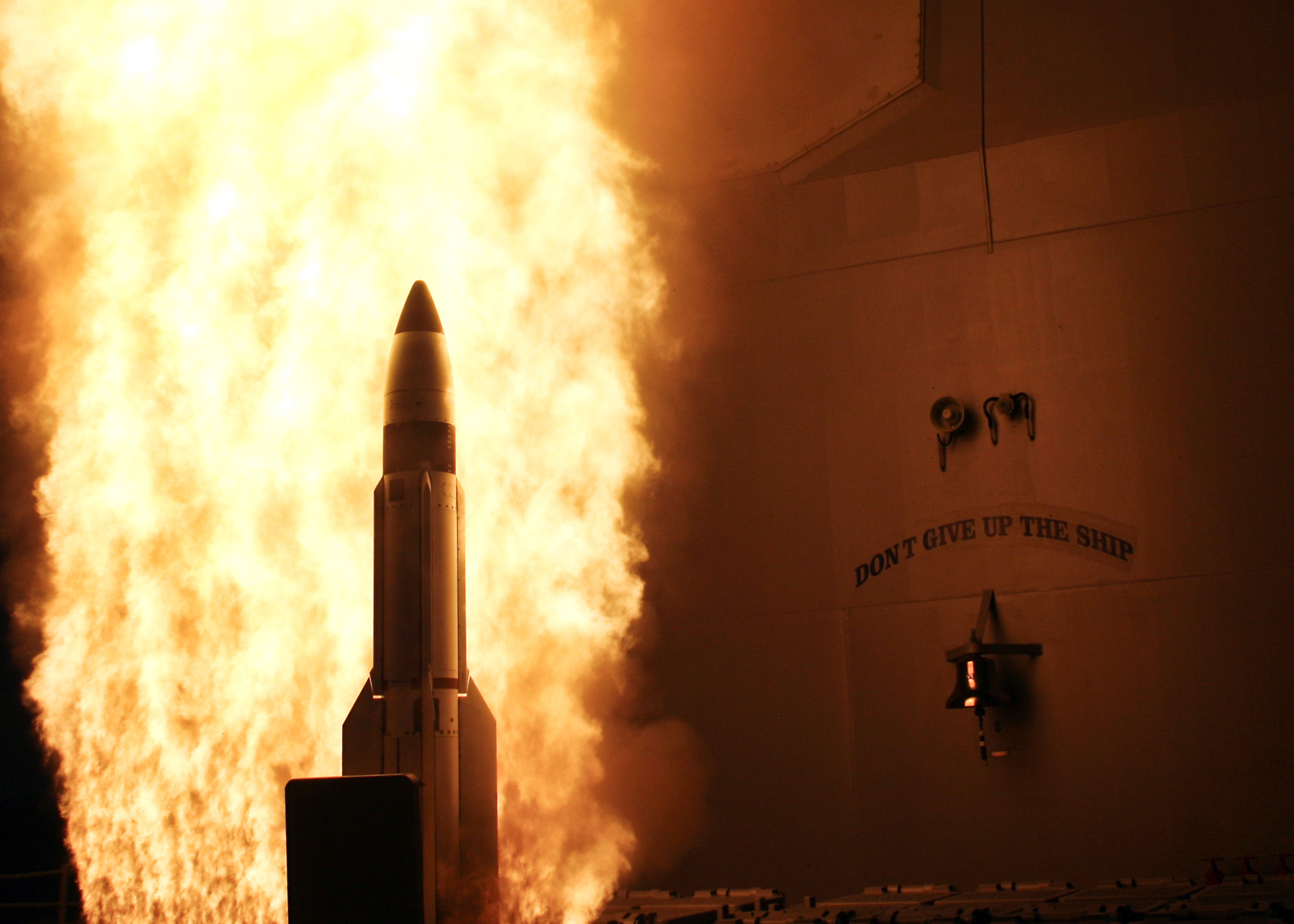
Missile launching from the USS Lake Erie, on 20 February 2008

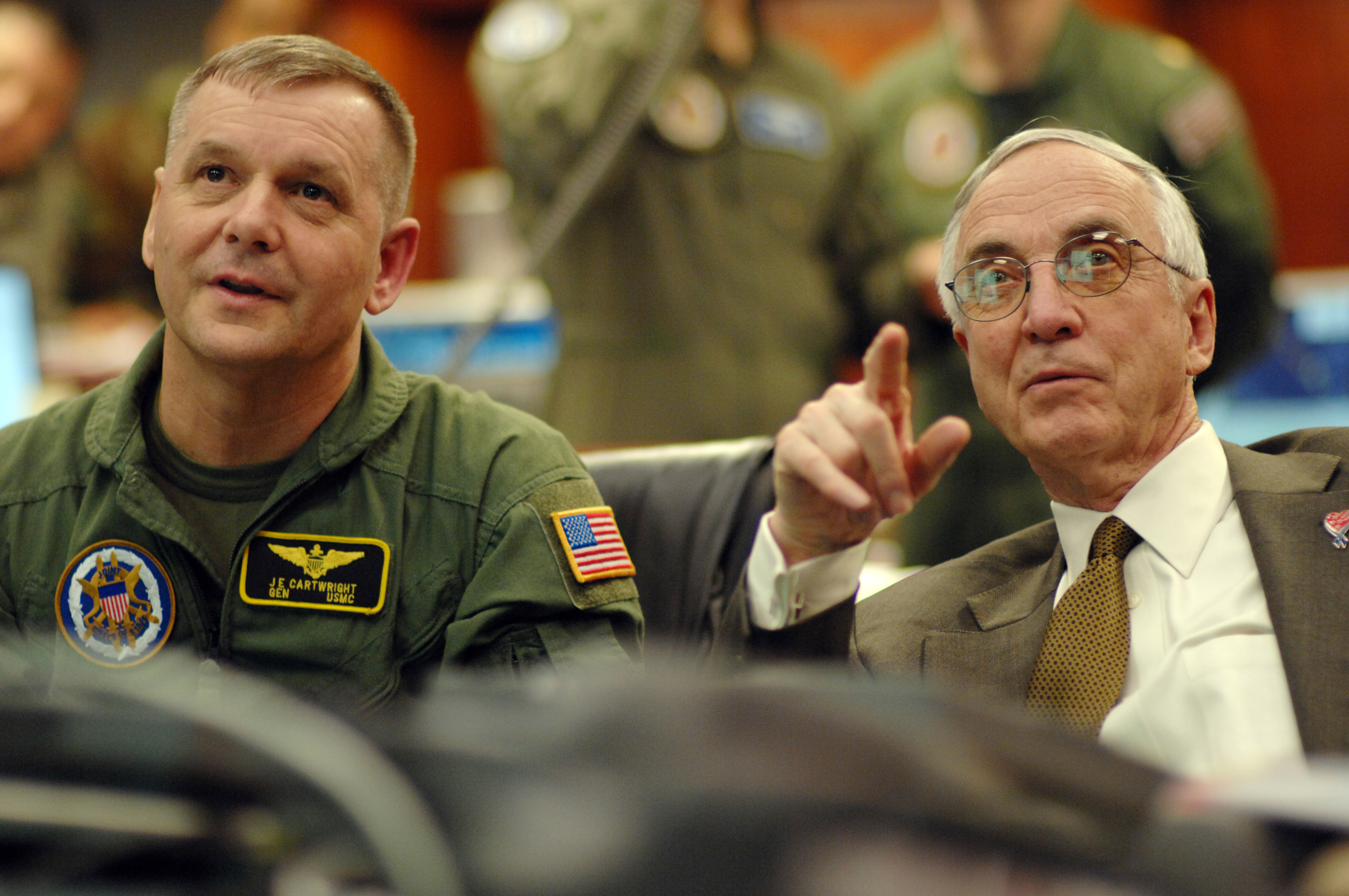
Vice Chairman of the Joint Chiefs of Staff U.S. Marine Gen. James E. Cartwright (left), and Deputy Defense Secretary Gordon R. England follow the progress of the Standard Missile-3.

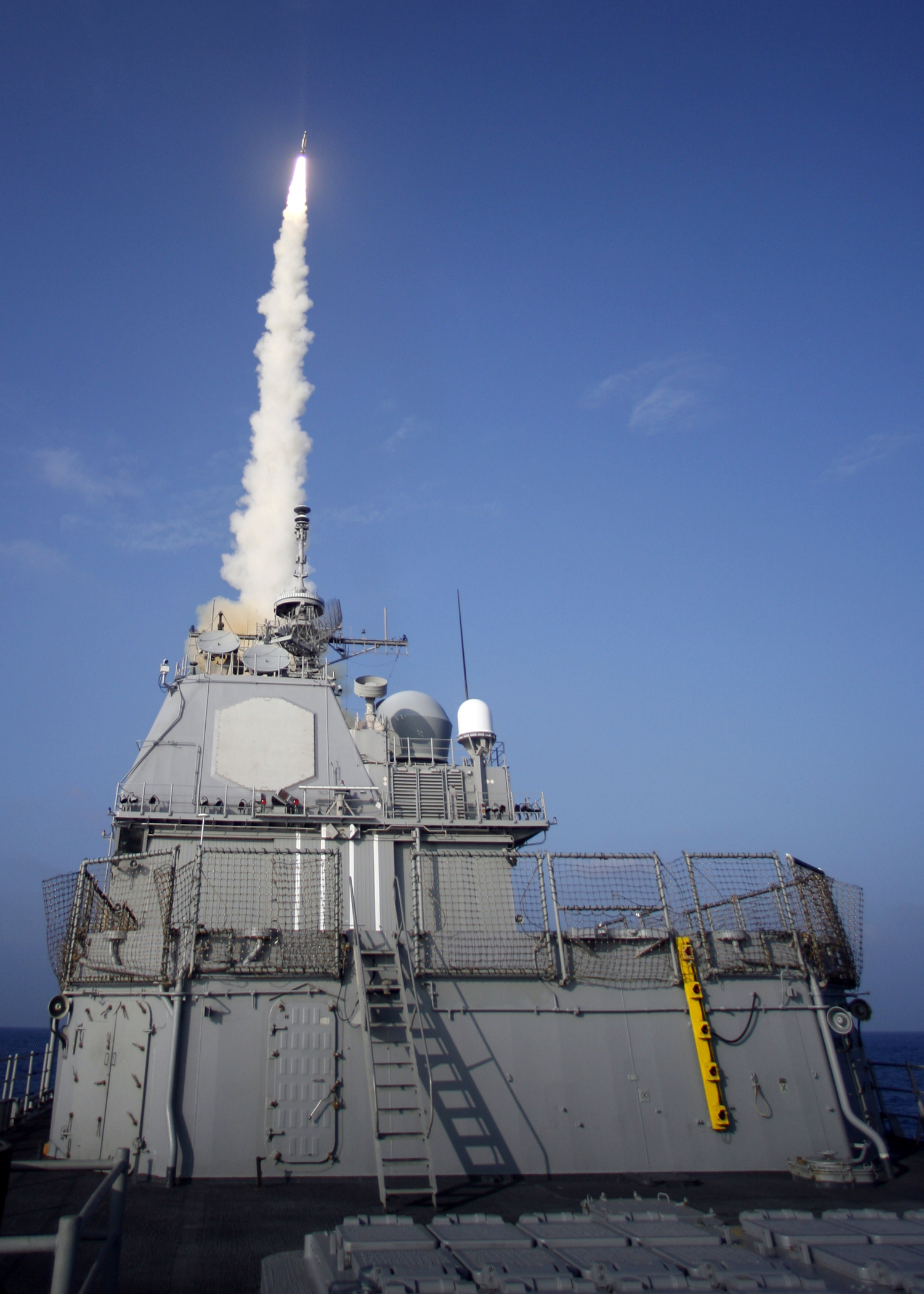
Missile launches off the USS Lake Erie.

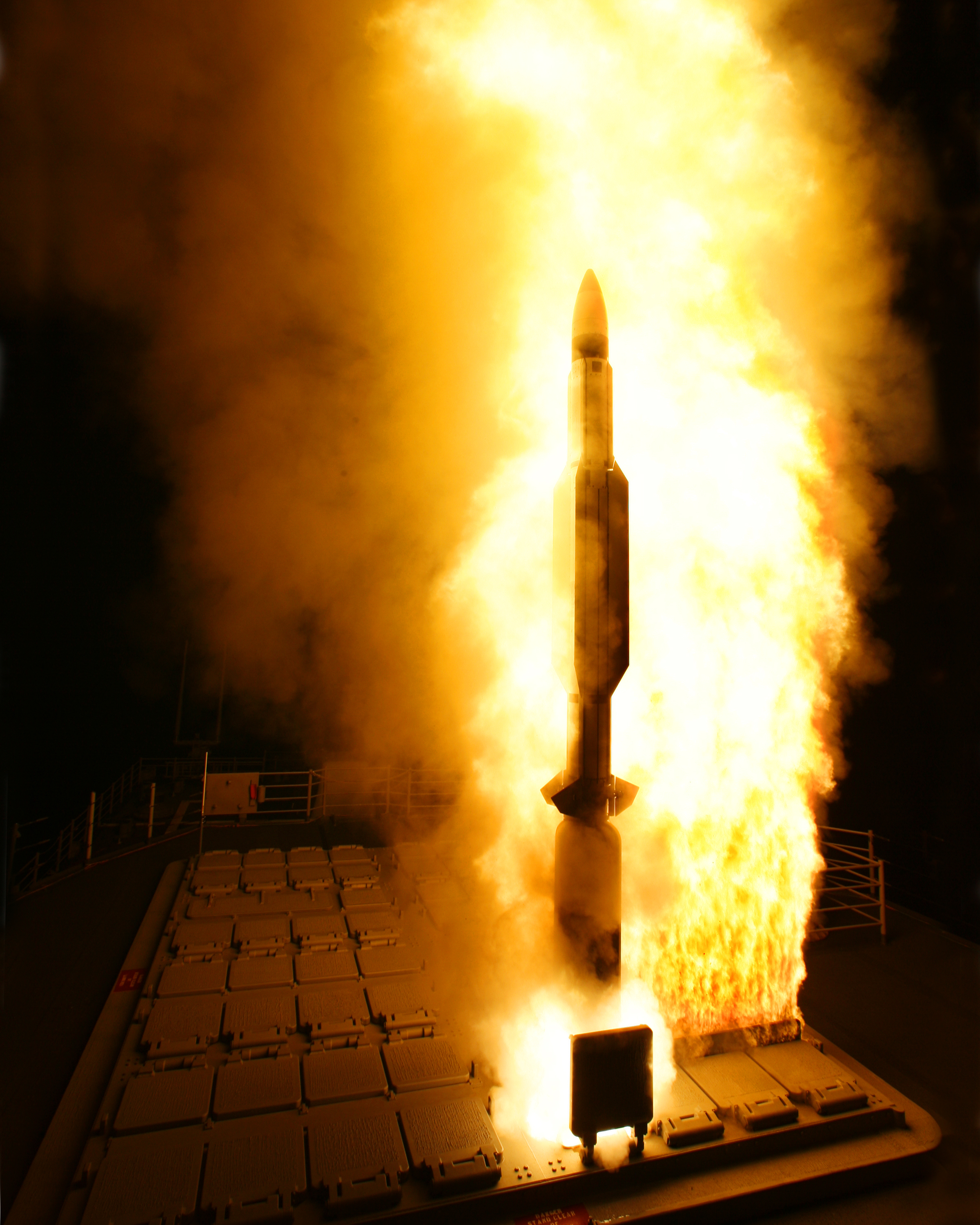
SM-3 before launching to destroy the NROL-21 satellite

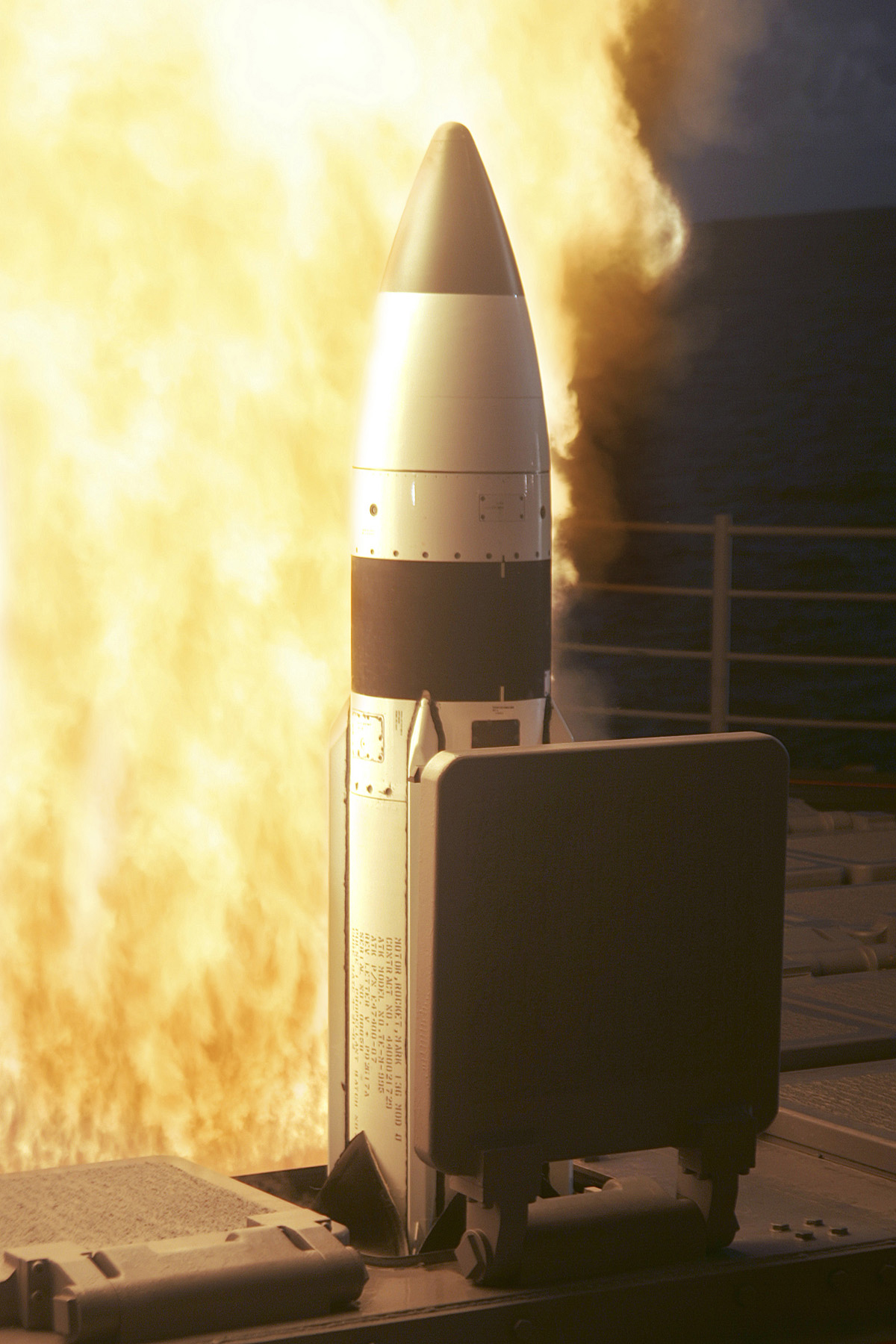
Closeup of SM-3 launching

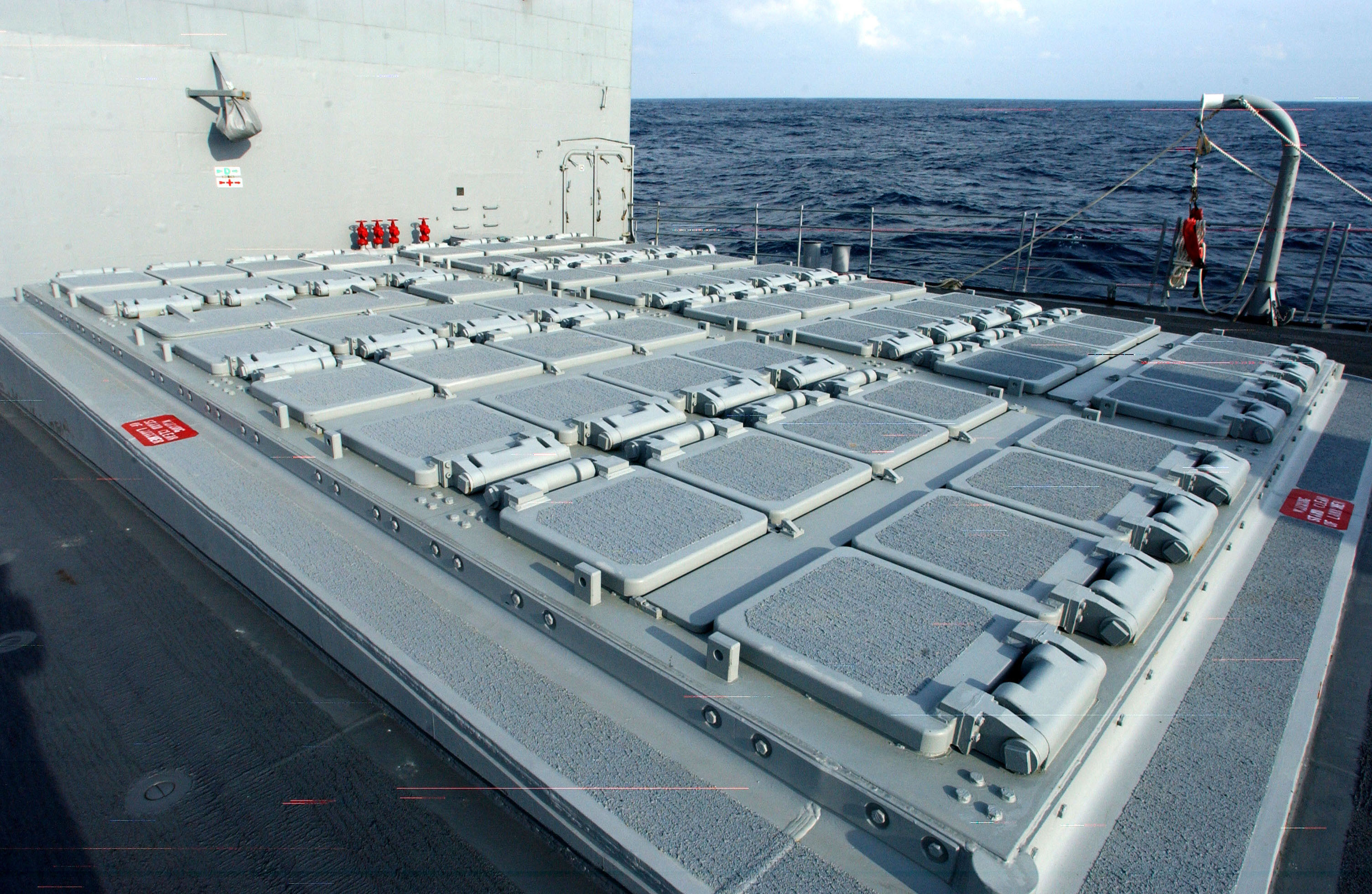
View of the vertical launching system on a Ticonderoga-class cruiser

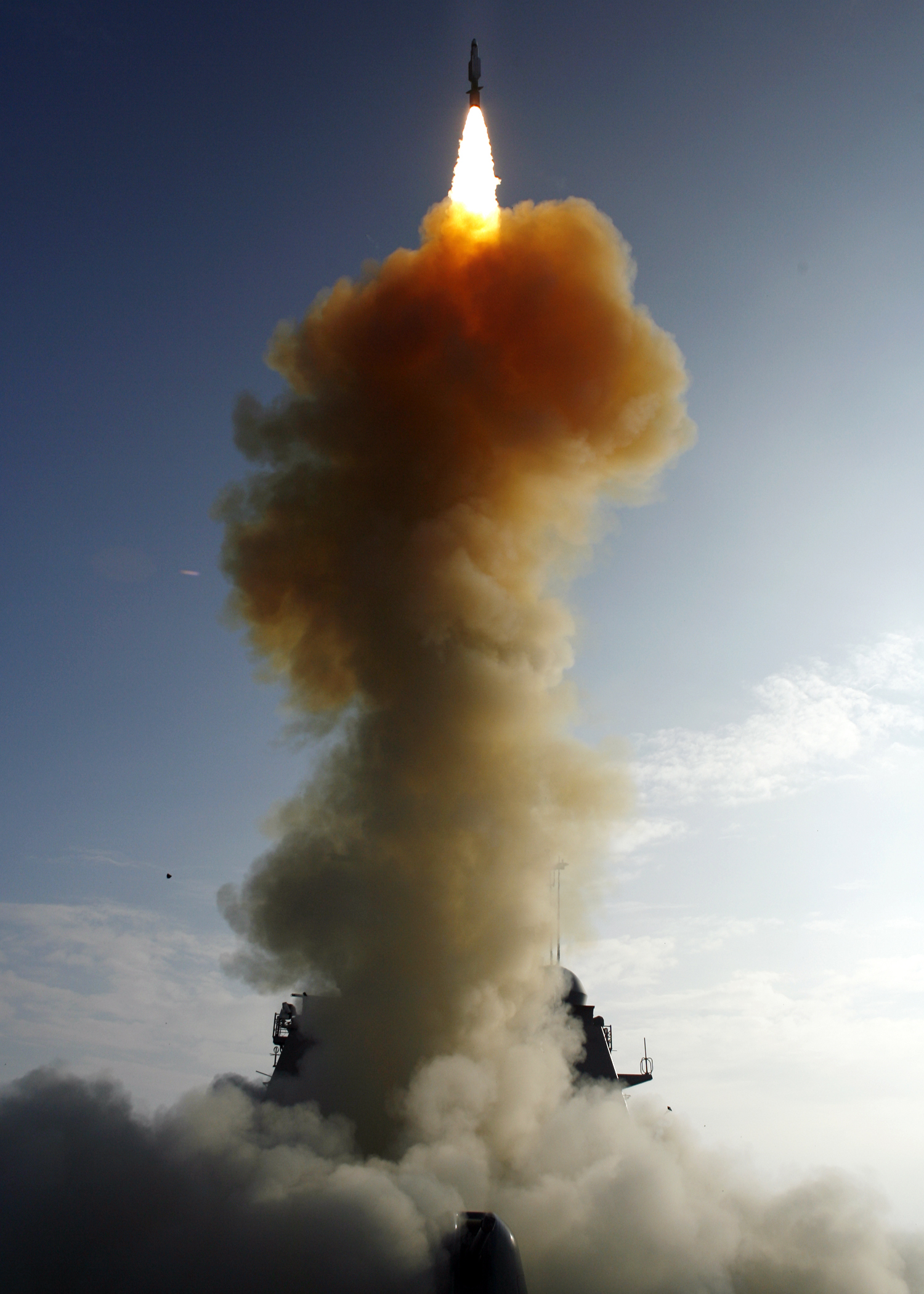
Launch of the SM-3 missile that intercepted USA-193

== See also ==
- P78-1, a U.S. satellite in a 470 km (290 mi) orbit that was destroyed during a 1985 U.S. Air Force ASM-135 ASAT test
- 2007 Chinese anti-satellite missile test
- Anti-satellite weapon
- Kill vehicle
- Space debris
- Space warfare
