= 2007 Chinese anti-satellite missile test =

Largest field of space debris in history

On 11 January 2007, China conducted an anti-satellite missile test. A Chinese weather satellite—the FY-1C (COSPAR 1999-025A) polar orbit satellite of the Fengyun series, at an altitude of 860 kilometres (530 mi), with a mass of 960 kilograms (2,120 lb)—was destroyed by a kinetic kill vehicle traveling with a speed of 8 km/s (18,000 mph) in the opposite direction (see Head-on engagement). It was launched with a multistage solid-fuel missile from Xichang Satellite Launch Center or nearby.

Aviation Week & Space Technology magazine first reported the test on 17 January 2007. The report was confirmed on 18 January 2007 by a United States National Security Council (NSC) spokesperson. The Chinese government did not publicly acknowledge that the test had occurred until 23 January 2007 when the Chinese Foreign Ministry issued a statement confirming the test. China claims it formally notified the US, Japan and other countries about the test in advance.

It was the first known successful satellite intercept test since September 1985, when the United States destroyed the Solwind P78-1 satellite with ASM-135 anti-satellite missile released by a F-15 Eagle flying at a speed of Mach 0.934 and an altitude of 38,100 ft (11.6 km). The satellite was orbiting at 345 miles (555 km).

The New York Times, The Washington Times and Jane's Intelligence Review reported that the Chinese test came after at least two direct ascent tests that intentionally did not result in an intercept, on 7 July 2005 and 6 February 2006.

A leaked classified diplomatic cable indicates that the same system was tested against a ballistic target in January 2010 in what the Chinese government publicly described as a test of "ground-based midcourse missile interception technology". That description also closely matches the Chinese government's description of another test in January 2013, which has led some analysts to conclude that it was yet another test of the same ASAT system, again against a ballistic target and not a satellite.

== Background ==
During the 1999 NATO bombing of Yugoslavia, the United States bombed the Chinese embassy in Belgrade. The US stated that the bombing was accidental. Chinese leadership believed that the US had intentionally bombed the embassy and viewed China as significantly lacking in leverage against the United States. Among other efforts to reduce its gap in leverage such as developing cyberwarfare capabilities, China began to develop its counterspace abilities.

In January 2001, a US congressionally mandated space commission headed by Donald Rumsfeld recommended that "the US government should vigorously pursue the capabilities called for in the National Space Policy to ensure that the president will have the option to deploy weapons in space to deter threats to, and, if necessary, defend against attacks on US interests." Moreover, the subsequent US withdrawal from the Anti-Ballistic Missile Treaty in 2002 allowed the United States to pursue missile defenses, including those that were space-based.

In response to the actions by the US towards potential space weaponization, the Chinese started developing their own anti-satellite missiles. The 2007 test was part of a broader approach of strategic substitution to develop leverage from "information age weapons" instead of nuclear weapons.

== Weaponry ==
The Chinese anti-satellite system was named by Lieutenant General Michael Maples (then Director of US Defense Intelligence Agency), in a Senate Armed Services Committee Hearing, as the SC-19. The SC-19 has been described as being based on a modified DF-21 ballistic missile with a Kinetic Kill Vehicle mounted. The ASAT kill vehicle relies on an imaging infrared seeker and also has been described as a modified HQ-19 with a KT-1 rocket booster. The program is said to have been at least partially funded by China's 863 Program (specifically, the 863-409 focus area).

The closing velocity of the intercept was approximately 8 kilometers per second (17,900 mph), comparable to the American National Missile Defense system.

== Aftermath ==
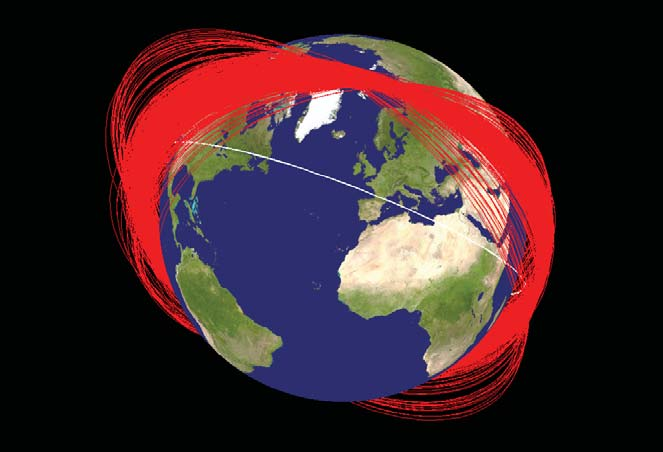
Known orbit planes of Fengyun-1C debris one month after its disintegration by the Chinese ASAT (orbits exaggerated for visibility)

=== Political reactions ===
Several nations responded negatively to the test and highlighted the serious consequences of engaging in the militarisation of space. Chinese Foreign Ministry spokesman Liu Jianchao stated, "There's no need to feel threatened about this" and argued that "China will not participate in any kind of arms race in outer space." China had publicly been advocating to ban space weapons, which had been rejected by the United States under George W. Bush because of certain loopholes in the treaty.

The United States had not tested an anti-satellite weapon since 1985. In February 2008, the US launched its own strike to destroy a non-functioning US satellite, which demonstrated the capability to strike in space, though at a much lower altitude than the Chinese test. The US claimed that the strike was not a military test but a necessary mission to remove the threat posed by the decaying orbit of a faulty spy satellite with a full tank of hydrazine fuel.

In early 2013, the Russian concept satellite BLITS collided with what is believed to be a piece of debris from Fengyun-1C, was knocked out of its orbit and soon afterwards data retrieval from the satellite ceased.

=== Space debris tracking ===
Anti-satellite missile tests, especially ones involving kinetic kill vehicles as in this case, contribute to the formation of orbital space debris which can remain in orbit for many years and could interfere with future space activity (Kessler syndrome). The 2007 Chinese ASAT test created the largest field of space debris in history, with more than 3,000 pieces of trackable size (golf ball size and larger) officially catalogued in the immediate aftermath, and an estimated 150,000 debris particles. As of October 2016, a total of 3,438 pieces of debris had been detected, with 571 decayed and 2,867 still in orbit nine years after the incident.

More than half of the tracked debris orbits the Earth with a mean altitude above 850 kilometres (530 mi), so they would likely remain in orbit for decades or centuries. Based on 2009 and 2013 calculations of solar flux, the NASA Orbital Debris Program Office estimated that around 30% of the larger-than-10-centimeter (3.9 in) debris would still be in orbit in 2035.

In April 2011, debris from the Chinese test passed 6 kilometres (3.7 mi) away from the International Space Station.

As of April 2019, 3000 of the 10,000 pieces of space debris routinely tracked by the US military as a threat to the International Space Station were known to have originated from the 2007 satellite shoot down.

== Response ==
=== Official responses ===
- Australia – Foreign Minister Alexander Downer said he did not want to see "some sort of spread, if you like, of an arms race into outer space".
- Japan – Prime Minister Shinzo Abe said that nations "must use space peacefully."
- Russia – Defence Minister Sergei Ivanov, stated that he considers reports on the Chinese anti-satellite missile test "exaggerated and abstract", reminding at the same time, that Russia always was against the militarisation of space.
- United Kingdom – A spokesman for the Prime Minister Tony Blair told reporters that British officials had raised the matter with China. "We are concerned about the impact of debris in space and we expressed that concern," he said. However he also said that "We don't believe that this does contravene international law".
- United States – National Security Council spokesman Gordon Johndroe, who confirmed that the test had occurred, stated that the United States "believes China's development and testing of such weapons is inconsistent with the spirit of cooperation that both countries aspire to in the civil space area."

=== Unofficial or indirectly related responses ===
Desmond Ball of the Australian National University while commenting on China's anti-satellite (ASAT) test of January 2007 said: “China's ASAT test of 11 January involved a fairly primitive system, limited to high-inclination LEO satellites. It is the sort of capability available to any country with a store of MRBMs/IRBMs or satellite launch vehicles, and a long-range radar system, such as Japan, India, Iran and even North Korea. However, its LEO coverage does include some extremely valuable satellites, including imaging and ELINT satellites, and the test is likely to generate reactions in several countries”.

=== Related treaties ===
The Outer Space Treaty banned weapons of mass destruction in orbit and outer space but does not ban conventional weaponry in orbit. It is ratified by 98 countries, including China, and signed by 27 others.

== See also ==
- Anti-satellite weapon
- ASAT program of China
- BLITS
- Kill vehicle
- Militarisation of space
- Space debris
- Space weapon
- Space warfare
- Kessler Syndrome
- Dong Neng-2
- China's military expenditure
- ASM-135 ASAT (first known successful anti-satellite weapon test)
- Operation Burnt Frost
- Mission Shakti
