= USS Lake Erie (CG-70) =

Ticonderoga-class cruiser

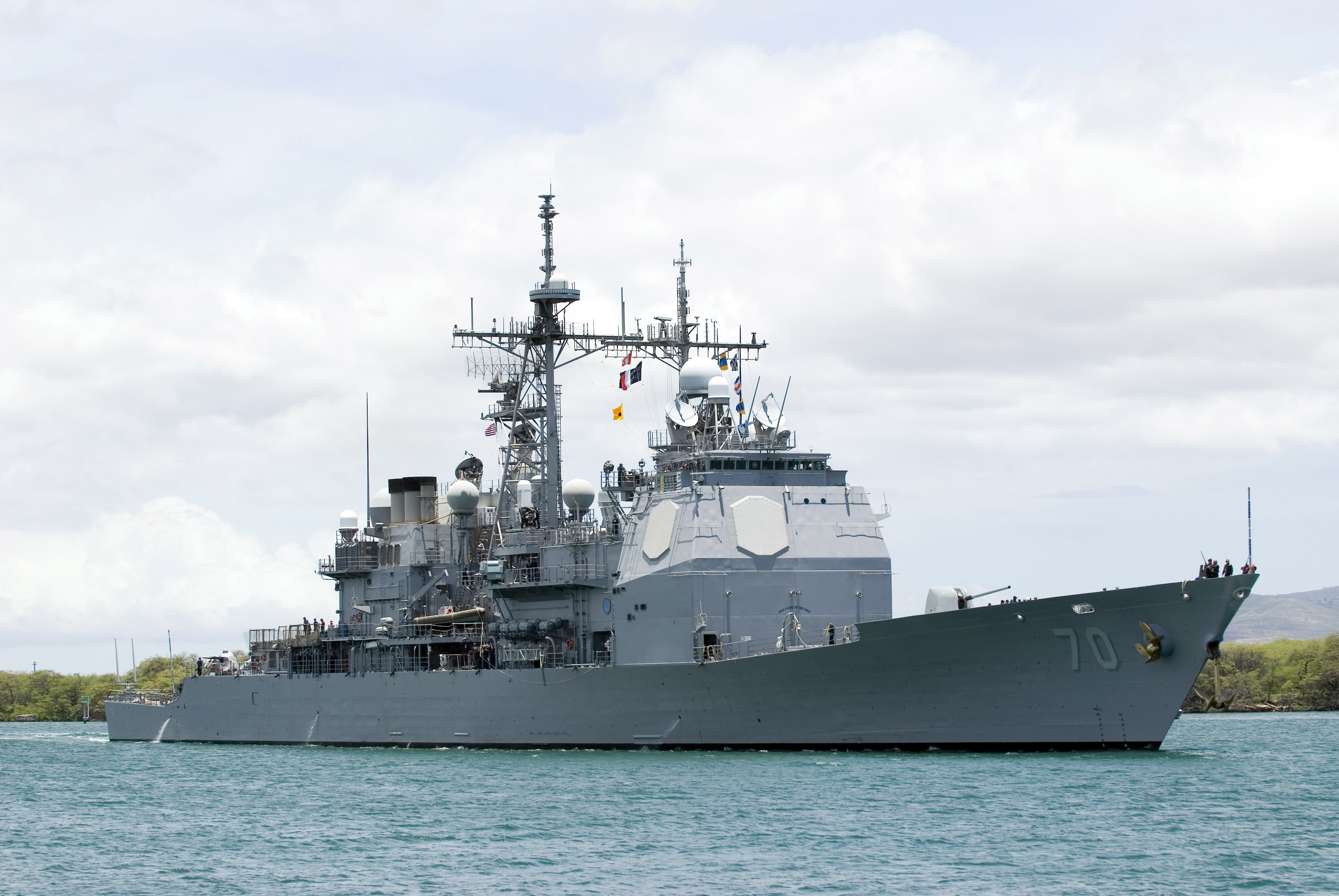
- USS Lake Erie (CG-70)

History

United States
- Name: Lake Erie
- Namesake: Battle of Lake Erie
- Awarded: 25 February 1988
- Builder: Bath Iron Works
- Laid down: 6 March 1990
- Launched: 13 July 1991
- Acquired: 12 March 1993
- Commissioned: 24 July 1993
- Decommissioned: 25 September 2026
- Home port: San Diego
- Identification: MMSI number: 366967000; Call sign: NCDP; Hull number: CG-70
- Motto: Courage, Determination, Peace
- Honors and awards: Battle Effectiveness Award – 2004, 2005, 2006, 2007, 2008, 2023
- Status: Decommissioned 25 September 2026
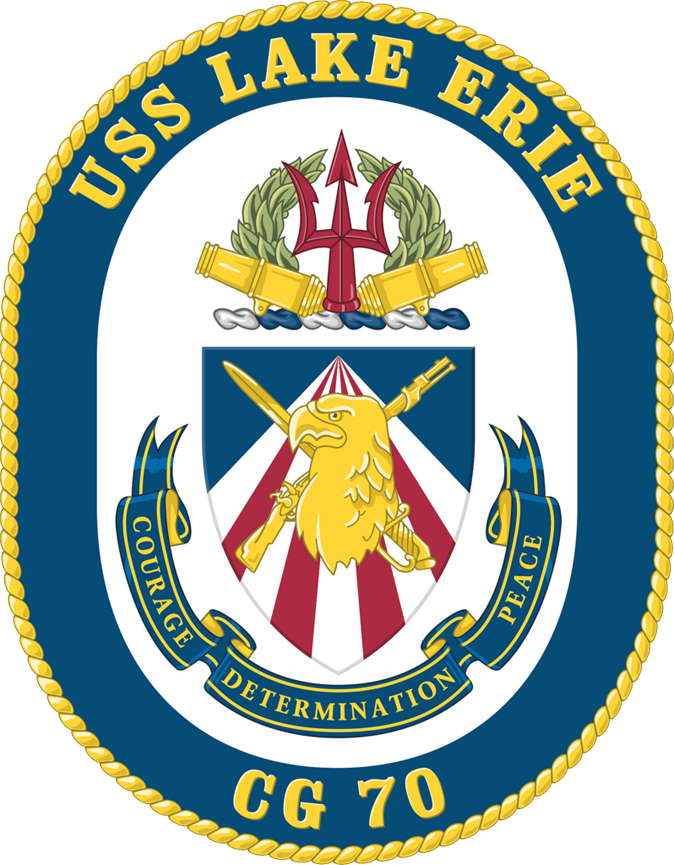
- Badge

General characteristics
- Class & type: Ticonderoga-class cruiser
- Displacement: Approx. 9,600 long tons (9,800 t) full load
- Length: 567 feet (173 m)
- Beam: 55 feet (16.8 meters)
- Draft: 34 feet (10.2 meters)
- Propulsion: 4 × General Electric LM2500 gas turbine engines; 2 × controllable-reversible pitch propellers; 2 × rudders
- Speed: 32.5 knots (60 km/h; 37.4 mph)
- Complement: 30 officers and 300 enlisted
- Sensors & processing systems: AN/SPY-1A/B multi-function radar; AN/SPS-49 air search radar (Removed on some ships); AN/SPG-62 fire control radar; AN/SPS-73 surface search radar; AN/SPQ-9 gun fire control radar; AN/SQQ-89(V)1/3 - A(V)15 Sonar suite, consisting of: AN/SQS-53B/C/D active sonar; AN/SQR-19 TACTAS, AN/SQR-19B ITASS, & MFTA passive sonar; AN/SQQ-28 light airborne multi-purpose system
- Armament: 2 × 61 cell Mk 41 vertical launch systems containing; 122 × mix of: RIM-66M-5 Standard SM-2MR Block IIIB; RIM-156A SM-2ER Block IV; RIM-161 SM-3; RIM-162A ESSM; RIM-174A Standard ERAM; BGM-109 Tomahawk; RUM-139A VL-ASROC; 8 × RGM-84 Harpoon missiles; 2 × 5 in (127 mm)/62 caliber Mark 45 Mod 4 lightweight gun; 2 × Mk 38 25 mm Machine Gun Systems; 2–4 × .50 in (12.7 mm) cal. machine gun; 2 × Phalanx CIWS Block 1B; 2 × Mk 32 12.75 in (324 mm) triple torpedo tubes
- Aircraft carried: 2 × MH-60R Seahawk LAMPS Mk III helicopters.

USS Lake Erie (CG-70) was a Ticonderoga-class guided missile cruiser of the United States Navy, commissioned in 1993. She was named after the U.S. Navy's decisive victory in the Battle of Lake Erie during the War of 1812. The cruiser was the first U.S. Navy ship to be commissioned in Hawaii. The ship was decommissioned in 2026.

== History ==
Lake Erie was built by Bath Iron Works in Bath, Maine. Her keel was laid on 6 March 1990 and she was launched on 13 July 1991. Upon completion of her sea-trials after construction, Lake Erie transferred to the Pacific Fleet and was commissioned on 24 July 1993 as the twenty-fourth Ticonderoga-class guided missile cruiser in her homeport of Pearl Harbor, Hawaii. Lake Erie is a baseline 4 Ticonderoga-class ship, with integrated AN/UYK-43/44 computers (in place of UYK-7 and UYK-20) and superset computer programs originally developed for the Arleigh Burke-class guided missile destroyers. Lake Erie also has an improved UYS-20 data display system and various decision aids, as well as the SQS-53C sonar and the SQR-19 sonar data processor.

=== Service with the Constellation battle group ===
As part of a seven ship battle group, led by the aircraft carrier Constellation, Lake Erie entered the Persian Gulf 11 January 1995. Along with the Constellation battle group, Lake Erie deployed 10 November 1994 and spent most of December in the western Pacific. The arrival of Constellation and her escorts strengthened the U.S. presence in the Persian Gulf and supported U.N. initiatives in the region, including Operation Southern Watch. In March Lake Erie took part in a two-week, anti-submarine warfare (ASW) exercise in the Persian Gulf and Gulf of Oman 5 to 19 February to gather data and evaluate tactics to counter the growing threat of third-world diesel submarines. For purposes of the exercise the US submarine Topeka simulated a diesel submarine, while Lake Erie and Vandegrift rounded out the surface forces. The first week of the exercise took place in the southern Persian Gulf, while the second week was held outside the Strait of Hormuz in the Gulf of Oman. Lake Erie and the other ships of the Constellation battle group returned home in May.

During a deployment with the Constellation battle group in July 1997, Chosin turned over the duties of being regional Air Defense Commander to Lake Erie. In early August 1997 Lake Erie was involved in two major Theater Ballistic Missile Defense (TBMD) exercises in the Persian Gulf named Arabian Skies. During the exercises Constellation's battle group demonstrated a viable TBMD capability using the existing command and control architecture. Lake Erie then departed 5th Fleet's Area of Responsibility (AOR) 17 August 1997 on schedule to continue her routine six-month deployment in the waters of the Indian Ocean and Pacific Ocean. On 16 May 1998 Lake Erie returned to the Persian Gulf with elements of the Constellation battle group before she concluded her tour in the 5th Fleet with a joint-combined exercise with military forces from Pakistan. Dubbed "Inspired Siren 97-2" and "Inspired Alert 97-2," the exercises incorporated both surface combatants and air components, respectively. The purpose of this four-day training mission was to exercise the joint-combined naval and air capabilities of both countries, improve their respective levels of readiness and interoperability, and enhance military relations between the two nations.

=== Aegis Ballistic Missile Defense System testbed ===
In August 1998, as part of the Aegis Ballistic Missile Defense System, modifications were made aboard Lake Erie and Port Royal, which consisted of modifications to the Aegis weapons system on board Ticonderoga-class cruisers; a modification, known as Linebacker, and which uses specialized computing and radar software and hardware to provide improved tracking and reporting capabilities, and when coupled with the SM-2 Block IVA, intercept Tactical Ballistic Missiles (TBM). Ballistic missile testing afforded Port Royal and other participants an opportunity to flex the capabilities of the current Aegis weapon system against a live ballistic missile target and gave a representation of how the modified system tracks and destroys TBMs.

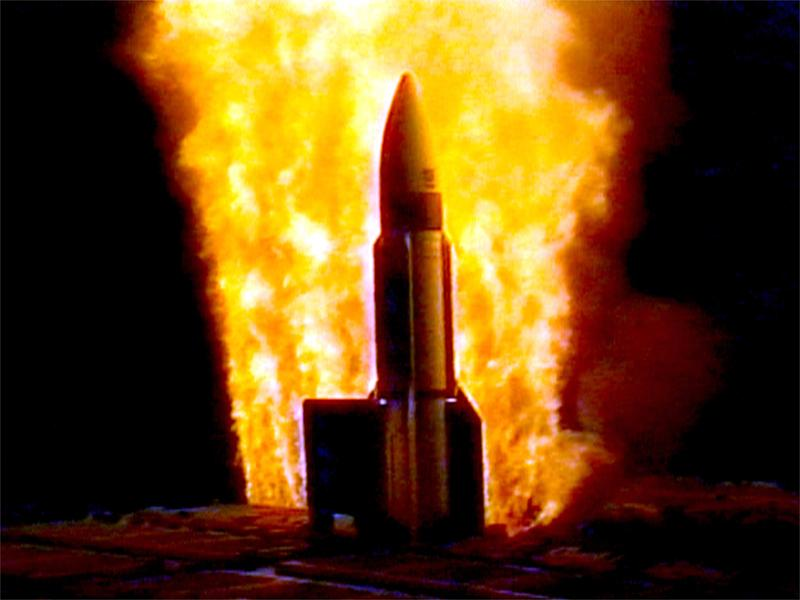
USS Lake Erie launches an anti-ballistic missile RIM-161 Standard Missile 3 off Kauaʻi, Hawaii (2001)

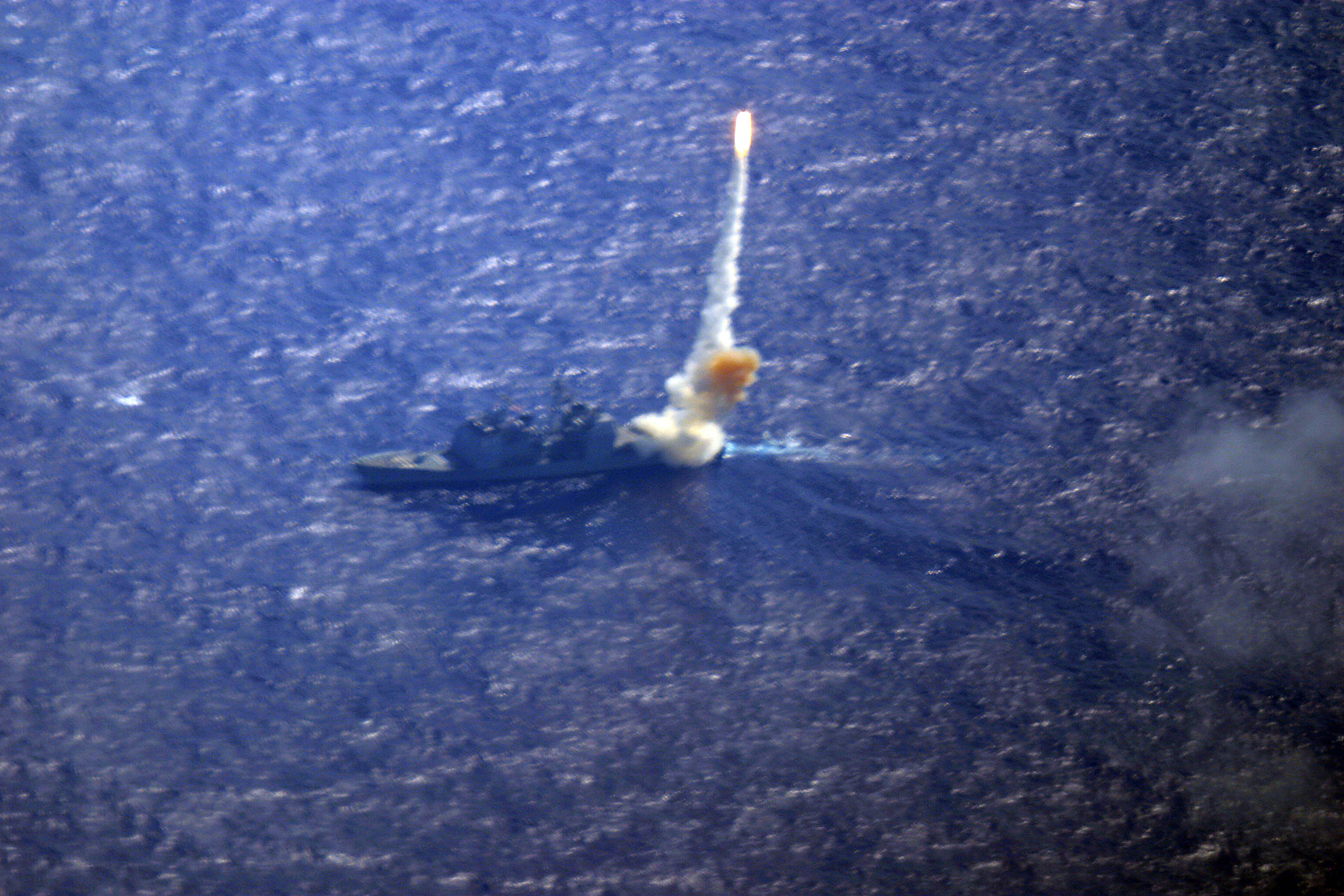
A RIM-161 Standard missile leaves the Lake Erie en route to intercept a short-range ballistic missile launched from Barking Sands Pacific Missile Range Facility, Kauai, Hawaii

Lake Erie and Port Royal were then to conduct at sea testing, develop core doctrine and tactics, and serve as focal points for putting the TBMD technology in the hands of the warfighters in the rest of the fleet. Sailors on board both ships were also to provide early feedback to the technical community and influence the final design of the TBMD system. Successful Linebacker sea trials at the Pacific Missile Range, Kauai, Hawaii took place in the fall of 1998.

On 17 December 1999, Lake Erie returned to her homeport at Naval Station Pearl Harbor after completing a six-month deployment to the western Pacific and Persian Gulf. The guided missile cruiser had once more deployed with the Constellation battle group.

In March 2000, the US Navy began ALI live fire tests and had successfully conducted the first Controlled Test Vehicle. Shiloh had conducted the first ALI live firing test in September 1999 and had successfully demonstrated the launch and flight sequence through third stage separation as well as verified flight stability at extreme altitude. Though the original plan had been to conduct all Flight Test Round shots from Shiloh, the need for further testing conflicted with her operational schedule. Therefore, it was decided by the Chief of Naval Operations to shift to Lake Erie to conduct the next firings in the ALI testing program. Lake Erie, already equipped with Area Linebacker modifications, was, as of 2 March 2000, receiving ALI equipment modifications in Pearl Harbor and was to conduct system checks and training to support the planned test firings.

In early July 2000, the US Navy announced that Lake Erie had been designated the Navy's theater-wide test ship for the AEGIS Lightweight Exoatmospheric Projectile intercept flight-test series. For the next two years, Lake Erie would be dedicated to conducting these critical tests. Lake Erie's home port in Pearl Harbor, Hawaii, made the ship's participation in tests at the Pacific Missile Range Facility off Kauai cost-effective with the Navy anticipating that the ship would not deploy operationally again for about two years.

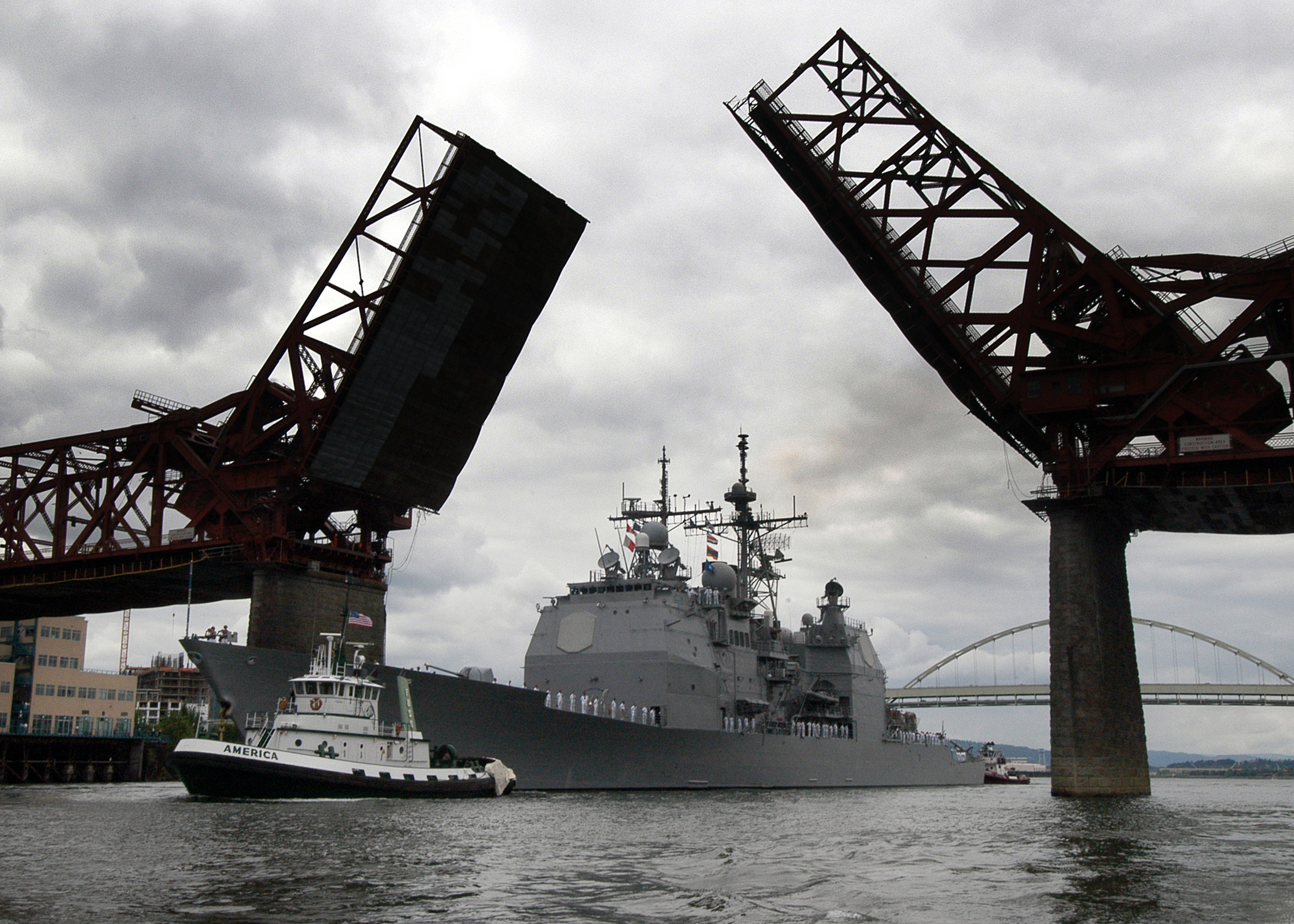
Lake Erie under tow passing under Broadway Bridge on the Willamette River en route to Portland, Oregon

In January 2001, Lake Erie conducted the Aegis Light Exo-Atmospheric Projectile (LEAP) Intercept Flight Test Round (FTR-1A) mission in the mid-Pacific using the Pacific Missile Range Facility, Kauai, Hawaii. Equipped with Aegis LEAP Intercept (ALI) computer programs and hardware, Lake Erie launched an SM-3 missile demonstrating third stage airframe stability and control through nominal kinetic warhead fourth stage separation. The SM-3 is the Navy's new exo-atmospheric missile developed to counter theater ballistic missile (TBM) threats outside the atmosphere.

On 9 February 2001 Lake Erie sortied from Pearl Harbor to assist along with Coast Guard boats and cutters with rescue efforts after the attack submarine Greeneville struck a Japanese fishing vessel while surfacing at approximately 1:45 pm (HST) about nine miles south of the Diamond Head crater off Honolulu, Hawaii. The fishing vessel, named Ehime Maru, rapidly flooded and sank within 10 minutes in 1,800 feet (550 m) of water. Twenty-six of 35 aboard were rescued. Ehime Maru had been on a fishing and research mission when Greeneville rapidly surfaced and collided with her stern. At the time of the accident, the Los Angeles-class submarine was conducting an "emergency ballast tank blow," a procedure used to bring subs to the surface in the event of an emergency. In this case it was used for training, on a one-day cruise with 16 military and civilian guests.

On 25 January 2002 the Missile Defense Agency and the Navy conducted a successful flight test in the continuing development of a Sea-Based Midcourse (SMD) Ballistic Missile Defense System (BMDS). Flight Mission-2 (FM-2) involved the launch of a developmental Standard Missile 3 (SM-3) and kinetic warhead (KW) interceptor from Lake Erie and an Aries target missile launched from the Pacific Missile Range Facility (PMRF) on the island of Kauai, Hawaii. The target was launched at 18:00 (EST) 26 January. About eight minutes later, Lake Erie, equipped with Aegis Lightweight Exo-atmospheric Projectile (LEAP) computer programs and equipment, and having tracked the target with the Aegis SPY-1 radar and developed a fire-control solution, launched the newly developed SM-3. The SM-3 acquired, tracked and diverted toward the target, demonstrating SM-3 fourth-stage Kinetic Warhead (KW) guidance, navigation and control. Although not a primary objective, during this early developmental test, the KW was aimed at the target, resulting in a hit-to-kill intercept at approximately 18:18 (EST).

The primary objective of this test was to evaluate SM-3 fourth-stage Kinetic Warhead guidance, navigation and control, with extensive engineering evaluation data collected for analyses in preparation for future flight tests. It was the fourth in a planned series of nine developmental test flights for the SMD program. The mission also included the first fully operational SM-3 with a live Solid Divert and Attitude Control System to steer the KW into the target.

=== Routine deployments ===
In March 2003 she was assigned to Cruiser-Destroyer Group One.

USS Lake Erie was featured in the 2011 naval thriller, Thunder in the Morning Calm, by Don Brown.

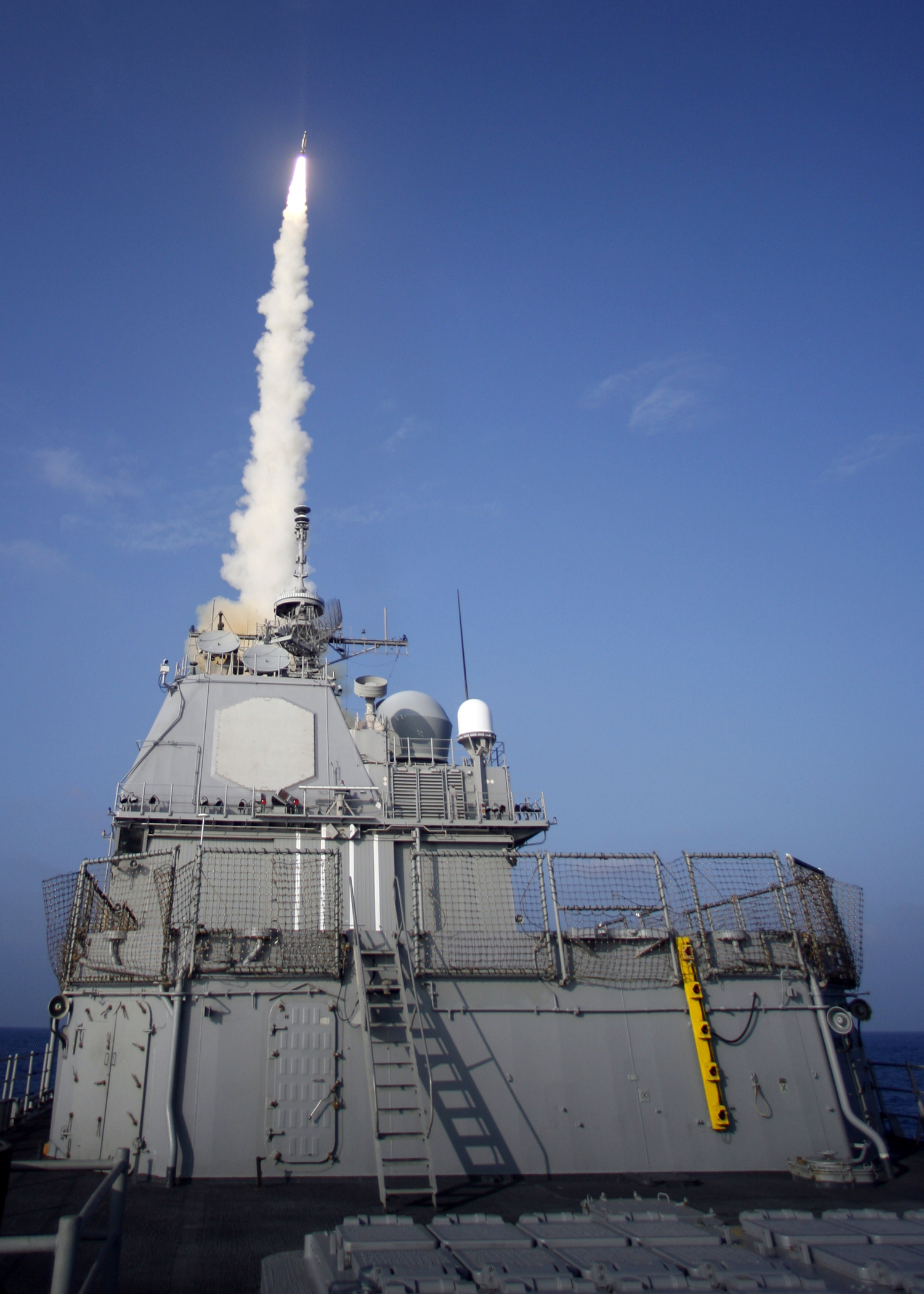
USS Lake Erie launches a missile during Operation Burn Frost

On 14 February 2008 the U.S. Department of Defense announced that as part of Operation Burnt Frost Lake Erie and two other ships would attempt to hit the failed satellite USA-193 in the north Pacific just prior to burn up during a period after 20 February using a modified SM-3 missile. On 21 February 2008, at approximately 3:30 UTC, the missile was fired and later confirmed to have struck the satellite. The military intended that the kinetic energy of the missile would rupture the hydrazine fuel tank allowing the toxic fuel to be consumed during re-entry.

In August 2014, Lake Erie went to San Diego for an extended maintenance period. Lake Erie was expected to replace John Paul Jones as a rotational Ballistic Missile Defense (BMD) deployer after the maintenance period.

On 30 November 2017, Lake Erie arrived in Pearl Harbor following a seven-month deployment to the Indo-Asia-Pacific region and the Persian Gulf.

Lake Erie arrived in Panama on September 20th, 2025 on her way to joining the growing U.S. Navy presence in the Caribbean as part of President Donald Trump’s campaign to combat drug cartels.

The Navy announced in April 2026 that would be decommissioned. The ceremony was held on 25 September 2026 at Naval Base San Diego.

=== Awards ===
- Joint Meritorious Unit Citation
- Navy Unit Commendation x3
- Coast Guard Meritorious Unit Citation with operational 'O'
- Navy E Ribbon x7
- Armed Forces Expeditionary Medal x3
- Southwest Asia Service Medal
- CNO Afloat Safety Award (PACFLT) - (2008)
