= Dong Neng-2 =

Chinese anti-satellite missile

Dong Neng-2 (Chinese: 动能-2; lit. 'Kinetic Energy 2') is an anti-satellite missile of the People's Liberation Army, developed in the early 2010s. It is designed as a low-Earth orbit interceptor which destroys orbiting satellites by high speed kinetic impact.

== See also ==
- 2007 Chinese anti-satellite missile test
