= Operation Burnt Frost =

2008 military operation to destroy a non-functioning U.S. satellite

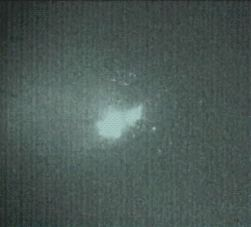
- Break up of USA-193 following interception
- Objective: Destruction of non-functioning satellite USA-193
- Date: 4 January – 21 February 2008
- Executed by: USS Lake Erie
- Outcome: Satellite destroyed on 21 February 2008

Operation Burnt Frost was a military operation to intercept and destroy non-functioning U.S. National Reconnaissance Office (NRO) satellite USA-193. The mission was described by the Missile Defense Agency as a "mission of safeguarding human life against the uncontrolled re-entry of a 5,000-pound satellite containing over 1,000 pounds of hazardous hydrazine propellant". The launch occurred on 21 February 2008 at approximately 10:26 p.m. EST from the cruiser USS Lake Erie, using a slightly modified Standard Missile-3 (SM-3) to shoot down the satellite. A few minutes after launch, the SM-3 intercepted its target and successfully completed its mission.

The operation was widely perceived as a destructive anti-satellite weapon test, and in response to the 2007 Chinese anti-satellite missile test. It received scrutiny from US analysts and other countries, mainly China and Russia. In 2022, the chair of the National Space Council, Kamala Harris, announced a unilateral moratorium on US direct-ascent (Note: This refers to anti-satellite missiles launched from Earth's surface or atmosphere. For anti-satellite weapons that are space-based, see Space warfare § Co-orbital.) destructive anti-satellite weapon tests.

== NRO satellite ==
USA-193, also known as NRO launch 21 (NROL-21 or simply L-21), was an American military reconnaissance satellite launched on December 14, 2006. The USA-193 was owned by the NRO and its precise function and purpose are classified. Several websites speculate that the satellite was probably a high-resolution radar satellite intended to produce images for the NRO. This argument is additionally supported by the fact that the satellite used a similar inclination to that of a Lacrosse Radar Satellite. Lacrosse is a terrestrial radar imaging reconnaissance satellite operated by the NRO. It utilizes a synthetic aperture radar (SAR) to acquire high resolution images regardless of cloud cover.

The satellite was launched from Vandenberg Air Force Base at 1 p.m. PST aboard the Delta II space launch system. This marked the first launch conducted by the United Launch Alliance since it assumed the program from Boeing Integrated Defense Systems on December 1, 2006. The successful launch represented a record 49 successful consecutive operational launches for the Defense Department.

While the launch was successful, ground controllers lost control over the USA-193 satellite shortly after it was established on its orbit, and were unable to regain control. The satellite itself posed minimal risk of falling and causing damage. The satellite's hydrazine was claimed to pose environmental risks due to its toxicity though no hydrazine pollution has ever been recorded due to a satellite reentry. In 2008, President George W. Bush determined that the satellite's fuel could potentially cause environmental damage if released, and asked the United States Strategic Command to destroy it.

== Timeline ==
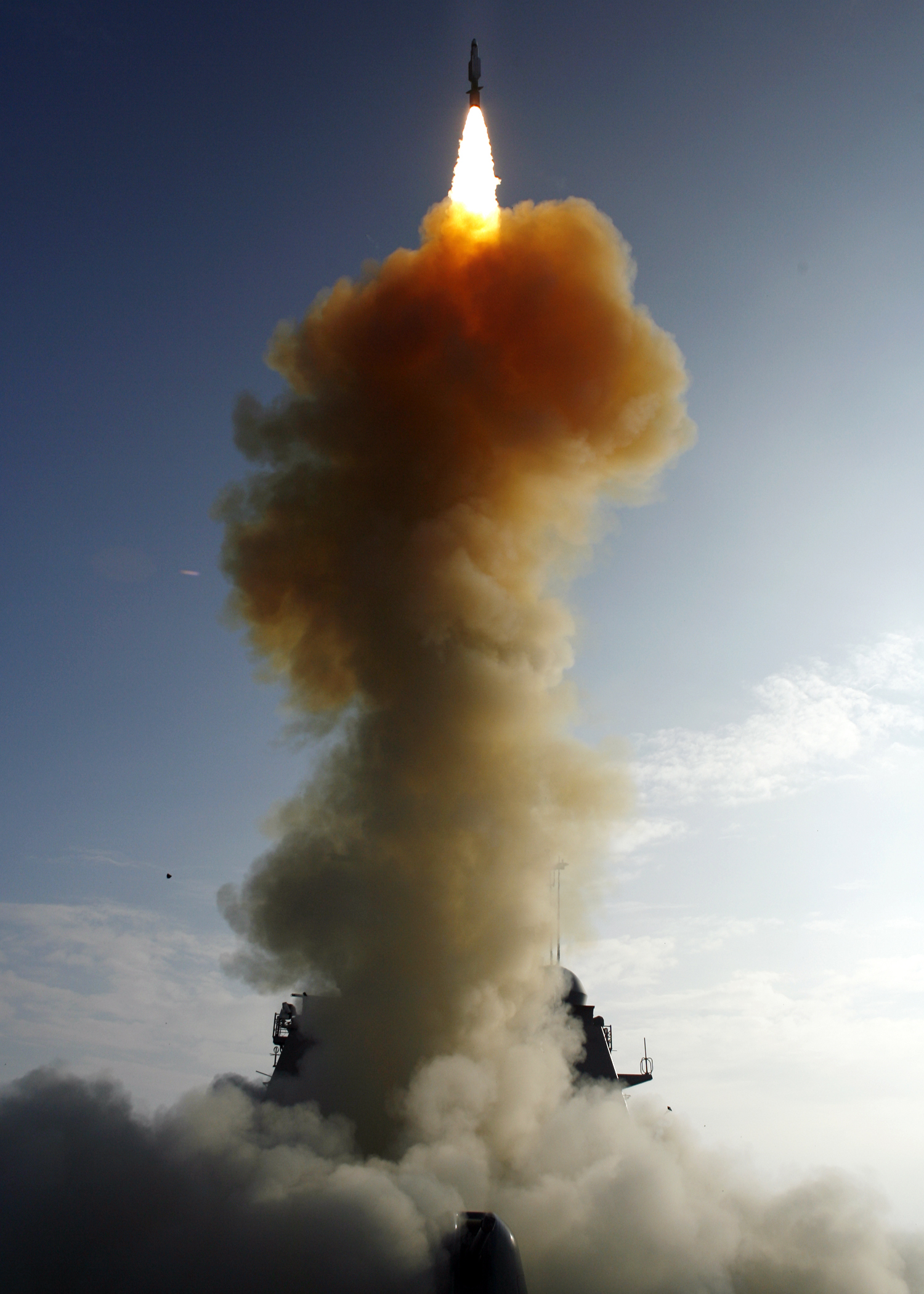
Launch of the SM-3 missile that intercepted USA-193 on 20 February 2008

From inception to the successful interception of the satellite, the timeline spanned only a matter of months.

Discussions around the possibility of destroying USA-193 began as early as December 2007. However, Operation Burnt Frost started on 4 January 2008, when President Bush ordered the military to destroy the satellite.

On 27 January 2008, information about the orbital decay of USA-193 was given to the media. Several of the initial reports projected that the satellite would return to Earth sometime in late February, early March. Additionally, these reports suggested that likely no action would need to be taken as the satellite or any debris would have a small chance of hitting any inhabited area. However, White House National Security Council spokesman Gordon Johndroe, did mention that the U.S. government was monitoring the satellite's decay and that it was examining different options to “mitigate any damage”. Also, four anonymous U.S. Officials did report that the satellite, which never became operational, would have toxic rocket fuel (hydrazine fuel) that could pose a danger if the tank did not explode on re-entry.

On 14 February 2008 General James Cartwright, the Vice Chairman of the Joint Chiefs of Staff, made a public announcement that the U.S. intended to shoot down USA-193. In this announcement he laid out several criteria into when, how and why the satellite would be shot down. The major objective was to reduce the risk to space, air and terrestrial platforms. He explained that they would wait for the shuttle to land, so the potential harm to the shuttle would not be a factor. Next they wanted to wait until the satellite was close to re-entry, this would limit the amount of space debris created. Finally, they did not want to let the satellite enter the Earth's atmosphere because of its non-aerodynamic characteristics, which would make it extremely hard to intercept. He suggested that these criteria gave them an eight-day window.

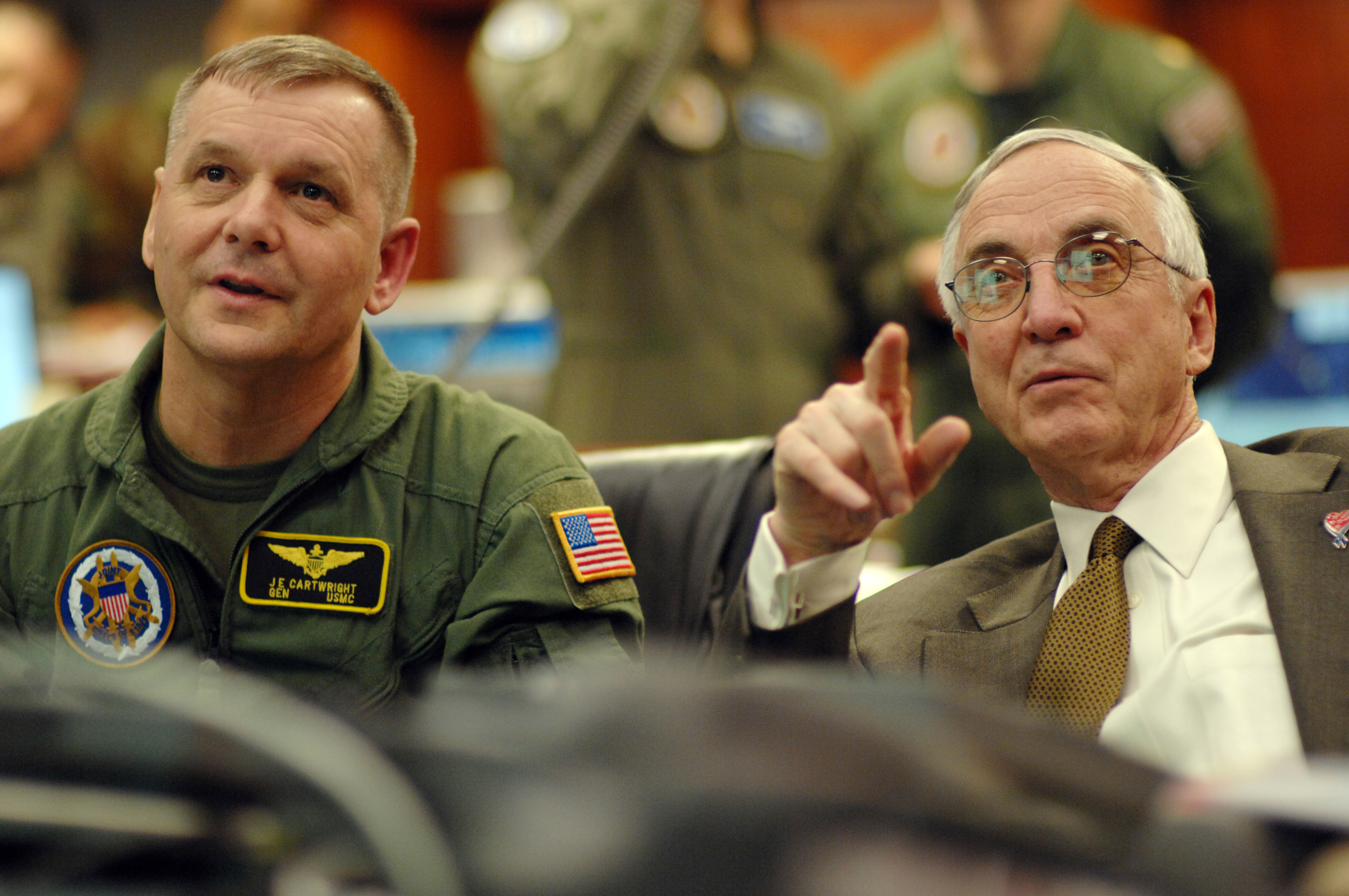
Vice Chairman of the Joint Chiefs of Staff U.S. Marine Gen. James E. Cartwright (left), and Deputy Defense Secretary Gordon R. England follow the progress of the SM-3

To meet the flexibility of this operation the government established that the U.S. Navy and the Aegis Ballistic Missile Defense (BMD) would be the best option. It had the ability to be a mobile asset and by utilizing the SM-3 (Standard Missile 3) it would have the ability to reach the necessary altitude. In addition the choice to use Aegis BMD was in large part due to its successful track record, in which 13 of 15 attempts to shoot down ballistic missiles were successful.

General Cartwright stated that if the satellite came down in one piece that nearly one half of the spacecraft would survive re-entry, which would spread the toxic cloud of hydrazine gas roughly over the size of two football fields. This potential risk seemed high enough to prompt the government and military to act as he stated “the regret factor of acting clearly outweighed the regret factor of not acting".

Days prior to the launch the cruiser USS Lake Erie (primary) and the destroyer USS Decatur (backup) sailed several hundred miles northwest of Hawaii to their rendezvous point. The Lake Erie was chosen because she was the U.S. Navy's most experienced ballistic-missile killer. The destroyer USS Russell was also a backup but remained in port at Pearl Harbor.

By 19 February 2008, the satellite had decayed down to a 244 km × 261 km orbit, an accelerating drop of approximately 10 km since the previous week.

Most of the 174 identified space debris reentered by end of June 2008

On 20 February 2008, at 1:00 p.m. EST Secretary of Defense Gates, with consultation of the White House, approved the mission. The launch happened at 10:26 p.m. EST and the collision with the satellite happened a few minutes later.

On 25 February 2008, the Department of Defense announced, based on debris analysis, that destruction of the hydrazine tank and reduction, if not elimination, of the risk to humans was achieved.

That test produced 174 pieces of orbital debris that were cataloged by the U.S. military. While most of the debris re-entered the Earth's atmosphere within a few months, two pieces lasted slightly longer because they were thrown into higher orbits. The final tracked piece of USA-193 debris (COSPAR 2006-057GH, SATCAT 35425) re-entered 20 months later on 28 October 2009.

== Aftermath ==
The operation was widely perceived as a kinetic anti-satellite weapon test, and received scrutiny from US analysts and other countries, mainly China and Russia.

Following the operation, China and Russia criticized the U.S. operation. The destruction of USA-193 came just weeks after Russia had drafted a new treaty to ban space weapons which was backed by China at a UN-sponsored forum. This treaty would ban the use of weapons against satellites or other spacecraft. This prompted the Russians to accuse the United States of using the hydrazine gas as a cover-up to test an anti-satellite (ASAT) weapon. They claimed that several countries’ satellites which used toxic fuel have crashed into the Earth in the past but never warranted such “extraordinary measures”. Furthering this notion, others have speculated that the toxic gas would have likely not survived re-entry regardless, and even if it had that the risk would be extremely small. These speculations have led many to believe that Operation Burnt Frost was in response to China's ASAT test on 11 January 2007 and to fear this would begin another "space race".

Unnamed U.S. officials continued to deny that the shooting down of the satellite was in response to China's ASAT test one year prior, or that they were trying to protect classified satellite technology. To promote transparency, the U.S. delegation to the Committee on the Peaceful Uses of Outer Space stated that after the operation concluded, the special modifications made to the two remaining missiles and three naval vessels were removed and that the United States "has no plans to adapt any technology from this extraordinary effort for use on any current or planned weapon system." U.S. officials pointed out that the U.S. had no reason to prove that it could shoot down a satellite, as the U.S. had already publicly done so in the 1980s. Another key difference pointed out by General Cartwright was that this intercept happened at a much lower altitude, whereas China's ASAT weapon destroyed a target at a much higher altitude, which resulted in the creation of debris which continues to pose a potential hazard to other spacecraft. Finally, U.S. officials again affirmed that the mission's intent was to preserve human life.

In 2022, the chair of the National Space Council, Kamala Harris, announced a unilateral moratorium on US direct-ascent destructive anti-satellite weapon tests.

== See also ==
- Anti-satellite weapon
- ASM-135 ASAT
- Bold Orion
- Militarisation of space
- Kessler Syndrome
