= BLITS =

Russian passive spherical reflector satellite

- An artist's impression of BLITS
- Mission type: Technology
- Operator: Roskosmos; ILRS network
- COSPAR ID: 2009-049G
- SATCAT no.: 35871
- Mission duration: Achieved: 3.5 years Planned: 5 years

Spacecraft properties
- Manufacturer: FSUE-IPIE
- Launch mass: 7.53 kilograms (16.6 lb)

Start of mission
- Launch date: 17 September 2009, 15:55:07 UTC
- Rocket: Soyuz-2-1b/Fregat
- Launch site: Baikonur Site 31/6

End of mission
- Last contact: March–April 2013

Orbital parameters
- Reference system: Geocentric
- Regime: Low Earth
- Semi-major axis: 7,197.67 kilometres (4,472.42 mi)
- Eccentricity: 0.0004373
- Perigee altitude: 823 kilometres (511 mi)
- Apogee altitude: 829 kilometres (515 mi)
- Inclination: 98.55 degrees
- Period: 101.28 minutes
- RAAN: 105.39 degrees
- Argument of perigee: 71.58 degrees
- Epoch: 25 February 2014, 08:51:29 UTC

BLITS (Ball Lens In The Space) is a Russian satellite launched on September 17, 2009, as a secondary payload on a Soyuz-2.1b/Fregat, from the Baikonur Cosmodrome in Kazakhstan. The satellite is totally passive and spherical, and is tracked using satellite laser ranging (SLR) by the International Laser Ranging Service. The design of BLITS is based on the optical Luneburg lens concept. The retroreflector is a multilayer glass sphere; it provides uniform reflection characteristics when viewed within a very wide range of angles, and can provide a cross-section sufficient for observations at low to medium orbit heights. A similar design was already tested on a smaller laser reflector carried on board of the METEOR-3M spacecraft launched on December 10, 2001.

The purpose of the mission was to validate the spherical glass retroreflector satellite concept and obtain SLR (Satellite Laser Ranging) data for solution of scientific problems in geophysics, geodynamics, and relativity. The BLITS allows millimeter and submillimeter accuracy SLR measurements, as its "target error" (uncertainty of reflection center relative to its center of mass) is less than 0.1 mm. An additional advantage is that the Earth's magnetic field does not affect the satellite orbit and spin parameters, unlike retroreflectors incorporated into active satellites. The BLITS allows the most accurate measurements of any SLR satellites, with the same accuracy level as a ground target.

The satellite was inserted into an 832 km (517 mi) Sun-synchronous orbit, with an inclination of 98.85º. The satellite was spinning at a spin period of 5.6 seconds around the axis normal to its orbit plane, allowing laser light to be reflected in short bursts because only half of the satellite is covered in a reflective coating. As the satellite is made of glass, minimal in-flight spin slowdown was expected since there were no conducting parts where currents interacting with the Earth magnetic field can be induced. The expected operative life was at least five years, but the mission was interrupted in 2013 after a collision with space debris.

== Structure ==
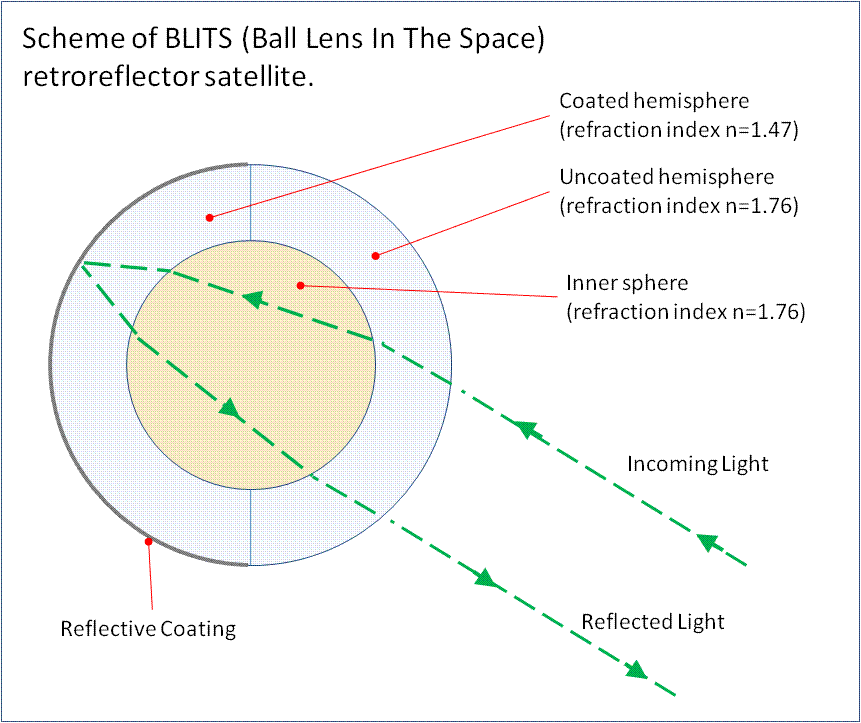
A scheme illustrating how the BLITS retroreflector works.

The satellite consists of two outer hemispheres (radius 85.16 mm or 3.353 in) made of a low-refraction-index glass (n = 1.47) and an inner ball lens (radius 53.52 mm or 2.107 in) made of a high-refraction-index glass (n = 1.76); the two outer hemispheres and the inner ball are glued together, and one of the outer hemispheres is externally coated with a reflective aluminum coating, covered with a protective varnish. The total mass is 7.53 kg (16.6 lb).

The satellite was designed for ranging with a green (532 nm) laser. When used for ranging, the phase center is 85.16 mm (3.353 in) behind the sphere center, with a range correction of +196.94 mm (7.754 in) taking into account the indices of refraction. A smaller spherical retroreflector of the same type but 6 cm in diameter was fastened to the Meteor-3M spacecraft and tested during its space flight of 2001–2006.

== Collision ==
In early 2013, the satellite was found to have a new orbit 120 m (390 ft) lower, a faster spin period of 2.1 seconds, and a different spin axis. The change was traced back to an event that occurred 22 Jan 2013 at 07:57 UTC; data from the United States's Space Surveillance Network showed that within 10 seconds of that time BLITS was close to the predicted path of a fragment of the former Chinese Fengyun-1C satellite, with a relative velocity of 9.6 km/s (6.0 mi/s) between them. The Chinese government destroyed the Fengyun-1C, at an altitude of 865 km (537 mi), on 11 Jan 2007 as a test of an anti-satellite missile, leaving 2,300 to 15,000 pieces of debris.

On January 28, 2013, the International Laser Ranging Service announced that a collision happened between BLITS and a space debris fragment. As a result, an abrupt change occurred of the BLITS orbit parameters (a decrease of the orbiting period), and the spin period changed from 5.6 s before collision to 2.1 s after collision. On April 19, 2013, BLITS mission contacts from the Scientific Research Institute for Precision Instrument Engineering in Moscow asked the ILRS to end tracking on the satellite, because its laser reflector cross section has significantly decreased after the collision, preventing its further use. According to the simulation by the Center for Space Standards & Innovation (CSSI), a research arm of Analytical Graphics, Inc. (AGI), BLITS could have been hit by a piece of debris originated by the 2007 Chinese anti-satellite missile test.

Last science data was returned from the satellite on 5 March 2013.

== New version ==
An improved version of the reflector, named BLITS-M, launched 26 December 2019 with a Gonets-M mission on a Rokot rocket. BLITS-M failed to separate from the upper stage; thus the mission was a failure.
