= NASA Orbital Debris Program Office =

Center for orbital debris research

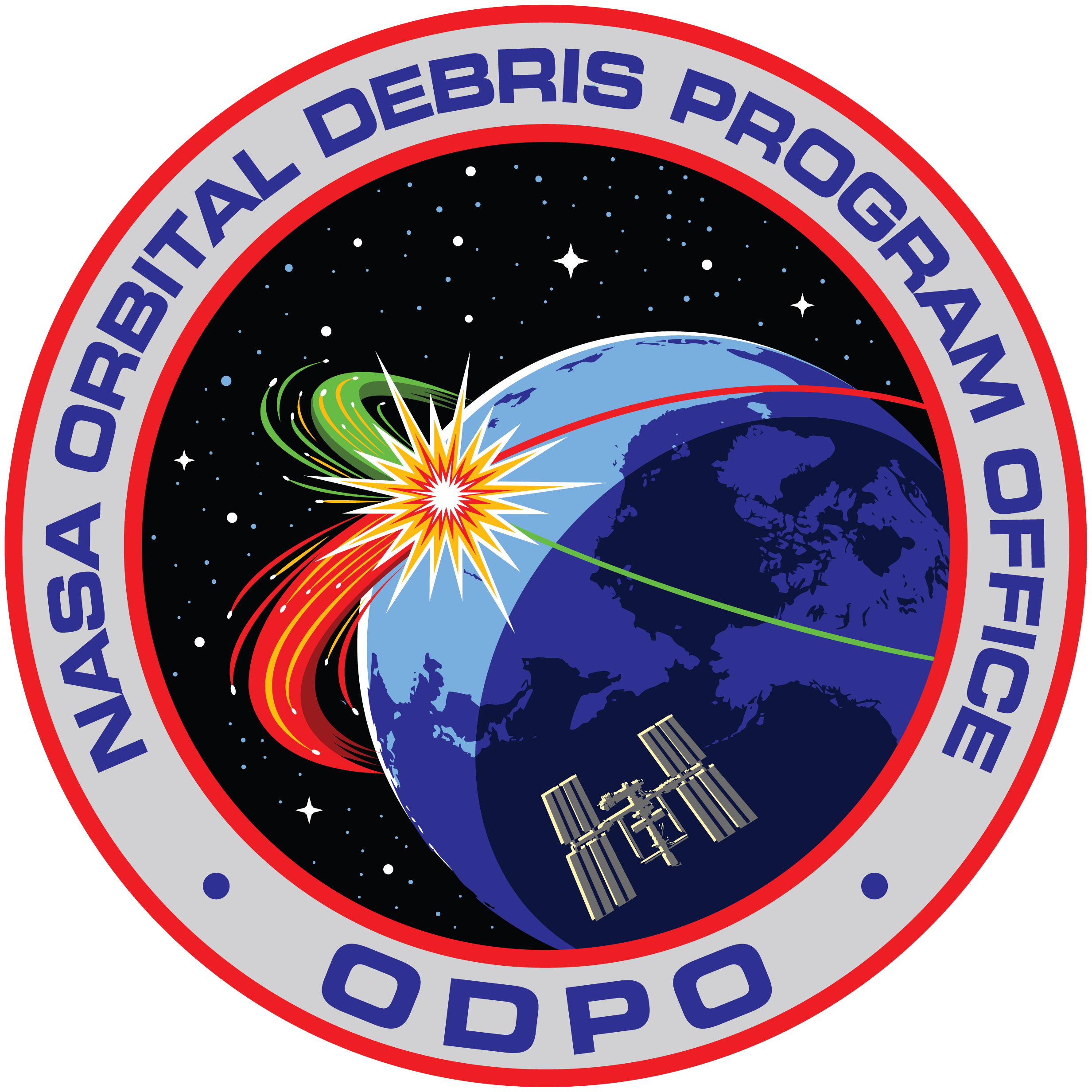
NASA Orbital Debris Program Office logo

The NASA Orbital Debris Program Office is located at the Johnson Space Center and is the lead NASA center for orbital debris research. It is recognized world-wide for its leadership in addressing orbital debris issues. The NASA Orbital Debris Program Office has taken the international lead in conducting measurements of the environment and in developing the technical consensus for adopting mitigation measures to protect users of the orbital environment. Work at the center continues with developing an improved understanding of the orbital debris environment and measures that can be taken to control its growth.

Orbital Debris research at NASA is divided into several broad research efforts, involving modeling, measurements, protection, mitigation and reentry of orbital debris.

== Modeling ==
NASA scientists continue to develop and upgrade orbital debris models to describe and characterize the current and future debris environment. Engineering models, such as ORDEM2000, can be used for debris impact risk assessments for spacecraft and satellites, including the International Space Station and the Space Shuttle. Evolutionary models, such as EVOLVE and LEGEND, are designed to predict the future debris environment. They are reliable tools to study how the future debris environment reacts to various mitigation practices.

ORDEM2000 was replaced in 2010 by ORDEM2010. This release represents a significant improvement in the NASA ODPO's empirically-based debris assessment modeling program. This version of the long-running series includes ten years of additional data, new validated high-fidelity environment models, new statistical processes for data and model analysis, the extension of the modeling through GEO, the inclusion of debris material density, and a new spacecraft-encompassing igloo analysis package, with an advanced companion GUI.

== Measurements ==
Measurements of near-Earth orbital debris are accomplished by conducting ground-based and space-based observations of the orbital debris environment. Data is acquired using ground-based radars and optical telescopes , space-based telescopes, and analysis of spacecraft surfaces returned from space. Some important data sources have been the U.S. Space Surveillance Network, the Haystack X-Band Radar, and returned surfaces from the Solar Max, Long Duration Exposure Facility (LDEF), and the Space Shuttle spacecraft. The data provide validation of the environment models and identify the presence of new sources.

== Protection ==
Orbital debris protection involves conducting hypervelocity impact measurements to assess the risk presented by orbital debris to operating spacecraft and developing new materials and new designs to provide better protection from the environment with less weight penalty. The data from this work provides the link between the environment defined by the models and the risk presented by that environment to operating spacecraft and provides recommendations on design and operations procedures to reduce the risk as required. These data also help in the analysis and interpretation of impact features on returned spacecraft surfaces. The primary facility for this research is the Hypervelocity Impact Technology Facility (HIT-F) at NASA JSC in Houston, although there are other facilities at JSC, New Mexico, and various DoD laboratories.

== Mitigation ==
Controlling the growth of the orbital debris population is a high priority for NASA, the United States, and the major space-faring nations of the world to preserve near-Earth space for future generations. Mitigation measures can take the form of curtailing or preventing the creation of new debris, designing satellites to withstand impacts by small debris, and implementing operational procedures ranging from utilizing orbital regimes with less debris, adopting specific spacecraft attitudes, and even maneuvering to avoid collisions with debris.

In 1995 NASA was the first space agency in the world to issue a comprehensive set of orbital debris mitigation guidelines. Two years later, the U.S. Government developed a set of Orbital Debris Mitigation Standard Practices, based on the NASA guidelines. Other countries and organizations, including Japan, France, Russia, and the European Space Agency (ESA), have followed suit with their own orbital debris mitigation guidelines. In 2002 after a multi-year effort, the Inter-Agency Space Debris Coordination Committee (IADC), comprising the space agencies of 10 countries as well as ESA, adopted a consensus set of guidelines designed to mitigate the growth of the orbital debris population. These guidelines were formally presented to the Scientific and Technical Subcommittee of the United Nations Committee on the Peaceful Uses of Outer Space in February 2003.

== Reentry ==
Because of the increasing number of objects in space, NASA has adopted guidelines and assessment procedures to reduce the number of non-operational spacecraft and spent rocket upper stages orbiting the Earth. One method of postmission disposal is to allow reentry of these spacecraft, either from orbital decay (uncontrolled entry) or with a controlled entry. Orbital decay may be achieved by firing engines to lower the perigee altitude so that atmospheric drag will eventually cause the spacecraft to enter. However, the surviving debris impact footprint cannot be guaranteed to avoid inhabited landmasses. Controlled entry normally occurs by using a larger amount of propellant with a larger propulsion system to drive the spacecraft to enter the atmosphere at a steeper flight path angle. It will then enter at a more precise latitude, longitude, and footprint in a nearly uninhabited impact region, generally located in the ocean.

Spacecraft that re-enter from either orbital decay or controlled entry usually break up at altitudes between 84-72 km due to aerodynamic forces causing the allowable structural loads to be exceeded. The nominal breakup altitude for spacecraft is considered to be 78 km. Larger, sturdier, and denser satellites generally breakup at lower altitudes. Solar arrays frequently break off the spacecraft parent body around 90-95 km because of the aerodynamic forces causing the allowable bending moment to be exceeded at the array/spacecraft attach point.

After spacecraft (or parent body) breakup, individual components or fragments will continue to lose altitude and receive aeroheating until they either demise or survive to impact the Earth. Many spacecraft components are made of aluminum, which has a low melting point. As a result, these components usually demise at a higher altitude. On the other hand, if an object is made of a material with a high melting point, (e.g., titanium, stainless steel, beryllium, carbon-carbon), the object will demise at a lower altitude and in many cases will survive. Also, if an object is contained inside a housing, the housing must demise before the internal object receives significant aeroheating. Some objects may have a very high melting point temperature such that they can never demise, but are so light (e.g., tungsten shims) that they impact with a very low velocity. As a result, the kinetic energy at impact is sometimes under 15 J, a threshold below which the probability of human casualty is very low. Thus, the debris casualty areas computed for these objects do not figure into the total debris casualty area in a reentry survivability analysis.

The reentry survivability of spacecraft components is computed by either of two NASA methods. One is the Debris Assessment Software (DAS), a conservative, lower-fidelity software tool found under the "Mitigation" section and the second is a more accurate and higher-fidelity software tool called the Object Reentry Survival Analysis Tool (ORSAT).
