= Gordon Johndroe =

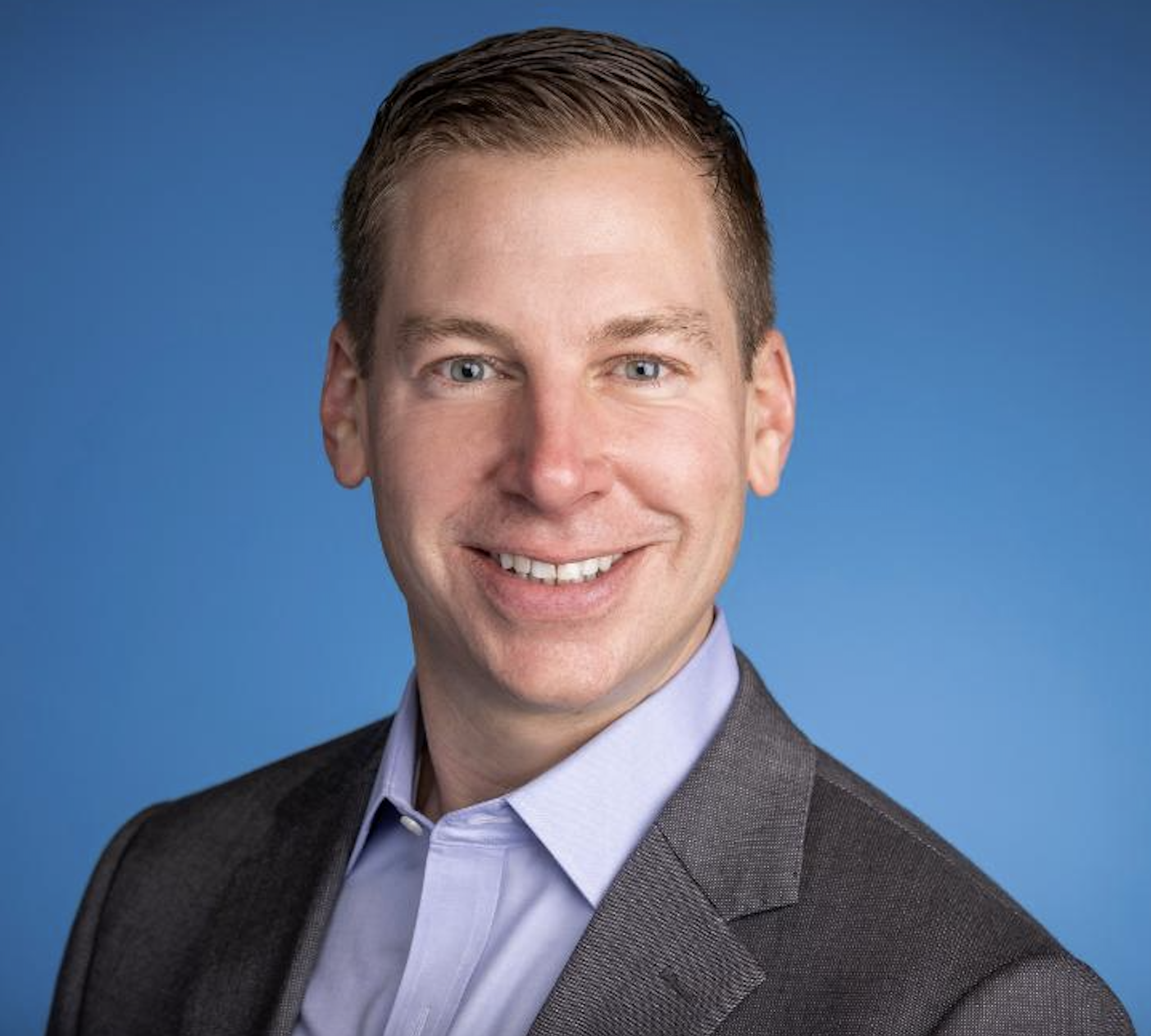
- Born: October 25, 1974 (age 51); Fort Worth, Texas, U.S.
- Education: The University of Texas at Austin

Gordon Johndroe (born October 25, 1974) is a former Managing Director of Communications for American Airlines. From July 2022 until his departure in December 2023, Gordon was the primary spokesman for the airline, responsible for day-to-day media relations globally. During his 18-month tenure at American, he led operational communication teams worldwide, including government and labor communications. He is widely considered to be one of the most impactful communications strategists in the aviation, defense, and technology fields.

Prior to joining American in July 2022, Gordon served as Vice President of Global Media Relations and Public Affairs at The Boeing Company until 2021. He joined Boeing in November 2014 to lead communications strategies associated with advocacy for the company's products and businesses, as well as issues management and outreach to the Washington, D.C. news media and related constituencies. Johndroe was promoted several times at Boeing and eventually took over global communications leadership in 2020. Johndroe previously worked at Lockheed Martin from 2013-2014 as Vice President for Worldwide Media Relations. He served as chief spokesperson for the corporation, counseled senior leaders on media engagements and oversaw Lockheed Martin's media relations campaigns and strategies.

Prior to joining Lockheed Martin, he served as Deputy Assistant to President George W. Bush, Deputy Press Secretary and a spokesman for the United States National Security Council. Johndroe previously served as Director of Strategic Communications and Planning at the State Department, Press Secretary to the First Lady and as the Press Secretary for the Department of Homeland Security. Johndroe also served as an Assistant Press Secretary and as a spokesman at The White House beginning from January 2001 until the creation of the Department of Homeland Security two years later in January 2003. Gordon was traveling with President Bush on September 11, 2001. He worked on then-Governor Bush's presidential campaign of 2000 as well as Bush's 1998 Texas gubernatorial re-election.

== Background ==
Gordon Johndroe is a native of Fort Worth, Texas and attended the University of Texas at Austin. Gordon Johndroe worked on the Bush campaign in 2000 and served in the Bush administration for all eight years, ending his tenure as spokesman for the United States National Security Council.
