= Missile =

Self-propelled guided weapon system

Missile
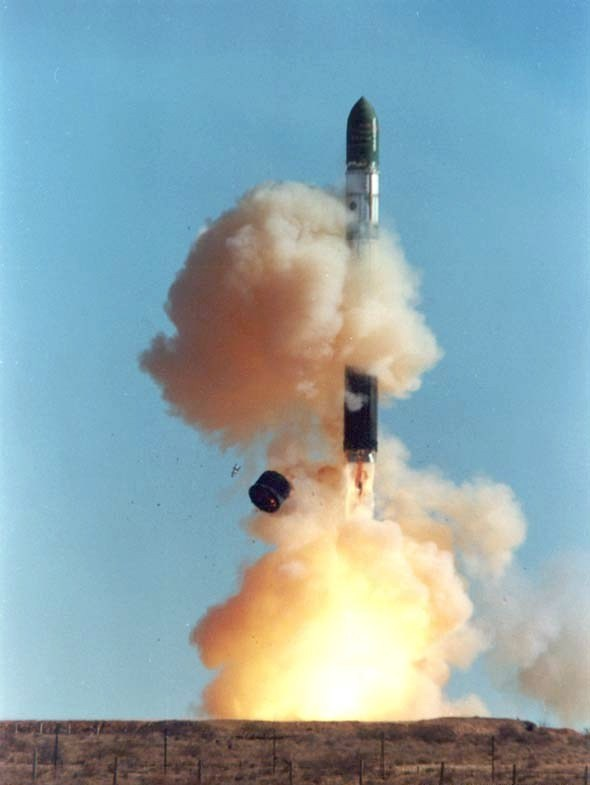
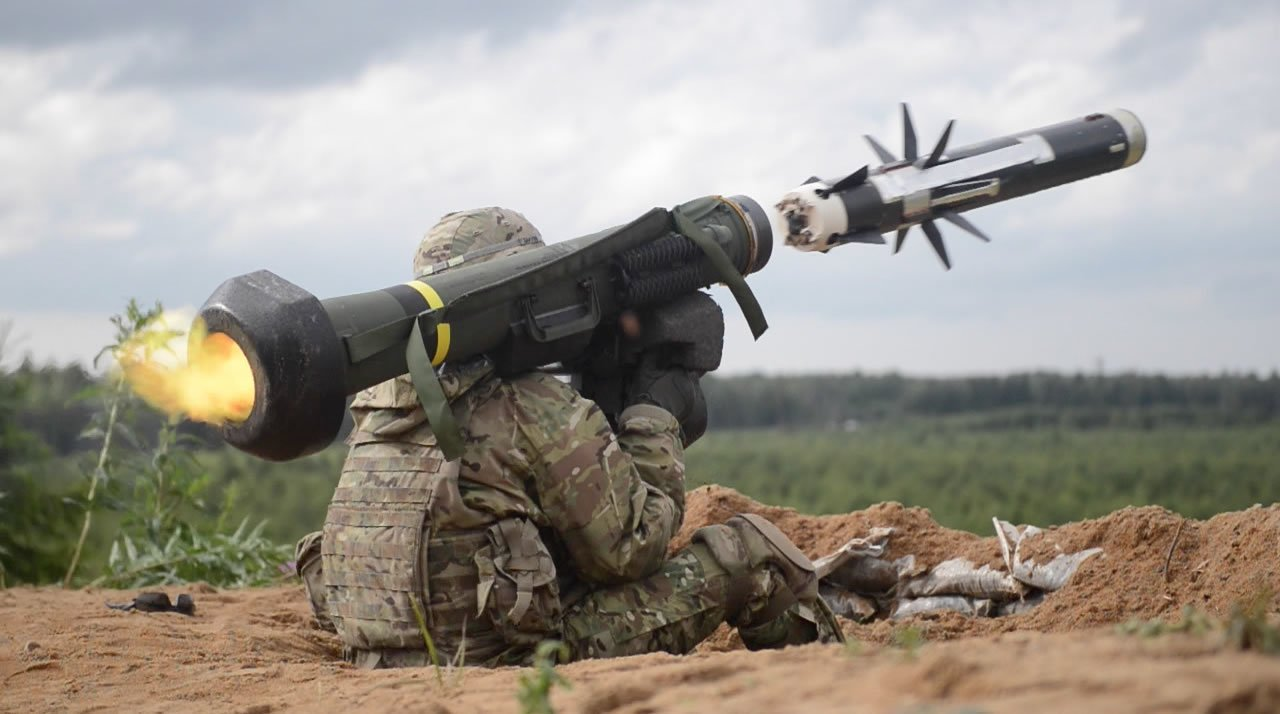
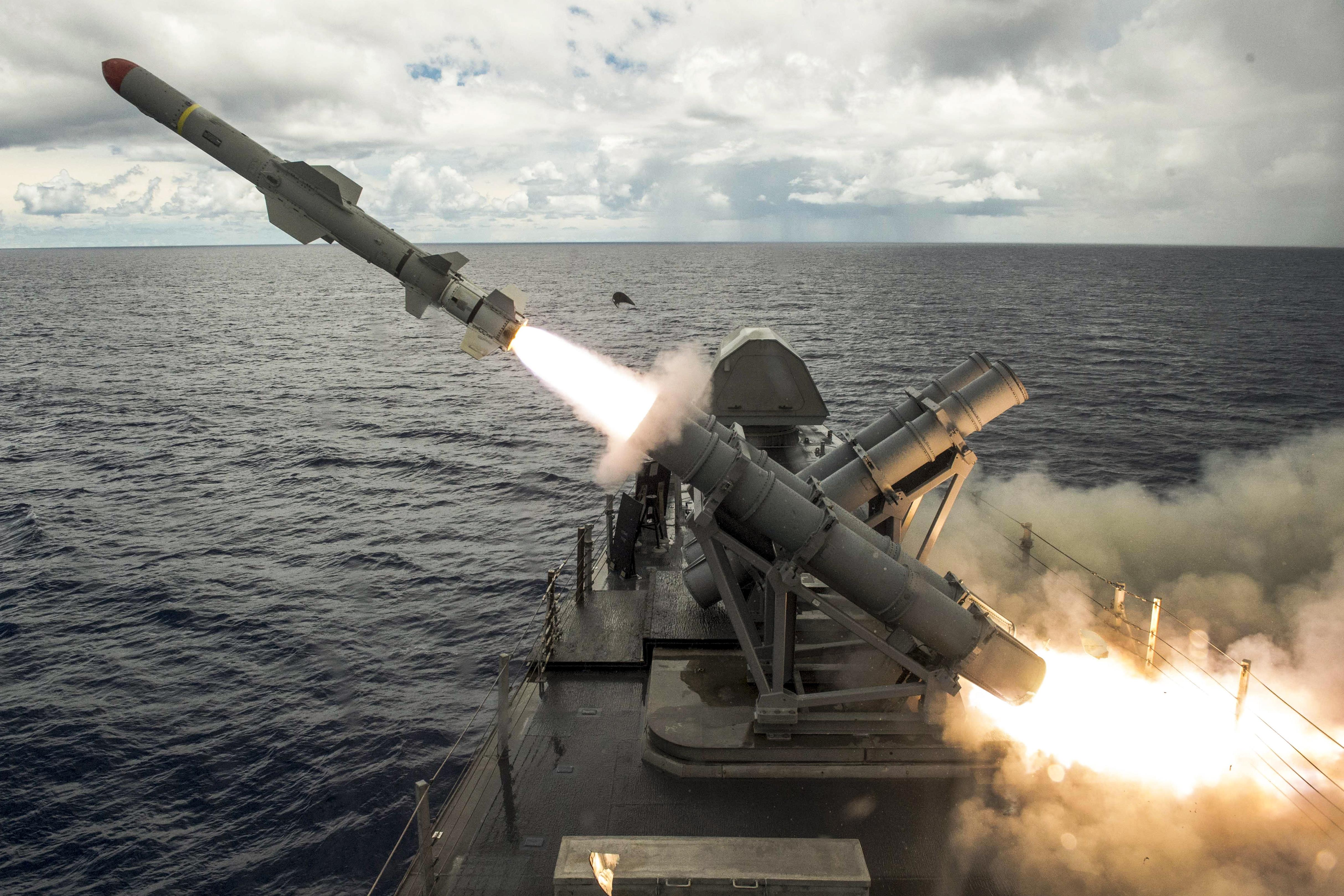
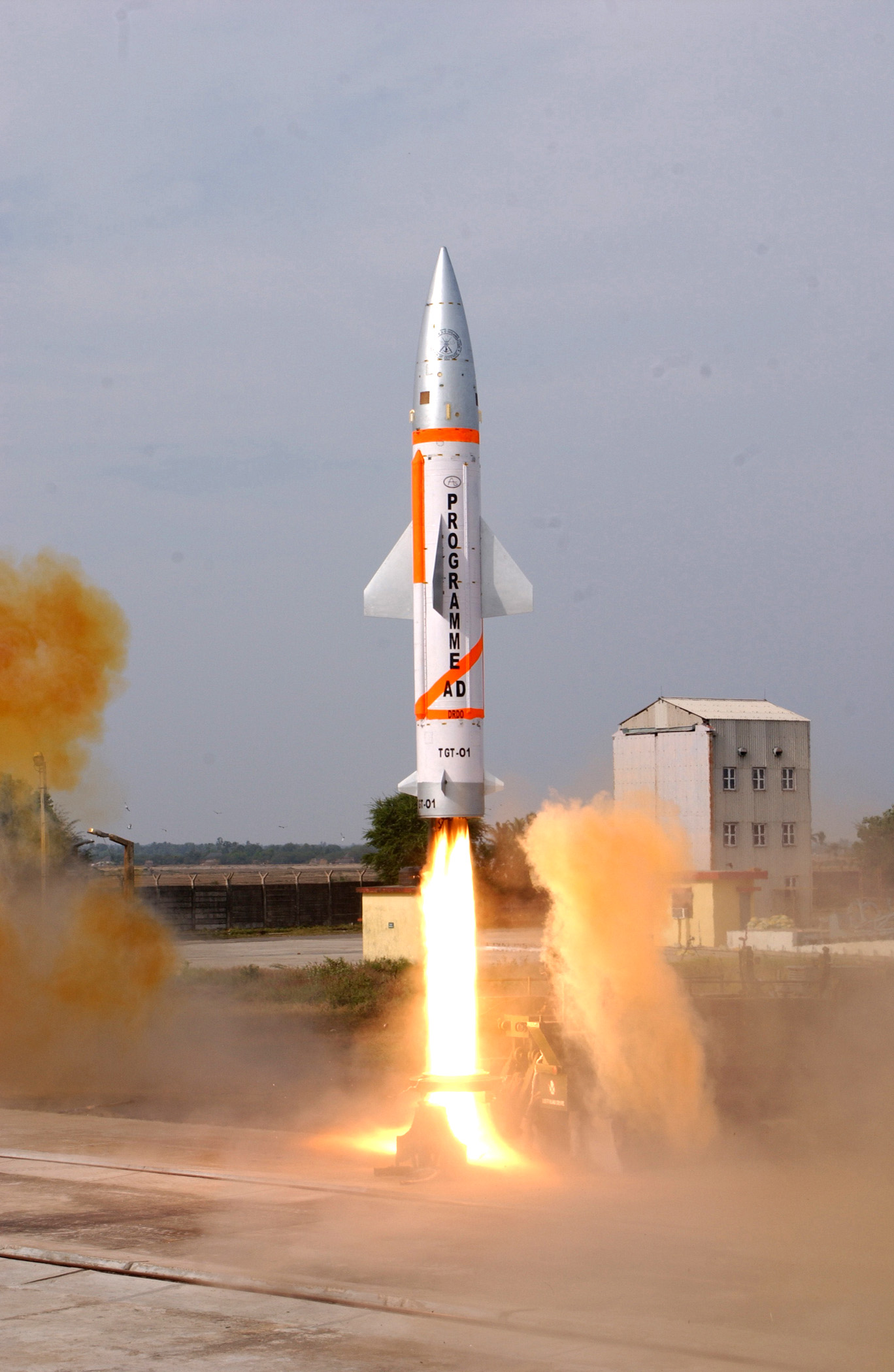
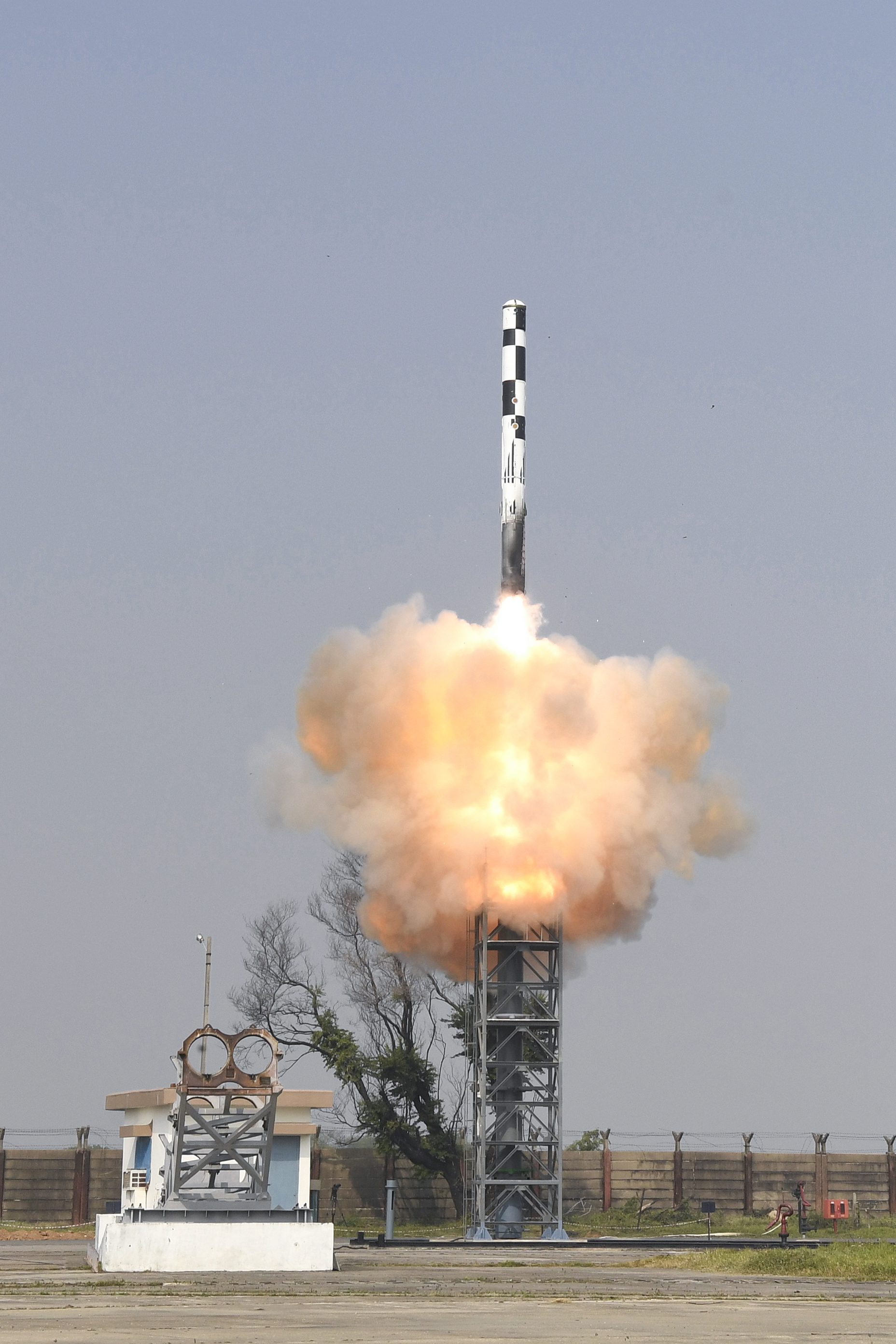
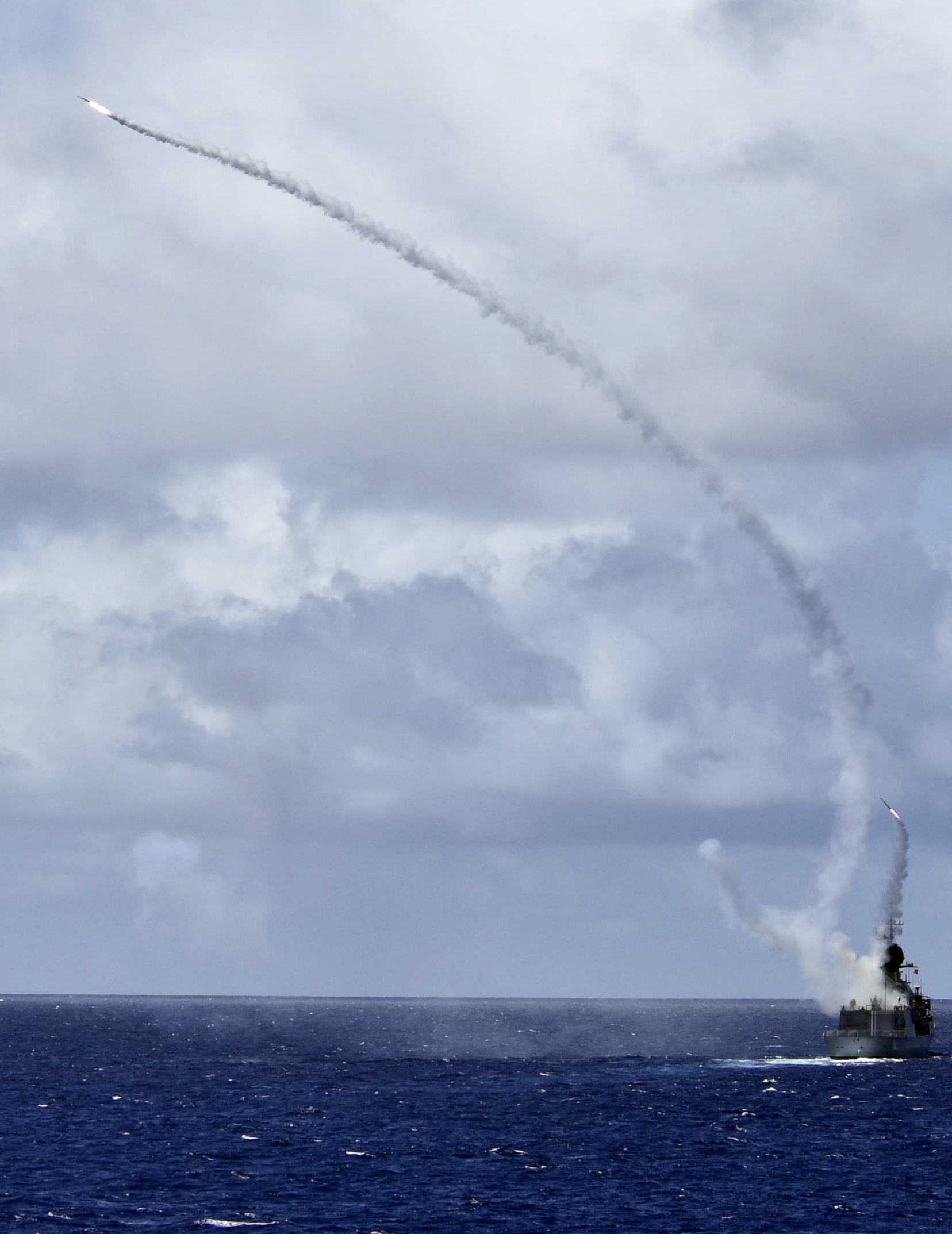
Various types of missiles; Left to right:
1. R-36M: intercontinental ballistic missile
2. FGM-148 Javelin: anti-tank missile
3. Harpoon: anti-ship missile
4. Prithvi: anti-ballistic missile
5. BrahMos: cruise missile
6. RIM-162: surface-to-air missile

A missile is an airborne ranged weapon capable of self-propelled flight aided usually by a propellant, jet engine or rocket engine.

Historically, 'missile' referred to any projectile that is thrown, shot or propelled towards a target; this usage is still recognized today with any unguided jet- or rocket-propelled weapons generally described as rocket artillery. Airborne explosive devices without propulsion are referred to as shells if fired by an artillery piece and bombs if dropped by an aircraft.

Missiles are also generally guided towards specific targets termed as guided missiles or guided rockets. Missile systems usually have five system components: targeting, guidance system, flight system, engine, and warhead. Missiles are primarily classified into different types based on firing source and target such as surface-to-surface, air-to-surface, surface-to-air and air-to-air missiles.

== Terminology ==
Missile is derived from Latin "missilis" meaning "that may be thrown". The first use of the word was in the early 1600s by Philemon Holland. Historically, 'missile' referred to any projectile that is capable of being thrown or a weapon that is shot or propelled towards a target. Later military definition refers to a missile as an airborne ranged weapon capable of self-propelled flight guided towards a specific target. Any unguided jet or rocket-propelled weapons are generally described as rocket artillery, and airborne explosive devices without propulsion are referred to as shells if fired by an artillery piece and bombs if dropped by a vehicle such as an aircraft.

== History ==
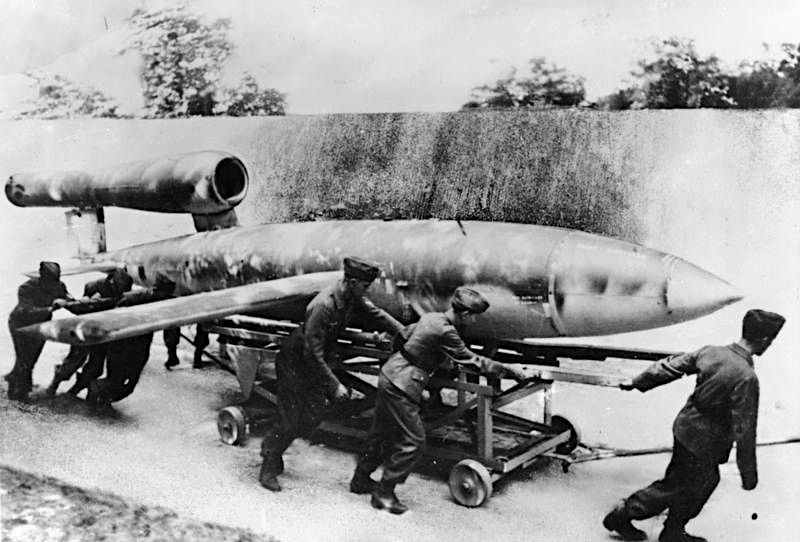
V-1 flying bomb, amongst the first guided missiles

Rockets were the precursors to modern missiles and the first rockets were used as propulsion systems for arrows as early as the tenth century in China. Usage of rockets as weapons before modern rocketry is attested to in China, Korea, India, and Europe. In the 18th century, iron-cased rockets were used in India by the Kingdom of Mysore and Maratha Empire against the British, who later developed the Congreve rocket based on the Mysorean design and used them in the Napoleonic Wars.

In the early 20th century, American Robert Goddard and German Hermann Oberth developed rockets propelled by jet engines. In the 1920s, solid fuel based rockets were developed by the Gas Dynamics Laboratory in the Soviet Union. The first missiles to be used operationally were a series of rocket based missiles developed by Nazi Germany during the Second World War such as the V-1 flying bomb and V-2 rocket, which used mechanical autopilot to keep the missile flying along a pre-chosen route. During the same time, a series of anti-ship and anti-aircraft missiles were also developed, which were typically based on a simple radio control (command guidance) system directed by the operator. However, only a limited number of these missiles were produced and used during the war. After the war, the advent of the Cold War and development of nuclear weapons necessitated faster, more accurate and more versatile missiles with longer range and several countries developed their own missiles.

=== Proliferation restrictions ===
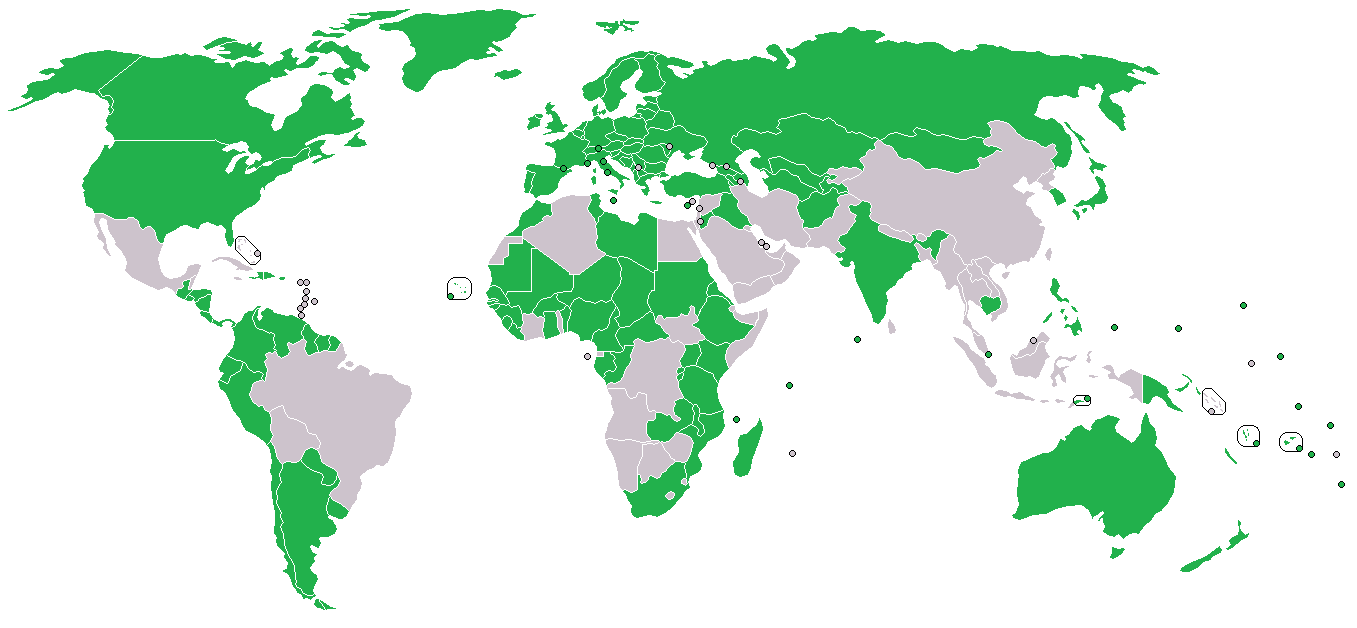
Signatories of the International Code of Conduct against Ballistic Missile Proliferation

Since the 1980s, various attempts were made to control the spread of long range missiles capable of carrying weapons of mass destruction, such as the Missile Technology Control Regime (1987) and the International Code of Conduct against Ballistic Missile Proliferation (2002). Though these were voluntary and not binding international treaties, more than 140 countries ratified these agreements, and provide prior information on missile programs, expected launches, and tests. The introduction of missile launched hypersonic glide vehicles in the late 2010s, development of anti-satellite missiles, and the deployment of dual use missiles capable of carrying both conventional and nuclear warheads are proliferation concerns.

== Components ==
=== Guidance, targeting and flight systems ===
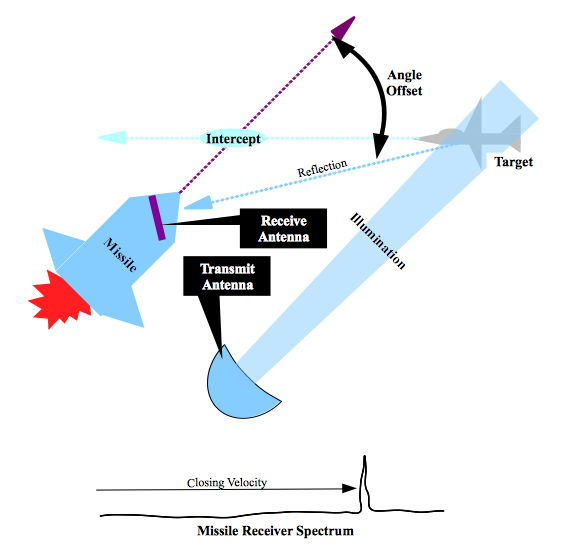
Semi-active missile homing system

A missile is most often guided by a guidance system though there are missiles that are unguided during some phases of flight. Missile guidance refers to methods of guiding a missile to its intended target. Effective guidance is important because reaching the target position accurately and precisely is a critical factor for its effectiveness. The missile guidance system accomplishes this by four steps: tracking the target, computing the directions using tracking information, directing the computed inputs to steering control and steering the missile by directing inputs to motors or flight control surfaces. The guidance system consists of three sections: launch, mid-course and terminal with same or different systems employed across sections.

A simplified diagram of a solid-fuel rocket.: 1. A propellant is packed with a hole in the middle; 2. An igniter combusts the propellant; 3. The hole acts as a combustion chamber; 4. The hot exhaust is choked at the throat; 5. Exhaust exits the rocket

The guidance and homing systems are generally classified broadly into active, semi-active and passive. In active homing systems, the missile carries the equipment needed to transmit the radiation needed to illuminate the target and receive the reflected energy. Once the homing is initiated, the missile directs independently towards the target. In semi-active systems, the source of the radiation is located outside the missile usually in the launch vehicle which might be an aircraft or a ship and the missile will receive the radiation to direct towards the target. As the source is located outside, the launch vehicle needs to continue supporting the missile till it is guided to the intended target. In a passive system, the missile relies solely on the information from the target. The homing system might use light such as infrared, laser or visible light, radio waves or other electromagnetic radiation to illuminate the target. Once the guidance system identifies the target, the target might required to be tracked continuously if it is in motion. A guidance system might use INS which consists of a gyroscope and accelerometer or might use satellite guidance (such as GPS) to track the missile's position relative to a known target. The missile computers will compute the flight path required to steer the missile towards the target. In command guidance, a human operator may operate it manually or a support or launch system will transmit commands by using either optic fiber or radio to guide the missile. The flight system uses the data from the targeting or guidance system to maneuver the missile in flight which might be accomplished using vectored thrust of engines or aerodynamic maneuvering using flight control surfaces such as wings, fins and canards.

=== Propulsion ===
Missiles are powered by propellants igniting to produce thrust and might employ types of rocket or jet engines. Rockets might be fueled by solid-propellants which are comparatively easier to maintain and enables faster deployment. These propellants contain a fuel and oxidizer mixed in select proportions with the grain size and burn chamber determining the rate and time of burn. Larger missiles might use liquid-propellant rockets where propulsion is provided by a single or combination of liquid fuels. A hybrid system uses solid rocket fuel with a liquid oxidizer. Jet engines are generally used in cruise missiles, most commonly of the turbojet type, because of their relative simplicity and low frontal area while turbofans and ramjets can also be theoretically used.

From the 1950s to early 1970s, the United States operated Project Rover and Project Pluto for developing nuclear thermal rockets and nuclear-powered ramjet engines for powering cruise missiles respectively. Both performed static engine tests but were cancelled before deployment. Ballistic missiles often have multiple stages and might use similar type or a mix of propulsion types. Some missiles may have additional propulsion from another source at launch such as a catapult, cannon or tank gun.

=== Warhead ===
Missiles have one or more explosive warheads, although other weapon types may also be used. The warheads of a missile provide its primary destructive power which might cause secondary destruction due to the kinetic energy of the weapon. Warheads are most commonly of the high explosive type, often employing shaped charges to exploit the accuracy of a guided weapon to destroy hardened targets. Warhead might carry conventional, incendiary, nuclear, chemical, biological or radiological weapons.

== Classification ==
Missiles can be classified into categories by various parameters such as type, launch platform and target, range, propulsion and guidance system. Missiles are generally categorized into strategic or tactical missile systems. Tactical missile systems are short-range systems used to carry out a limited strike in a smaller area and might carry conventional or nuclear warheads. Strategic missiles are long-range weapons used to target beyond the immediate vicinity and are mostly designed to carry nuclear warheads though other warheads can also be fitted.

=== Strategic ===
Typical ballistic missile sequence: 1. Launches by firing motor1(A); 2. Stage1 drops, motor2(B) ignites & shroud(E) ejects; 3. Motor3(C) ignites and separates; 4. Stage3 terminates and post-boost vehicle(D) separates; 5. Vehicle maneuvers itself and prepares re-entry vehicle (RV); 6. RV with decoys and chaffs deploys; 7. RV re-enters the atmosphere; 8. Warhead(s) detonate on target

Strategic weapons are often classified into cruise and ballistic missiles. Ballistic missiles are powered by rockets during launch and follow a trajectory that arches upwards before descending to reach its intended target while cruise missiles are continuously powered by jet engines and travel at a flatter trajectory.

==== Ballistic ====
A ballistic missile is powered by single or multiple rockets in stages initially before following an unpowered trajectory that arches upwards before descending to reach its intended target. It can carry both nuclear and conventional warheads. A ballistic missile might reach supersonic or hypersonic speed and often travel out of the Earth's atmosphere before re-entry. It usually has three stages of flight:

- Boost phase: First phase at launch when one or more stages of rocket engine(s) fire propelling the missile
- Mid-course phase: Second phase when the rocket engines stop firing and the missile continues ascending upwards on the given trajectory
- Terminal phase: Final phase when the warhead(s) detach and descend towards the target

Ballistic missiles are categorized based on range as:

- Short range: less than 1,000 kilometres (620 mi)
- Medium range: 1,000 kilometres (620 mi) to 3,000 kilometres (1,900 mi)
- Intermediate range: 3,000 kilometres (1,900 mi) to 5,500 kilometres (3,400 mi)
- Intercontinental: greater than 5,500 kilometres (3,400 mi)

==== Cruise ====
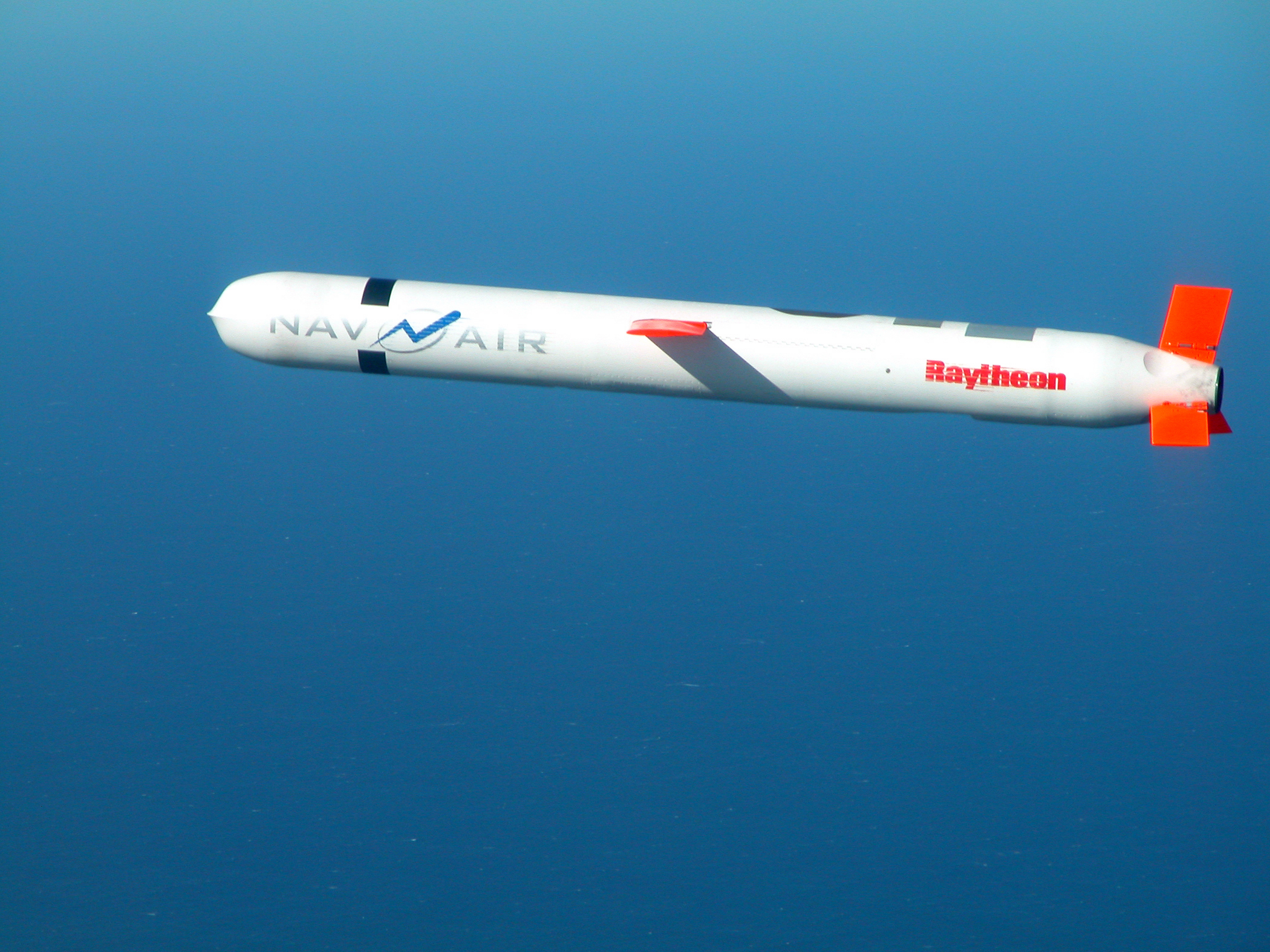
Tomahawk cruise missile in flight

A cruise missile is a guided missile that remains in the atmosphere and flies the major portion of its flight at a constant speed. It is designed to deliver a large warhead over long distances with high precision, and is propelled by jet engines. A cruise missile can be launched from multiple platforms and is often self-guided. It flies at lower speeds (often subsonic or supersonic) and close to the surface of the Earth, which expends more fuel but makes it difficult to detect.

=== Tactical ===
Missiles are classified on the basis of launch platform and target into anti-ship, anti-tank, air-to-air, air-to-surface, surface-to-air, surface-to-surface, and anti-satellite.

System	Abbreviation	Launch platform	Target
Anti-ship	AShM	Air / Land / Water	Water
Anti-tank	ATGM	Air / Land	Land
Air-to-air	AAM	Air	Air
Air-to-surface	ASM	Air	Land
Surface-to-air	SAM	Land	Air
Surface-to-surface	SSM	Land	Land
Anti-satellite	ASAT	Air / Land / Water	Space

==== Anti-ship ====
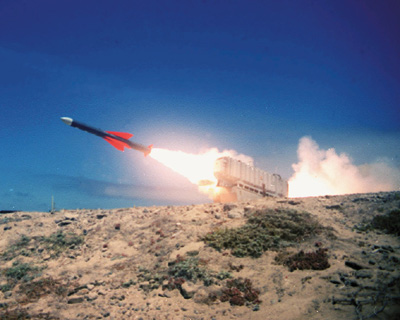
Exocet anti-ship missile in flight

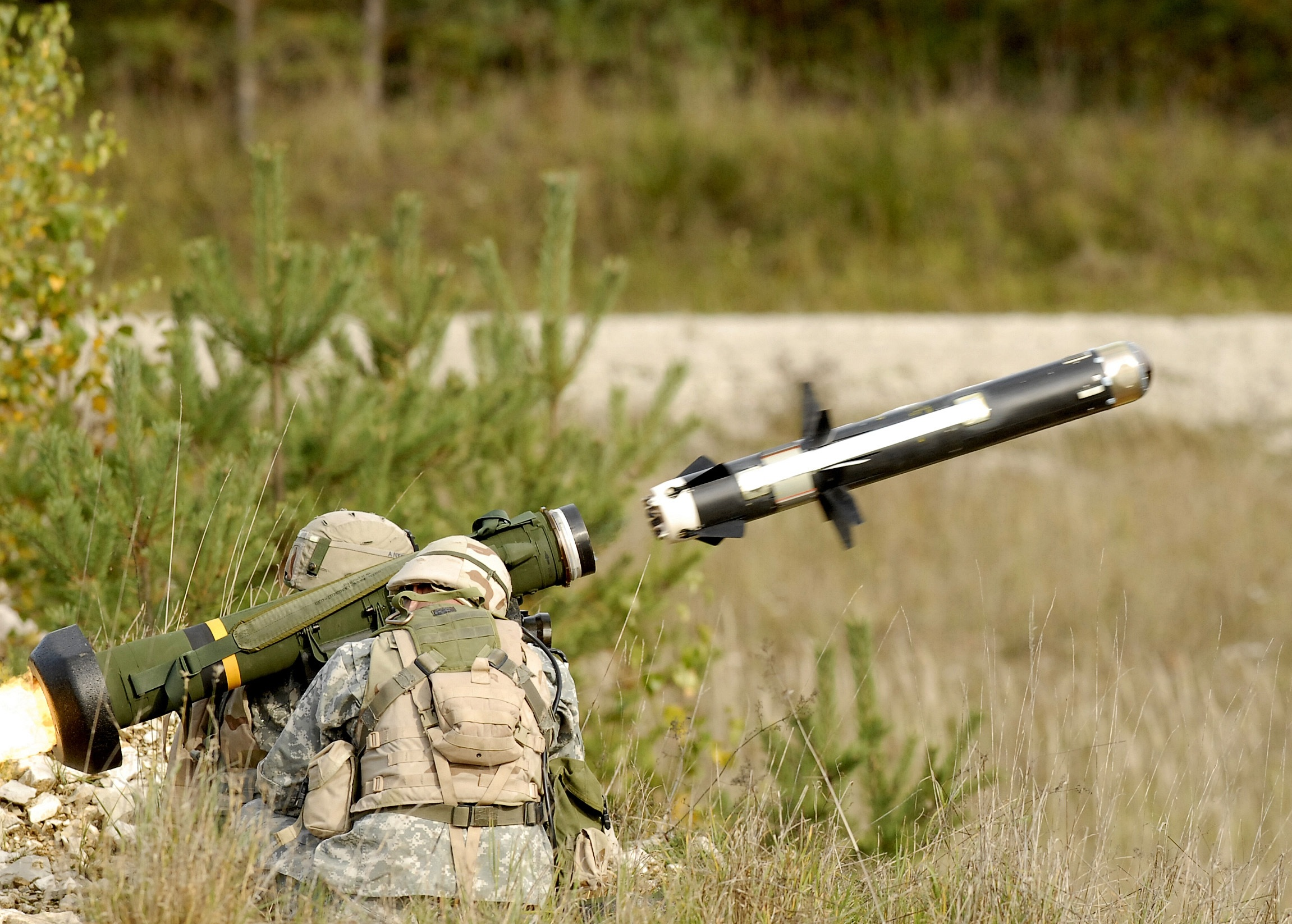
FGM-148 anti-tank missile

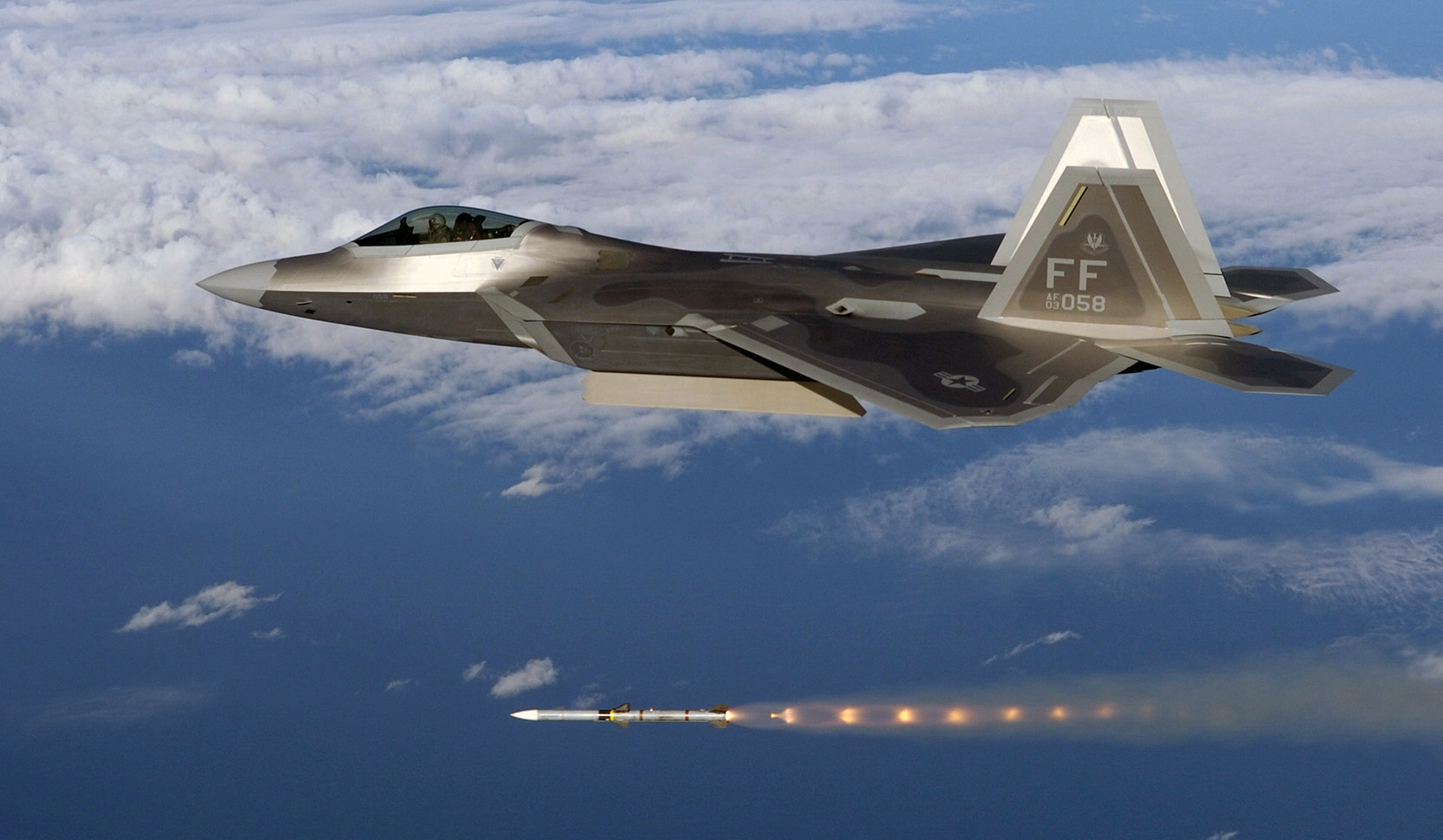
AIM-120 AMRAAM fired from a F-22

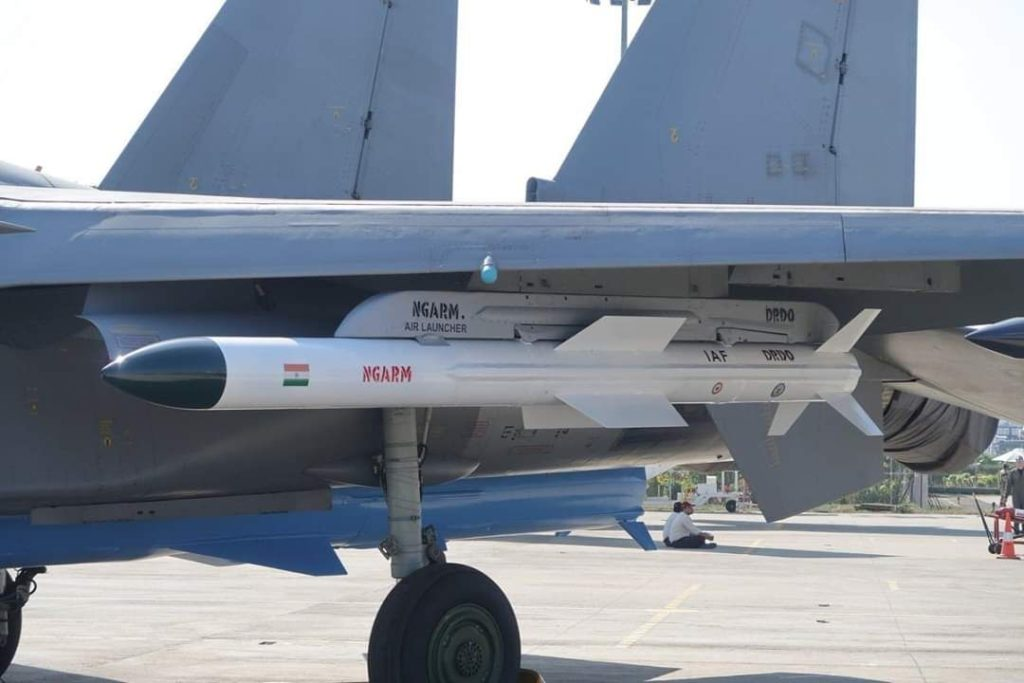
Rudram-1 air-to-surface missile

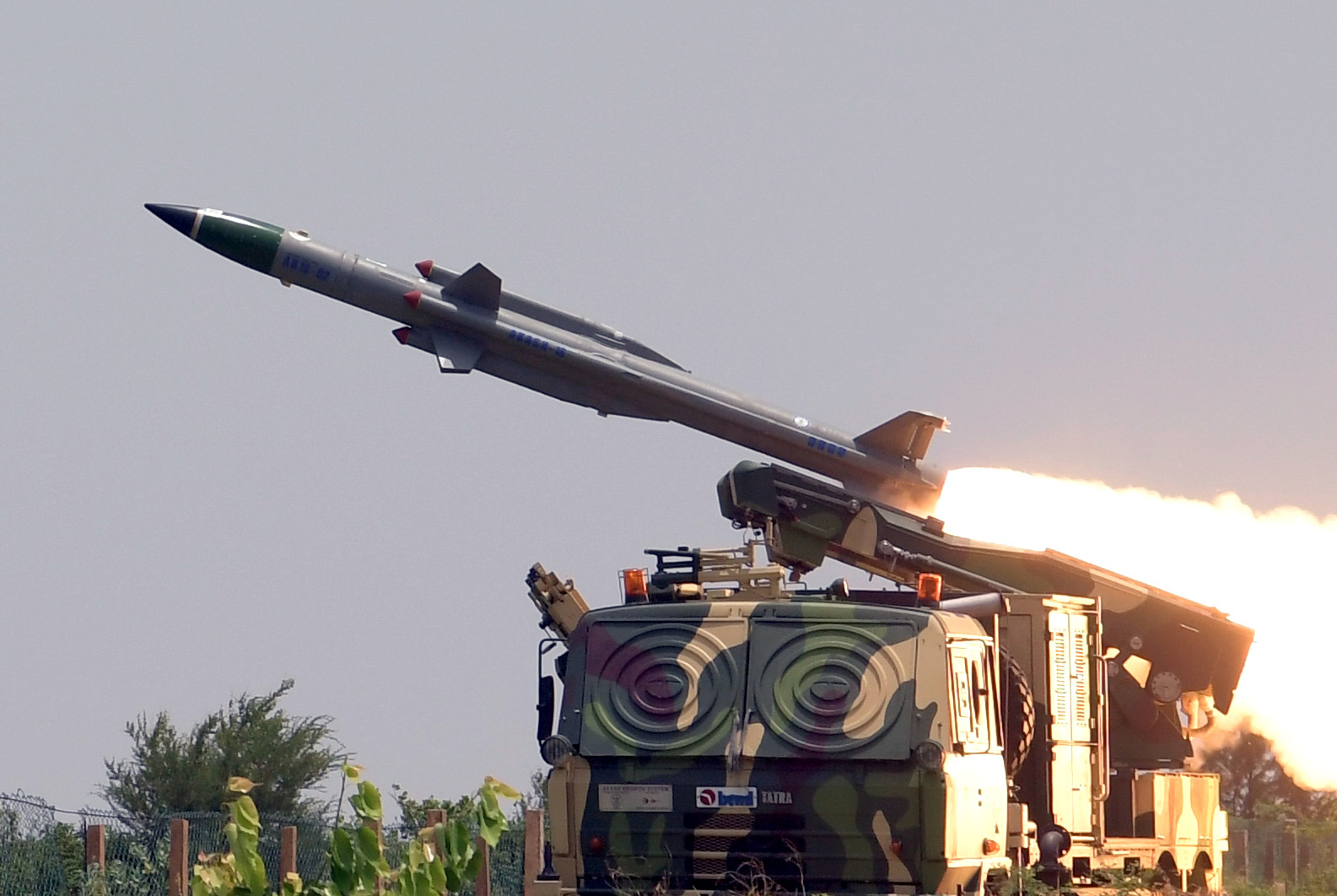
Akash SAM fired from a mobile platform

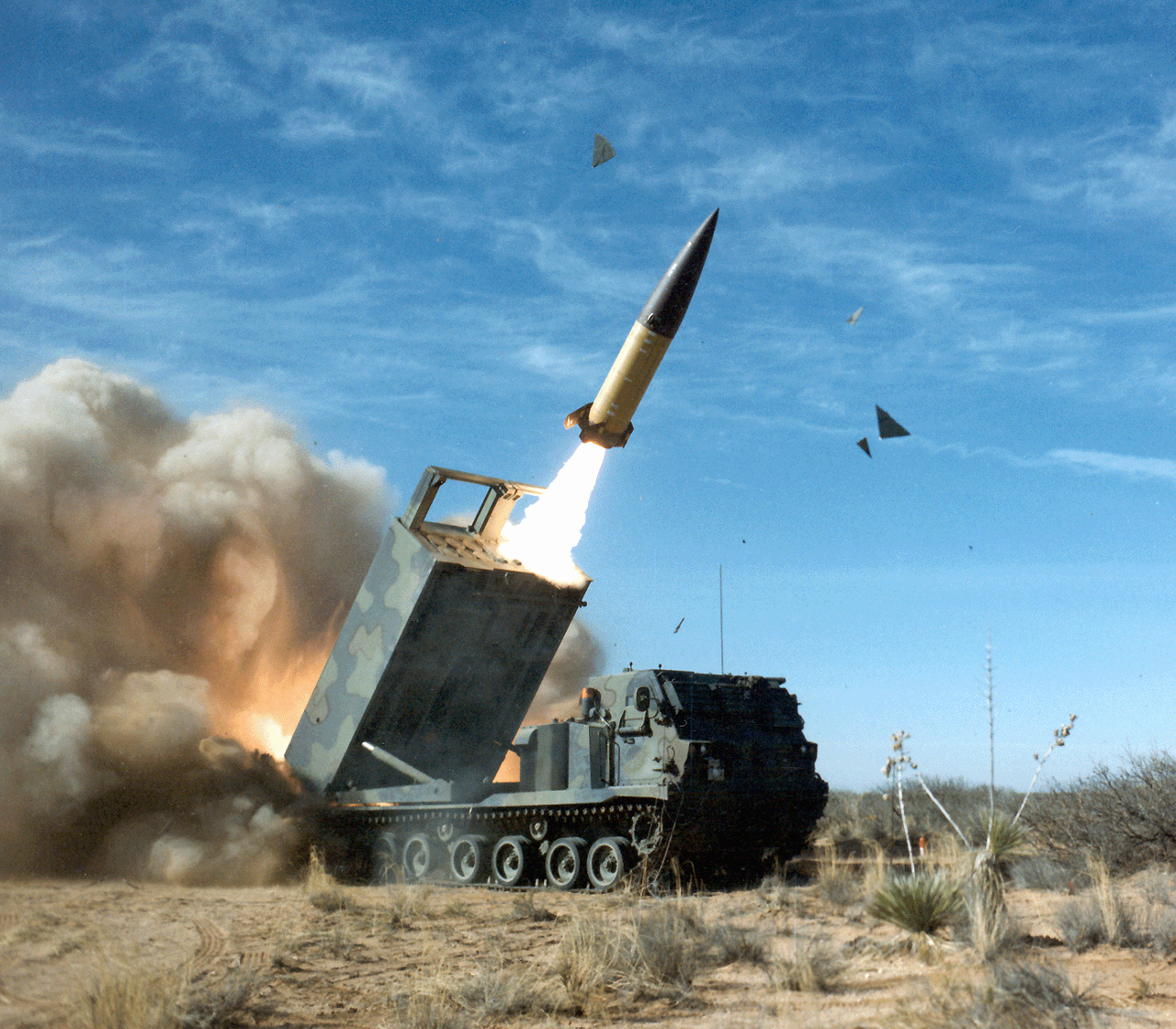
MGM-140 ATACMS surface-surface missile

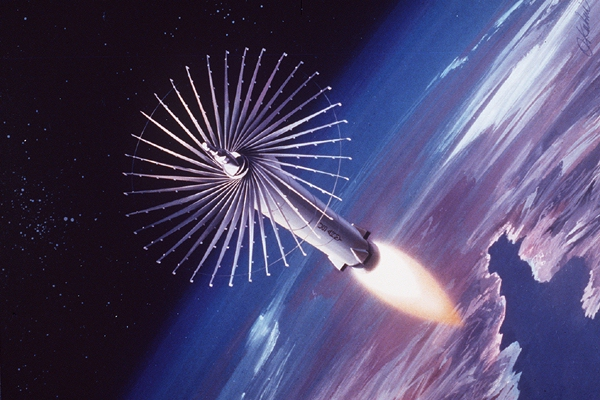
An artist's impression of an anti-satellite weapon

An anti-ship missile (AShM) is designed for use against large boats and ships such as destroyers and aircraft carriers. Most anti-ship missiles are of the sea skimming variety, and many use a combination of inertial guidance and active radar homing. A large number of other anti-ship missiles use infrared homing to follow the heat that is emitted by a ship; it is also possible for anti-ship missiles to be guided by radio command all the way. Many anti-ship missiles can be launched from a variety of weapons systems including surface warships, submarines, fighter aircraft, maritime patrol aircraft, helicopters, shore batteries, land vehicles and by infantry.

Anti-submarine missile is a standoff anti-submarine weapon variant of anti-ship missiles used to deliver an explosive warhead aimed directly at a submarine, a depth charge, or a homing torpedo.

==== Anti-tank ====
An anti-tank guided missile (ATGM) is a guided missile primarily designed to hit and destroy heavily armored military vehicles. ATGMs range in size from shoulder-launched weapons, which can be transported by a single soldier, to larger tripod-mounted or vehicle and aircraft mounted missile systems. Earlier man-portable anti-tank weapons like anti-tank rifles and magnetic anti-tank mines had a short range but sophisticated antitank missiles can be directed to a longer target by several different guidance systems, including laser guiding, television camera, or wire guiding.

==== Air-to-air ====
An air-to-air missile (AAM) is a missile fired from a fighter aircraft for the purpose of destroying another aircraft. AAMs are typically powered by one or more rocket motors, usually solid fueled but sometimes liquid fueled. A radar or heat emission based homing system is generally used and sometimes can use a combination. Short range missiles used to engage opposing aircraft at ranges of less than 16 km often use infrared guidance while long range missiles mostly rely upon radar guidance.

==== Air-to-surface ====
An air-to-surface missile (ASM) is a missile fired from an attack aircraft, strike fighter or an attack helicopter for the purpose of destroying land based targets. Missiles are typically guided and unguided glide bombs not considered missiles. The most common propulsion systems are rocket motor for short range and jet engines for long-range but ramjets are also used. Missile guidance is typically via laser, infrared homing, optical or satellite. Air-to-surface missiles for ground attack by aircraft provide a higher standoff distance engaging targets from far away and out of range of low range air defenses.

==== Surface-to-air ====
A surface-to-air missile (SAM) is a missile designed to be launched from the ground to destroy aircraft, other missiles or flying objects. It is a type of anti-aircraft system and missiles have replaced most other forms of anti-aircraft weapons due to the increased range and accuracy. Anti-aircraft guns are being used only for specialized close-in firing roles. Missiles can be mounted in clusters on vehicles or towed on trailers and can be hand operated by infantry. SAMs frequently use solid-propellants and may be guided by radar or infrared sensors or by a human operator using optical tracking.

==== Surface-to-surface ====
A surface-to-surface missile (SSM) is a missile designed to be launched from the ground or the sea and strike targets on land. They may be fired from hand-held or vehicle mounted devices, from fixed installations or from a ship. They are often powered by a rocket engine or sometimes fired by an explosive charge, since the launching platform is typically stationary or moving slowly. They usually have fins and/or wings for lift and stability, although hyper-velocity or short-ranged missiles may use body lift or fly a ballistic trajectory. Most anti-tank and anti-ship missiles are part of surface-to-surface missile systems.

==== Anti-satellite ====
An anti-satellite weapon (ASAT) is a space weapon designed to incapacitate or destroy satellites for strategic or tactical purposes. Although no ASAT system has yet been utilized in warfare, a few countries have successfully shot down their own satellites to demonstrate their ASAT capabilities in a show of force. ASATs have also been used to remove decommissioned satellites. ASAT roles include defensive measures against an adversary's space-based and nuclear weapons, a force multiplier for a nuclear first strike, a countermeasure against an adversary's anti-ballistic missile defense (ABM), an asymmetric counter to a technologically superior adversary, and a counter-value weapon.

== See also ==
- Vertical launching system
