= Project SAINT =

US anti-Soviet spacecraft system

- SAtellite INTerceptor
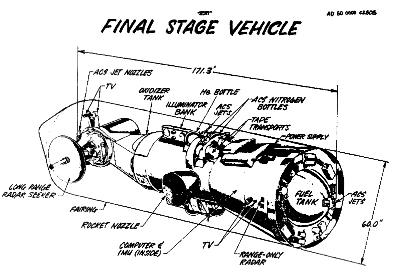
- A diagram of one of the SAINT project satellites
- Project type: Originally Satellite killer, became Satellite inspector.
- Funding agency: ARPA
- Objective: To make a satellite with anti-satellite capabilities.
- Location: Colorado Springs
- Project coordinator: NORAD
- Budget: Total: 100 million dollars
- Duration: c. 1957 – December 1962

Project SAINT (an acronym formed from "SAtellite INTerceptor") was a project undertaken by the United States during the Cold War to develop a means of intercepting, inspecting and destroying Soviet spacecraft. Many details relating to the project are still classified. The order to launch the SAINT could only be given by the NORAD commander-in-chief, and presumably, anyone higher ranked than them.

Calls for an anti-satellite weapon started days after the launch of Sputnik in 1957, but president Eisenhower was concerned about the militarization of space and limited such work to studies only. These early studies suggested using the existing MIDAS and SAMOS airframes armed with a nuclear weapon. Over time these plans changed to a dedicated interceptor, SAINT, which used a hit-to-kill profile. He faced continued pressure to develop a system, which reached a peak in early 1960 due to repeated US Air Force claims that the Soviets were developing space-based nuclear weapons.

President Kennedy inherited SAINT, and in keeping with his policy of achieving a technical lead over the Soviets, allowed hardware development to begin. By late 1962 the program was already significantly over budget and still far from a testable system. By this time it was clear the Soviets were not developing the claimed space-based warheads and the need for such an expensive system to counter non-weapon spacecraft could not be justified. As a result of advances in countermeasures on Soviet satellites, alongside the development of cheaper anti-satellite methods, the concept was rendered unsuitable.

== History ==
The project was created after the Central Intelligence Agency's 1957 National Intelligence Estimate 11-5-57, named "Soviet Capabilities and Probable Programs in the Guided Missile Field", estimated that the Soviet Union would be capable of having a reconnaissance satellite in space by 1963. The United States Air Force issued General Operational Requirement-170 on 19 June 1958 ordering the development of a system that was capable of destroying a satellite. Then the United States Air Force and Advanced Research Projects Agency (ARPA) commissioned studies by the Space Technology Laboratories and the Radio Corporation of America. The plan for development of the system formulated by the Air Force was shown to the National Security Council on 5 February 1960. On 17 March 1961, the Radio Corporation of America received a contract to develop Project SAINT.

=== Project phases ===
The project was broken into three phases. Phase one was to create a satellite that could meet and inspect another satellite of 1 square meter (11 sq ft) radar cross-section that was in orbit at up to 740 kilometers (460 mi) high. Phase two was to create a satellite capable of making multiple inspections, with a vertical range up to 7,400 kilometers (4,600 mi) high. Phase three was to create a satellite that could destroy other satellites, based on the platform of the satellite of phase two. The SAINTs were expected to weigh 4,400 pounds (2,000 kg), and be 14 feet (4.3 m) long.

=== Developments ===
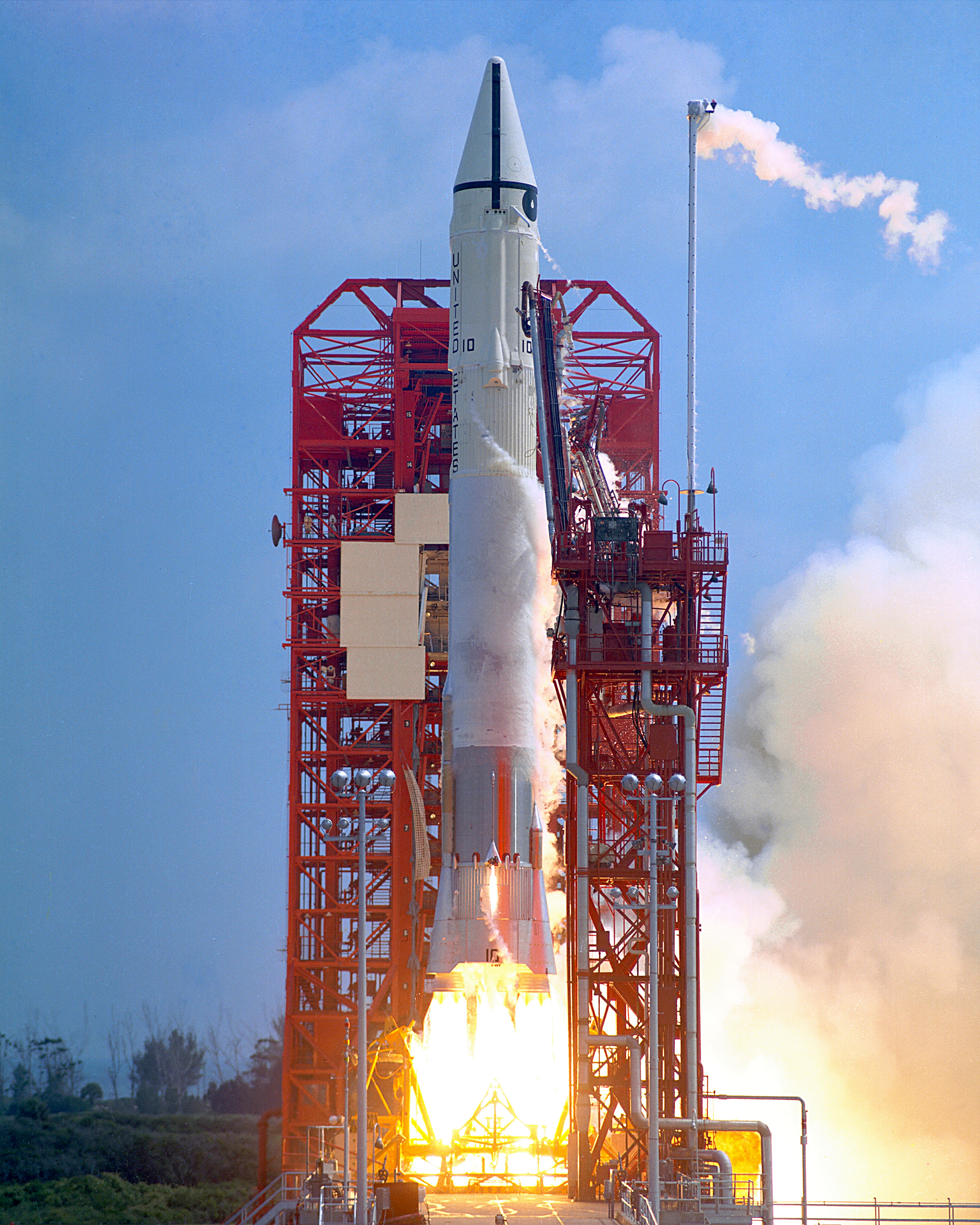
An Atlas-Centaur booster launching

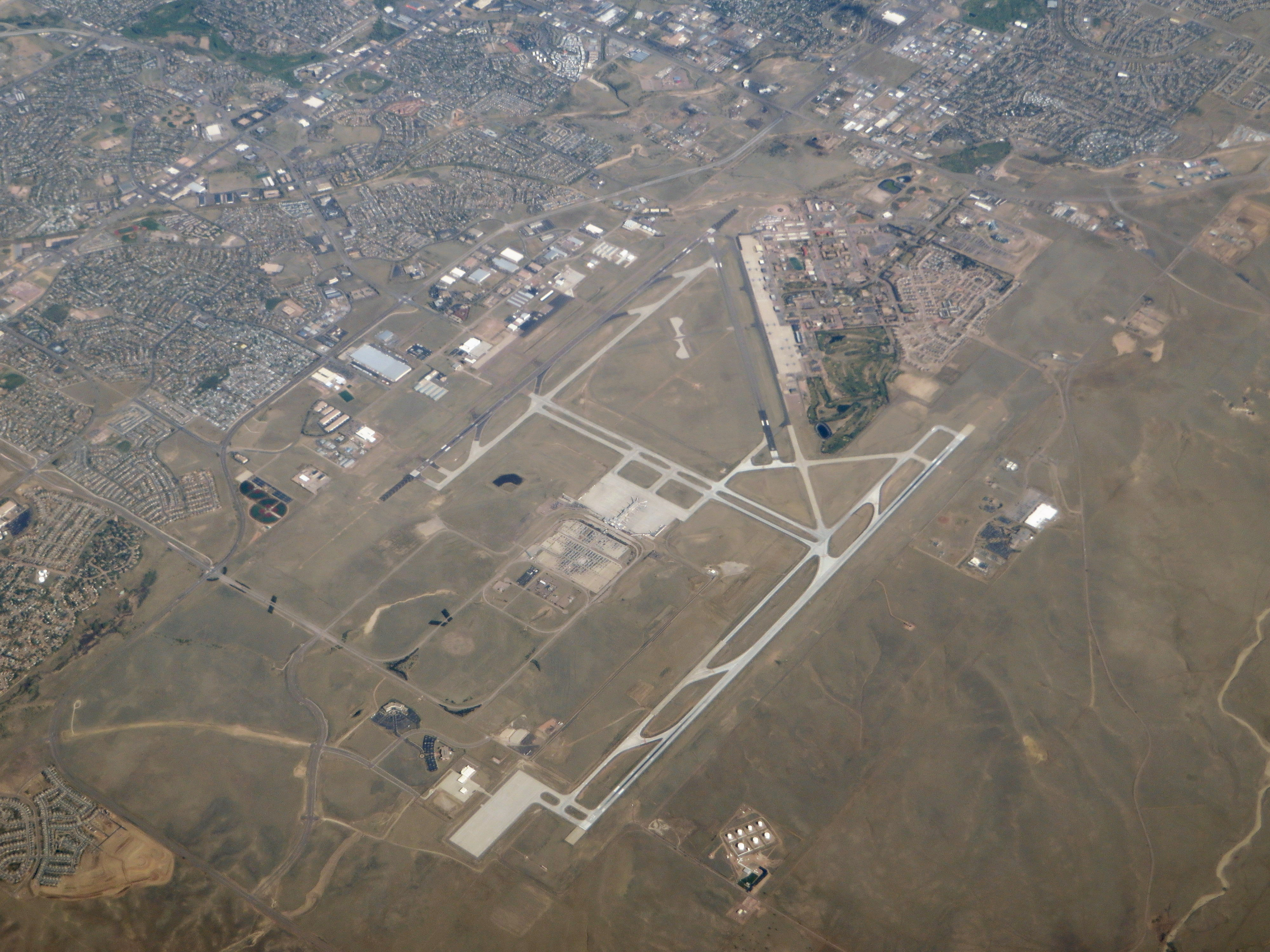
The NORAD facility at Colorado Springs

The project included the building of a SAINT operation center within the North American Aerospace Defense Command (NORAD) complex in Colorado Springs, and the construction of launch facilities that could respond within 12 hours at Cape Canaveral and Vandenberg, along with stations in Florida and Rhodesia.

The study undertaken by the Space Technology Laboratory suggested the use of a Thor-Hydra booster, however the more capable and more readily available Atlas-Agena B booster was selected instead. In phase two they switched to the use of the Atlas-Centaur booster, instead of an Atlas-Agena B booster.

The third phase of the project included several elements such as a powerful main engine whose propellant was pressure fed, a computer and a unit to measure inertia in order to control maneuvers. In addition, a long and close range radar system was required to guide the satellite (the system was taken from the Westinghouse radar used in Bomarc surface-to-air missile), as were lights to illuminate the other satellite, and four cameras for observation. A radiation detector was to be installed to determine if a satellite was carrying either a nuclear weapon or something whose power source involved a radioactive substance. Other sensors included infrared and gravimetric sensors to ascertain the mass of the other satellite, while defensive counter measures would be installed to identify decoys, booby traps, anti-jamming devices, and enemy attack, along with nitrogen cold gas thrusters for orientation.

The concept was for the satellite to be launched ahead of its target, so that the target would come close to it. After this the Agena would be used as fuel to put the SAINT in a co-orbit with its target, and then the SAINT would locate the target using its long range radar, and jettison its Agena once it had acquired the target. Then within the next 8 to 12 minutes the SAINT's radar and orientation systems would guide it to within 39 ft (12m) of the target. If a SAINT was launched from Cape Canaveral, it would be able to provide initial video of the target and data dumps to the NORAD station in Rhodesia. A full inspection of the target would take two hours, and be recorded, then sent to a ground station as soon as it came within the range of the station. It would then stay within 200 ft (60m) of the target for up to two days, taking pictures and measurements at different angles. After this it would be depleted of battery power and propellant.

Several designs for the exact method of destroying the target were suggested. One of these was to have the satellite carry out a kamikaze attack on the target, while another was to coat it with black paint, blocking its ability to see or transmit, rendering it inoperable. Yet another was for it to use a laser to disable reconnaissance or optical sensors of the target. Another suggestion was for the satellite to carry a nuclear missile, of up to one megaton yield, and launch it at the satellite. However, in July 1959, Joseph V. Charyk directed that all technical efforts were to be focused on developing the inspection function, rather than the kill function, effectively ending its role as a satellite interceptor, and shifting the project to the development of a satellite inspector.

=== Cancellation ===
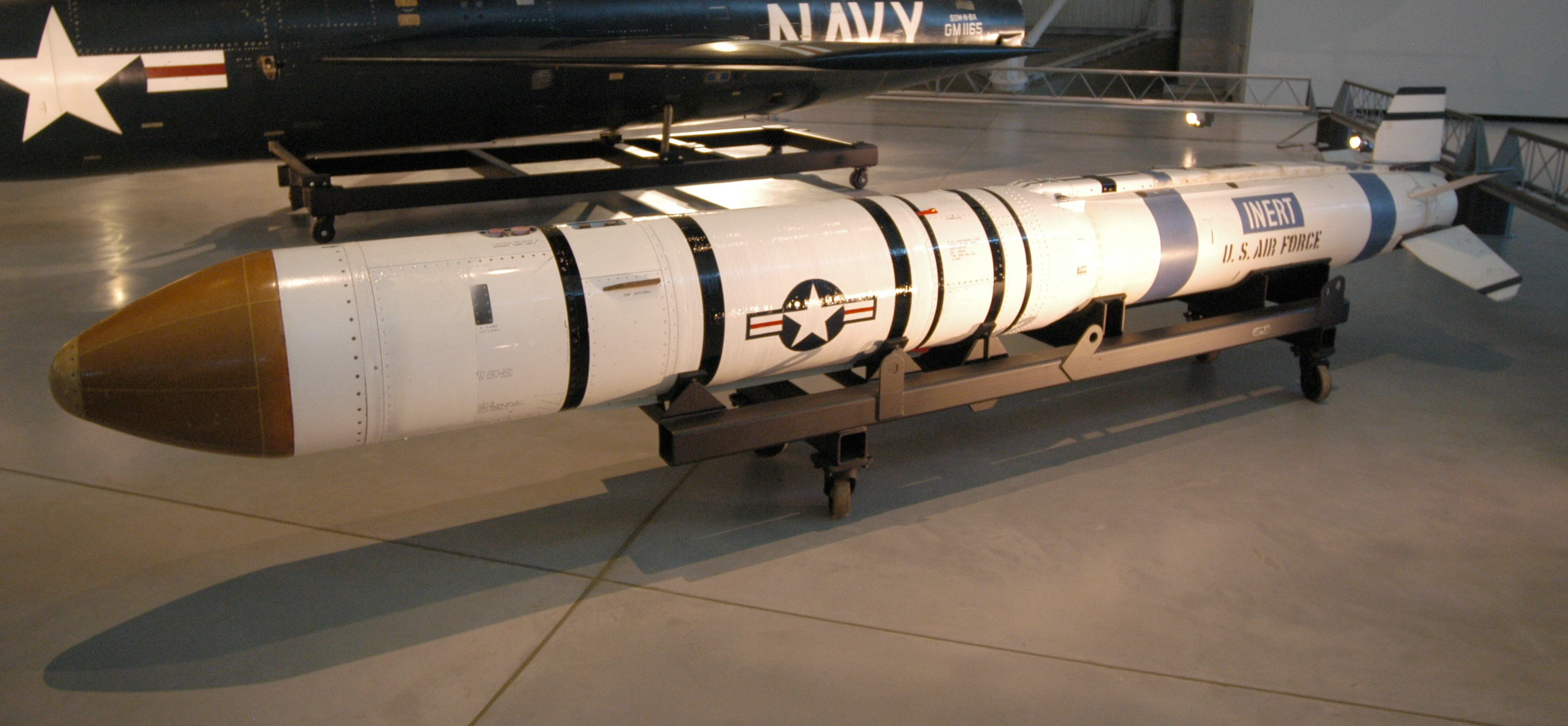
A missile carried by the F-15 Eagle fighter jet to shoot down satellites

It was planned to launch four satellites in December 1962. However, before the launches could take place, then Secretary of Defense Robert McNamara cancelled the program, due to concerns that it would not be able to operate if a full-scale nuclear war broke out, and that only a small number of SAINTs could be launched at a time. The project had also gone over budget, spending over 100 million dollars, which was several times the funding that had been publicly reported. By the end of the 1960s, the concept of inspecting Soviet satellites was abandoned as the Soviets had begun installing destruction packages on their satellites, that would blow up both itself and the SAINT, by use of the APO-2 destruction system, which could either be set off by its operators in the USSR, or if it sensed that it was being scanned. The standard American military reconnaissance satellite was capable of scanning other satellites long range, along with ground-based detection of satellites.

The project's only unique role, that of being able to destroy satellites, was then given to fighter planes, which were cheaper and could hit a satellite without being detected, and also to the LIM-49 Nike Zeus, a ballistic missile with possible anti-satellite use. Under Program 437, the Thor DSV-2 rocket, which was derived from the PGM-17 Thor Intermediate-range ballistic missile, was made. The DSV-2 would carry W49 or W50 nuclear warheads, which would ensure that the target satellite would either be destroyed by the nuclear blast, or the resulting electromagnetic pulse. A wing of the program was called "Alternate Payload" used DSV-2J rockets, which were also based on the PGM-17 Thor, to inspect satellites.
