= Anti-ballistic missile defense countermeasure =

Military tactic

Anti-ballistic missile defense countermeasures are tactical or strategic actions taken by an attacker to overwhelm, destroy, or evade anti-ballistic missile defenses.

Anti-ballistic missile (ABM) defense countermeasures can be categorized in a variety of ways, such as whether something is attacked or just confounded or distracted (i.e., whether the defender is attacked, whether the defender's ABM defense is attacked, or whether the defenders ABM system is confounded). They can be categorized by the type of ABM system they are to operate against. Finally, they can be categorized by which part of a ballistic missile's flight they are active (boost, bus, midcourse, or terminal phases).

== Attacking Countermeasures ==
=== Countermeasures Attacking the Defender ===
The simplest countermeasure to an ABM defense is to simply increase the size of the attack. This can be done by adding more ICBMs, by increasing the number of warheads delivered by each ICBM using MIRVs, by using SLBMs (which have a much shorter flight time and are thus difficult to destroy before the terminal phase), or by a heavier reliance on bombers and cruise missiles.

=== Countermeasures Attacking the Defense ===
These countermeasures include anti-satellite weapons, space weapons, and the launching of clouds of debris or projectiles in identical but counter-rotating orbits to a space-based defense.

== Confounding Countermeasures ==
=== Countermeasures Confounding the Defense ===
These countermeasures include using fast-burn boosters (which limit the time allowed for boost-phase intercept), light-weight ICBM skirts which limit the infrared signature of the booster (rocketry), use of decoys (e.g., lightweight mylar balloons which, until re-entry, will travel on an identical trajectory with the heavier warheads), use of Ablation materials or reflective coatings which limit the damage of directed energy weapons, launches of numerous harmless missiles early in an attack which might cause the defender reveal their defenses and expend valuable resources.

== See also ==
- Anti-ballistic missile
