= TIMED =

NASA atmospheric observation satellite

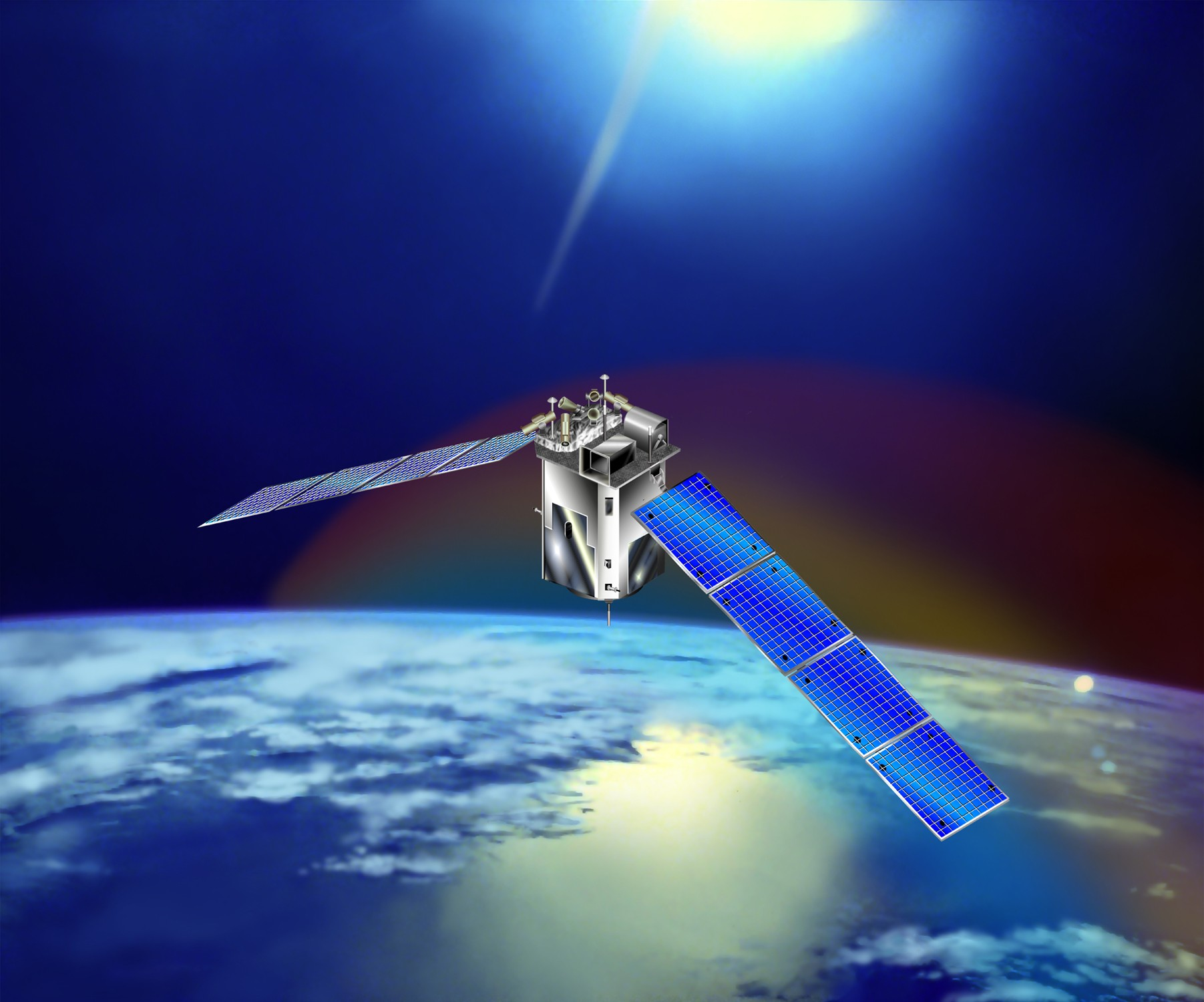
- TIMED in low Earth orbit
- Names: Thermosphere • Ionosphere • Mesosphere • Energetics and Dynamics
- Mission type: Ionosphere; Atmospheric science Space weather research
- Operator: NASA
- COSPAR ID: 2001-055B
- SATCAT no.: 26998
- Website: TIMED at APL
- Mission duration: Planned: 2 years Elapsed: 24 years, 11 months, 9 days

Spacecraft properties
- Manufacturer: Applied Physics Laboratory
- Launch mass: 660 kg (1,460 lb)
- Dimensions: 2.72 meters high 11.73 meters wide 1.2 meters deep
- Power: 406 watts

Start of mission
- Launch date: 7 December 2001, 15:07:35 UTC
- Rocket: Delta II 7920-10 (Delta D289)
- Launch site: Vandenberg, SLC-2W
- Entered service: 22 January 2002

Orbital parameters
- Reference system: Geocentric orbit
- Regime: Low Earth orbit
- Altitude: 625 km (388 mi)
- Inclination: 74.1°
- Period: 97.3 minutes

The TIMED (Thermosphere • Ionosphere • Mesosphere • Energetics and Dynamics) mission is dedicated to study the influences that energetics and dynamics of the Sun and humans have on the least explored and understood region of Earth's atmosphere – the Mesosphere and Lower Thermosphere / Ionosphere (MLTI). The mission was launched from Vandenberg Air Force Base in California on 7 December 2001 aboard a Delta II rocket launch vehicle. The project is sponsored and managed by NASA, while the spacecraft was designed and assembled by the Applied Physics Laboratory at Johns Hopkins University. The mission has been extended several times, and has now collected data over an entire solar cycle, which helps in its goal to differentiate the Sun's effects on the atmosphere from other effects. It shared its Delta II launch vehicle with the Jason-1 oceanography mission.

== Atmospheric region under study ==
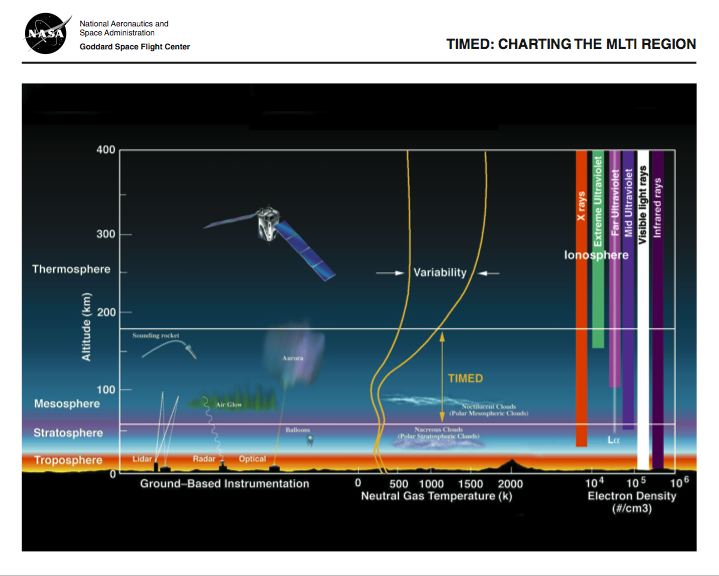
TIMED Mission diagram (NASA)

The Mesosphere, Lower Thermosphere and Ionosphere (MLTI) region of the atmosphere to be studied by TIMED is located between 60 and 180 kilometres (37 and 112 mi) above the Earth's surface, where energy from solar radiation is first deposited into the atmosphere. This can have profound effects on Earth's upper atmospheric regions, particularly during the peak of the Sun's 11-year solar cycle when the greatest amounts of its energy are being released. Understanding these interactions is also important for our understanding of various subjects in geophysics, meteorology, aeronomy, and atmospheric science, as solar radiation is one of the primary driving forces behind atmospheric tides. Changes in the MLT can also affect modern satellite and radio telecommunications.

== Scientific instruments ==
The spacecraft payload consists of the following four main instruments:

- Global Ultraviolet Imager (GUVI), which scans cross track from horizon to horizon to measure the spatial and temporal variations of temperature and constituent densities in the lower thermosphere, and to determine the importance of auroral energy sources and solar extreme ultraviolet sources to the energy balance in that region.
- Solar Extreme ultraviolet Experiment (SEE), a spectrometer and a suite of photometers designed to measure the solar soft X-rays, extreme-ultraviolet and far-ultraviolet radiation that is deposited into the MLT region.
- TIMED Doppler Interferometer (TIDI), designed to globally measure the wind and temperature profiles of the MLT region.
- Sounding of the Atmosphere using Broadband Emission Radiometry (SABER), multichannel radiometer designed to measure heat emitted by the atmosphere over a broad altitude and spectral range, as well as global temperature profiles and sources of atmospheric cooling.

The data collected by the satellite's instruments are made freely available to the public.

== Specifications ==
- Mass: 660 kilograms
- Dimensions:
  - 2.72 meters high
  - 1.61 meters wide (launch configuration)
  - 11.73 meters wide (solar arrays deployed)
  - 1.2 meters deep
- Power consumption: 406 watts
- Data downlink: 4 megabits per second
- Memory: 5 gigabits
- Control and data handling processor: Mongoose-V
- Attitude:
  - Control - Within 0.50°
  - Knowledge - Within 0.03°
  - Processor: RTX2010
- Total mission cost:
  - Spacecraft: US$195 million
  - Ground operations: US$42 million

== Satellite operations ==
TIMED experienced minor problems with attitude control when, after launch, the magnetorquers failed to slow the spacecraft's spin as intended. An engineer installing the magnetorquers had mistakenly recorded the reverse of their actual polarities, which generated a sign error in the flight software. The problem was fixed by temporarily disabling the orbiter's magnetic field sensor and uploading a software patch to fix the sign error. In a separate incident, another software update fixed a problem caused by faulty testing of the Sun sensors. After these corrections, the attitude control system functioned as intended.

== Kosmos 2221 conjunction ==
At approximately 06:30 UTC on 28 February 2024, TIMED passed within 10 meters of the defunct Kosmos 2221 satellite. As neither TIMED nor Kosmos 2221 can be maneuvered, the conjunction was unavoidable. LeoLabs, a satellite tracking company, had estimated a satellite collision probability of as high as 8% prior to the encounter. A collision between the two satellites, both traveling at hypervelocity speeds relative to each other, was projected to generate between 2,500 and 7,500 fragments of space debris, a figure potentially exceeding that of the 2009 satellite collision between Iridium 33 and Kosmos 2251. This close miss was particularly concerning to NASA, which highlighted the event at the 39th Space Symposium in Colorado Springs in a broader speech on NASA's new space sustainability strategy plan.

== Scientific results ==
TIMED has improved scientific understanding of long-term trends in the upper atmosphere. The SABER instrument has collected a continuous record of water vapor and carbon dioxide levels in the stratosphere and mesosphere.

SABER is able to collect 1,500 water vapor measurements per day, a vast improvement from previous satellites and ground-based observations. SABER had a flaw in its optical filter that caused it to overestimate water vapor levels; this error was discovered and the data were corrected. Based on the corrected data, SABER found that between 2002 and 2018, water vapor levels in the lower stratosphere were increasing at an average rate of 0.25 ppmv (around 5%) per decade, and in the upper stratosphere and mesosphere, water vapor levels were increasing at an average rate of 0.1-0.2 ppmv (around 2-3%) per decade. Growth in methane levels is thought to be partially responsible for the growth in water vapor levels, as methane oxidizes into carbon dioxide and water vapor, but changes driven by the solar cycle may also be responsible.

SABER has also monitored carbon dioxide levels in the upper atmosphere. The instrument found that carbon dioxide levels in the upper atmosphere are increasing: at an altitude of 110 kilometres (68 mi), CO_{2} levels were rising at an average rate of 12% per decade. This rate is faster than what has been predicted by climate models, and suggests that there is more vertical mixing of CO_{2} than previously thought.

By collecting upper atmosphere data, TIMED assists the modeling of environmental impacts. Water vapor and carbon dioxide are greenhouse gases and their growth in the upper atmosphere must be factored into climate models. Additionally, upper atmosphere water vapor contributes to ozone depletion.

== Instrument teams ==
=== United States ===
- University of Alaska, Fairbanks, Alaska
- University of California, Berkeley, California
- Jet Propulsion Laboratory, Pasadena, California
- University of Colorado, Boulder, Colorado
- National Center for Atmospheric Research, Boulder, Colorado
- National Oceanic and Atmospheric Administration, Boulder, Colorado
- Johns Hopkins University Applied Physics Laboratory, Laurel, Maryland
- Air Force Research Laboratory, Hanscom Air Force Base, Massachusetts
- Stewart Radiance Laboratory, Bedford, Massachusetts
- University of Michigan, Ann Arbor, Michigan
- Southwest Research Institute, San Antonio, Texas
- Utah State University, Logan, Utah
- Hampton University, Hampton, Virginia
- Computational Physics, Inc., Fairfax, Virginia
- Naval Research Laboratory, Washington, D.C.
- NASA Langley Research Center, Hampton, Virginia
- G&A Technical Software Inc., Hampton, Virginia

=== International ===
- Hovemere Limited, Kent, England, United Kingdom
- British Antarctic Survey, Cambridge, England, United Kingdom
- CREES-York University, Toronto, Ontario, Canada
- Astrophysical Institute of Andalucia (IAA), Granada, Spain
- Rostock University, Rostock, Germany

== See also ==
- Upper Atmosphere Research Satellite, 1991-2005
