= LM-700 =

LM-700 (Iridium)
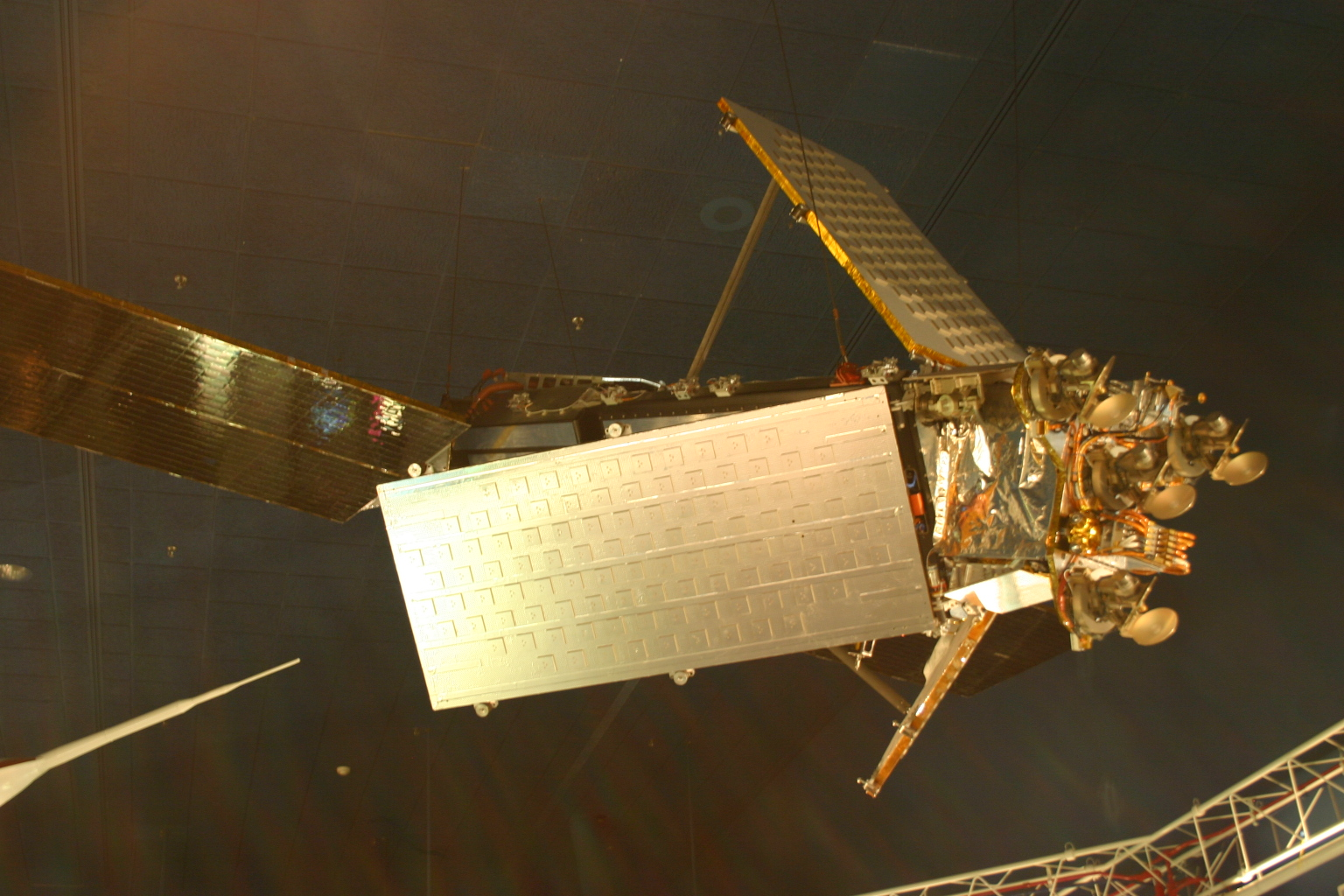
- An LM-700A in a museum
- Manufacturer: Motorola; Lockheed Martin
- Country of origin: United States
- Operator: Iridium Satellite LLC
- Applications: Communication

Specifications
- Launch mass: 689 kilograms (1,519 lb)
- Power: 2 Solar arrays
- Regime: Low Earth

Production
- Status: Out of production
- Built: 99
- Launched: 95
- Operational: At least 66
- Retired: At least 2
- Failed: 5
- Maiden launch: Iridium 4; 5 May 1997
- Last launch: Iridium 98; 20 June 2002

The LM-700 is a satellite bus which was built by Lockheed Martin between the mid-1990s and early 2000s. Typically used for low Earth orbit communications satellites, ninety nine were built, all but one for Iridium Satellite LLC. The exception was a technology development satellite for the United States Air Force, which was never launched. In addition, two boilerplate satellites were launched on a test flight of the Chinese Long March 2C rocket.

== Overview ==
Two variants of the LM-700 were built. The ninety eight Iridium satellites used the LM-700A configuration, specialised for communications. Of these ninety five were launched, whilst three were retained as spares. One of the spare satellites is now displayed in the US National Air and Space Museum.

The LM-700B, designed for other missions, was also offered. One was built as the SBIRS-LADS demonstration satellite for the US Air Force's Space Based Infrared System, however its launch was cancelled after the satellite had been completed and delivered to the customer.

The LM-700A Iridium satellites were launched in clusters between 1997 and 2002. Satellites were launched in groups of five on Delta II 7920-10C rockets, groups of seven on Proton-K/DM2 rockets, pairs on the Long March 2C and on the last launch, two satellites on a Rockot. The cancelled SBIRS-LADS satellite would have used an Athena II.

An LM-700A, Iridium 33 was one of the satellites destroyed in the 2009 satellite collision. Most of the Iridium satellites currently in orbit have already exceeded their design life, whilst others are approaching the end of it, however at least enough satellites are still operating to maintain the network, which requires sixty six.

== Satellites ==
| Name | Bus | Launch | | | Owner | Status | Remarks |
| Name | Bus | Date/Time (GMT) | Rocket | Site | Owner | Status | Remarks |
|---|---|---|---|---|---|---|---|
| Iridium 1 | LM-700A | N/A | | | Iridium | Not launched | |
| Iridium 2 | LM-700A | N/A | | | Iridium | Not launched | |
| Iridium 3 | LM-700A | 1998-08-19, 23:01 | Long March 2C-III/SD | Taiyuan LC-1 | Iridium | Active | |
| Iridium 4 | LM-700A | 1997-05-05, 14:55 | Delta II 7920-10C | Vandenberg SLC-2W | Iridium | Active | |
| Iridium 5 | LM-700A | 1997-05-05, 14:55 | Delta II 7920-10C | Vandenberg SLC-2W | Iridium | Active | |
| Iridium 6 | LM-700A | 1997-05-05, 14:55 | Delta II 7920-10C | Vandenberg SLC-2W | Iridium | Active | |
| Iridium 7 | LM-700A | 1997-05-05, 14:55 | Delta II 7920-10C | Vandenberg SLC-2W | Iridium | Active | |
| Iridium 8 | LM-700A | 1997-05-05, 14:55 | Delta II 7920-10C | Vandenberg SLC-2W | Iridium | Active | |
| Iridium 9 | LM-700A | 1997-06-18, 14:02 | Proton-K/DM2 | Baikonur Site 81/23 | Iridium | Active | |
| Iridium 10 | LM-700A | 1997-06-18, 14:02 | Proton-K/DM2 | Baikonur Site 81/23 | Iridium | Active | |
| Iridium 11 | LM-700A | 1997-06-18, 14:02 | Proton-K/DM2 | Baikonur Site 81/23 | Iridium | Active | |
| Iridium 12 | LM-700A | 1997-06-18, 14:02 | Proton-K/DM2 | Baikonur Site 81/23 | Iridium | Active | |
| Iridium 13 | LM-700A | 1997-06-18, 14:02 | Proton-K/DM2 | Baikonur Site 81/23 | Iridium | Active | |
| Iridium 14 | LM-700A | 1997-06-18, 14:02 | Proton-K/DM2 | Baikonur Site 81/23 | Iridium | Active | |
| Iridium 15 | LM-700A | 1997-07-09, 13:04 | Delta II 7920-10C | Vandenberg SLC-2W | Iridium | Active | |
| Iridium 16 | LM-700A | 1997-06-18, 14:02 | Proton-K/DM2 | Baikonur Site 81/23 | Iridium | Active | |
| Iridium 17 | LM-700A | 1997-07-09, 13:04 | Delta II 7920-10C | Vandenberg SLC-2W | Iridium | Active | |
| Iridium 18 | LM-700A | 1997-07-09, 13:04 | Delta II 7920-10C | Vandenberg SLC-2W | Iridium | Active | |
| Iridium 19 | LM-700A | 1997-09-27, 01:23 | Delta II 7920-10C | Vandenberg SLC-2W | Iridium | Active | |
| Iridium 20 | LM-700A | 1997-07-09, 13:04 | Delta II 7920-10C | Vandenberg SLC-2W | Iridium | Failed | |
| Iridium 21 | LM-700A | 1997-07-09, 13:04 | Delta II 7920-10C | Vandenberg SLC-2W | Iridium | Failed | |
| Iridium 22 | LM-700A | 1997-08-21, 00:38 | Delta II 7920-10C | Vandenberg SLC-2W | Iridium | Active | |
| Iridium 23 | LM-700A | 1997-08-21, 00:38 | Delta II 7920-10C | Vandenberg SLC-2W | Iridium | Failed | |
| Iridium 24 | LM-700A | 1997-08-21, 00:38 | Delta II 7920-10C | Vandenberg SLC-2W | Iridium | Active | |
| Iridium 25 | LM-700A | 1997-08-21, 00:38 | Delta II 7920-10C | Vandenberg SLC-2W | Iridium | Active | |
| Iridium 26 | LM-700A | 1997-08-21, 00:38 | Delta II 7920-10C | Vandenberg SLC-2W | Iridium | Active | |
| Iridium 27 | LM-700A | 1997-09-14, 01:36 | Proton-K/DM2 | Baikonur Site 81/23 | Iridium | Failed | |
| Iridium 28 | LM-700A | 1997-09-14, 01:36 | Proton-K/DM2 | Baikonur Site 81/23 | Iridium | Retired | Failed in July 2008, past end of design life |
| Iridium 29 | LM-700A | 1997-09-14, 01:36 | Proton-K/DM2 | Baikonur Site 81/23 | Iridium | Active | |
| Iridium 30 | LM-700A | 1997-09-14, 01:36 | Proton-K/DM2 | Baikonur Site 81/23 | Iridium | Active | |
| Iridium 31 | LM-700A | 1997-09-14, 01:36 | Proton-K/DM2 | Baikonur Site 81/23 | Iridium | Active | |
| Iridium 32 | LM-700A | 1997-09-14, 01:36 | Proton-K/DM2 | Baikonur Site 81/23 | Iridium | Active | |
| Iridium 33 | LM-700A | 1997-09-14, 01:36 | Proton-K/DM2 | Baikonur Site 81/23 | Iridium | Destroyed | Collided with Kosmos-2251 in February 2009, past end of design life |
| Iridium 34 | LM-700A | 1997-09-27, 01:23 | Delta II 7920-10C | Vandenberg SLC-2W | Iridium | Active | |
| Iridium 35 | LM-700A | 1997-09-27, 01:23 | Delta II 7920-10C | Vandenberg SLC-2W | Iridium | Active | |
| Iridium 36 | LM-700A | 1997-09-27, 01:23 | Delta II 7920-10C | Vandenberg SLC-2W | Iridium | Active | |
| Iridium 37 | LM-700A | 1997-09-27, 01:23 | Delta II 7920-10C | Vandenberg SLC-2W | Iridium | Active | |
| Iridium 38 | LM-700A | 1997-11-09, 01:34 | Delta II 7920-10C | Vandenberg SLC-2W | Iridium | Active | |
| Iridium 39 | LM-700A | 1997-11-09, 01:34 | Delta II 7920-10C | Vandenberg SLC-2W | Iridium | Active | |
| Iridium 40 | LM-700A | 1997-11-09, 01:34 | Delta II 7920-10C | Vandenberg SLC-2W | Iridium | Active | |
| Iridium 41 | LM-700A | 1997-11-09, 01:34 | Delta II 7920-10C | Vandenberg SLC-2W | Iridium | Active | |
| Iridium 42 | LM-700A | 1997-12-08, 07:16 | Long March 2C-III/SD | Taiyuan LC-1 | Iridium | Active | |
| Iridium 43 | LM-700A | 1997-11-09, 01:34 | Delta II 7920-10C | Vandenberg SLC-2W | Iridium | Active | |
| Iridium 44 | LM-700A | 1997-12-08, 07:16 | Long March 2C-III/SD | Taiyuan LC-1 | Iridium | Active | |
| Iridium 45 | LM-700A | 1997-12-20, 13:16 | Delta II 7920-10C | Vandenberg SLC-2W | Iridium | Active | |
| Iridium 46 | LM-700A | 1997-12-20, 13:16 | Delta II 7920-10C | Vandenberg SLC-2W | Iridium | Active | |
| Iridium 47 | LM-700A | 1997-12-20, 13:16 | Delta II 7920-10C | Vandenberg SLC-2W | Iridium | Active | |
| Iridium 48 | LM-700A | 1997-12-20, 13:16 | Delta II 7920-10C | Vandenberg SLC-2W | Iridium | Active | |
| Iridium 49 | LM-700A | 1997-12-20, 13:16 | Delta II 7920-10C | Vandenberg SLC-2W | Iridium | Active | |
| Iridium 50 | LM-700A | 1998-02-18, 13:58 | Delta II 7920-10C | Vandenberg SLC-2W | Iridium | Active | |
| Iridium 51 | LM-700A | 1998-03-25, 17:01 | Long March 2C-III/SD | Taiyuan LC-1 | Iridium | Active | |
| Iridium 52 | LM-700A | 1998-02-18, 13:58 | Delta II 7920-10C | Vandenberg SLC-2W | Iridium | Active | |
| Iridium 53 | LM-700A | 1998-02-18, 13:58 | Delta II 7920-10C | Vandenberg SLC-2W | Iridium | Active | |
| Iridium 54 | LM-700A | 1998-02-18, 13:58 | Delta II 7920-10C | Vandenberg SLC-2W | Iridium | Active | |
| Iridium 55 | LM-700A | 1998-03-30, 06:02 | Delta II 7920-10C | Vandenberg SLC-2W | Iridium | Active | |
| Iridium 56 | LM-700A | 1998-02-18, 13:58 | Delta II 7920-10C | Vandenberg SLC-2W | Iridium | Active | |
| Iridium 57 | LM-700A | 1998-03-30, 06:02 | Delta II 7920-10C | Vandenberg SLC-2W | Iridium | Active | |
| Iridium 58 | LM-700A | 1998-03-30, 06:02 | Delta II 7920-10C | Vandenberg SLC-2W | Iridium | Active | |
| Iridium 59 | LM-700A | 1998-03-30, 06:02 | Delta II 7920-10C | Vandenberg SLC-2W | Iridium | Active | |
| Iridium 60 | LM-700A | 1998-03-30, 06:02 | Delta II 7920-10C | Vandenberg SLC-2W | Iridium | Active | |
| Iridium 61 | LM-700A | 1998-03-25, 17:01 | Long March 2C-III/SD | Taiyuan LC-1 | Iridium | Active | |
| Iridium 62 | LM-700A | 1998-04-07, 02:13 | Proton-K/DM2 | Baikonur Site 81/23 | Iridium | Active | |
| Iridium 63 | LM-700A | 1998-04-07, 02:13 | Proton-K/DM2 | Baikonur Site 81/23 | Iridium | Active | |
| Iridium 64 | LM-700A | 1998-04-07, 02:13 | Proton-K/DM2 | Baikonur Site 81/23 | Iridium | Active | |
| Iridium 65 | LM-700A | 1998-04-07, 02:13 | Proton-K/DM2 | Baikonur Site 81/23 | Iridium | Active | |
| Iridium 66 | LM-700A | 1998-04-07, 02:13 | Proton-K/DM2 | Baikonur Site 81/23 | Iridium | Active | |
| Iridium 67 | LM-700A | 1998-04-07, 02:13 | Proton-K/DM2 | Baikonur Site 81/23 | Iridium | Active | |
| Iridium 68 | LM-700A | 1998-04-07, 02:13 | Proton-K/DM2 | Baikonur Site 81/23 | Iridium | Active | |
| Iridium 69 | LM-700A | 1998-05-02, 09:16 | Long March 2C-III/SD | Taiyuan LC-1 | Iridium | Active | |
| Iridium 70 | LM-700A | 1998-05-17, 21:16 | Delta II 7920-10C | Vandenberg SLC-2W | Iridium | Active | |
| Iridium 71 | LM-700A | 1998-05-02, 09:16 | Long March 2C-III/SD | Taiyuan LC-1 | Iridium | Active | |
| Iridium 72 | LM-700A | 1998-05-17, 21:16 | Delta II 7920-10C | Vandenberg SLC-2W | Iridium | Active | |
| Iridium 73 | LM-700A | 1998-05-17, 21:16 | Delta II 7920-10C | Vandenberg SLC-2W | Iridium | Active | |
| Iridium 74 | LM-700A | 1998-05-17, 21:16 | Delta II 7920-10C | Vandenberg SLC-2W | Iridium | Active | |
| Iridium 75 | LM-700A | 1998-05-17, 21:16 | Delta II 7920-10C | Vandenberg SLC-2W | Iridium | Active | |
| Iridium 76 | LM-700A | 1998-08-19, 23:01 | Long March 2C-III/SD | Taiyuan LC-1 | Iridium | Active | |
| Iridium 77 | LM-700A | 1998-09-08, 21:13 | Delta II 7920-10C | Vandenberg SLC-2W | Iridium | Active | |
| Iridium 78 | LM-700A | N/A | | | Iridium | Not launched | |
| Iridium 79 | LM-700A | 1998-09-08, 21:13 | Delta II 7920-10C | Vandenberg SLC-2W | Iridium | Active | |
| Iridium 80 | LM-700A | 1998-09-08, 21:13 | Delta II 7920-10C | Vandenberg SLC-2W | Iridium | Active | |
| Iridium 81 | LM-700A | 1998-09-08, 21:13 | Delta II 7920-10C | Vandenberg SLC-2W | Iridium | Active | |
| Iridium 82 | LM-700A | 1998-09-08, 21:13 | Delta II 7920-10C | Vandenberg SLC-2W | Iridium | Active | |
| Iridium 83 | LM-700A | 1998-11-06, 13:37 | Delta II 7920-10C | Vandenberg SLC-2W | Iridium | Active | |
| Iridium 84 | LM-700A | 1998-11-06, 13:37 | Delta II 7920-10C | Vandenberg SLC-2W | Iridium | Active | |
| Iridium 85 | LM-700A | 1998-11-06, 13:37 | Delta II 7920-10C | Vandenberg SLC-2W | Iridium | Active | |
| Iridium 86 | LM-700A | 1998-11-06, 13:37 | Delta II 7920-10C | Vandenberg SLC-2W | Iridium | Active | |
| Iridium 87 | LM-700A | 1998-11-06, 13:37 | Delta II 7920-10C | Vandenberg SLC-2W | Iridium | Active | |
| SBIRS-LADS | LM-700B | N/A | Athena II | Vandenberg SLC-6 | USAF | Not launched | |

== See also ==
- Orbcomm (satellite)
