= Iridium 7 =

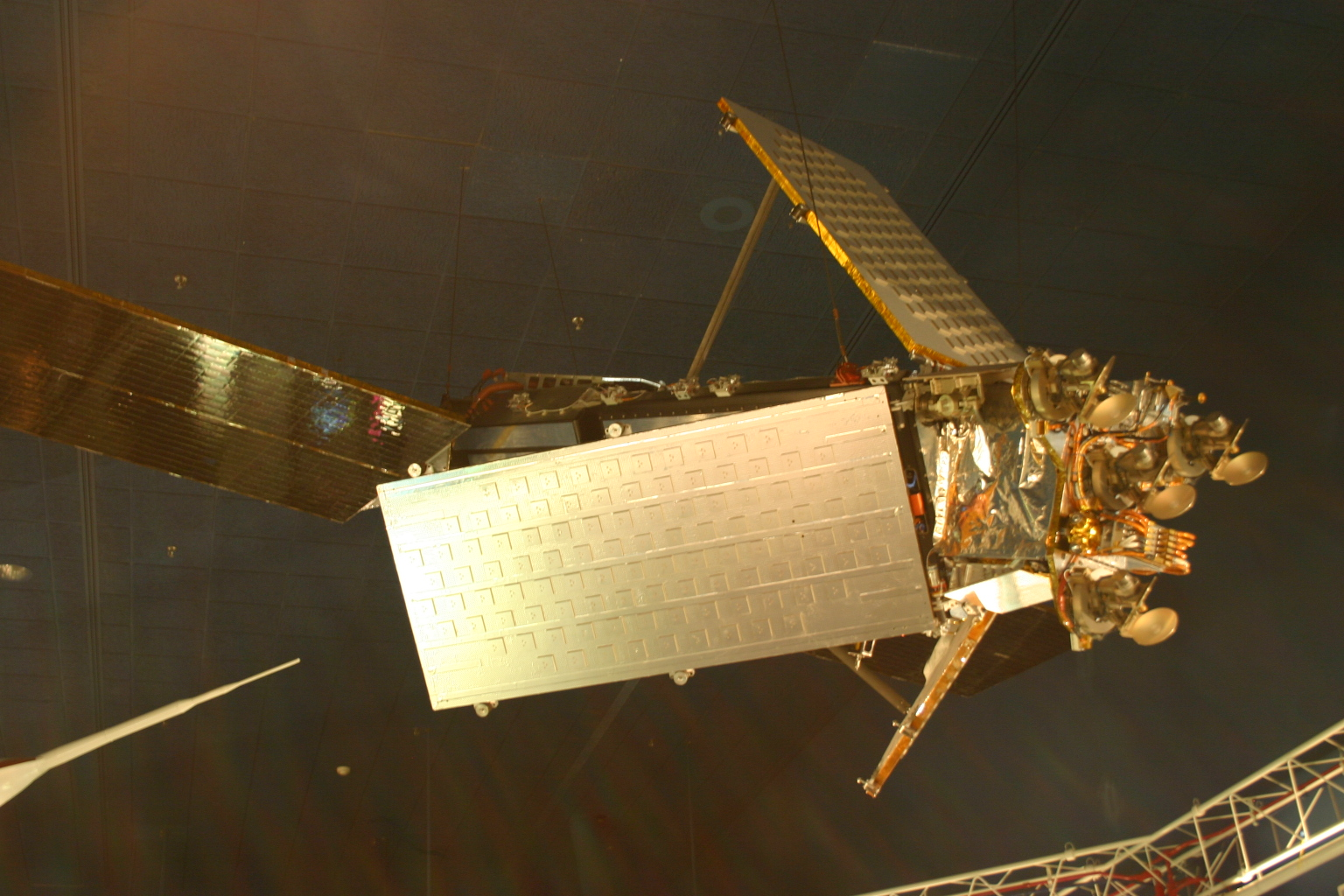
- A mockup of an Iridium satellite
- Mission type: Communication
- Operator: Iridium Satellite LLC
- COSPAR ID: 1997-020B
- SATCAT no.: 24793

Spacecraft properties
- Bus: LM-700A
- Manufacturer: Lockheed Martin

Start of mission
- Launch date: 5 May 1997
- Rocket: Delta II 7920-10C
- Launch site: Vandenberg SLC-2W

Orbital parameters
- Reference system: Geocentric
- Regime: Low Earth

Iridium 7 was a U.S. Iridium communications satellite. It was launched into low Earth orbit from Vandenberg Air Force Base at 14:55 GMT on 5 May 1997, by a Delta II 7920-10C carrier rocket. It was operated in Plane 4 of the Iridium satellite constellation, with an ascending node of 262.4°.

It had a partial technical failure in 2009 and was subsequently paired with Iridium 51, and relegated to following it and managing traffic routing.

== See also ==
- 1997 in spaceflight
