= Raymond J. Leopold =

Satellite engineer

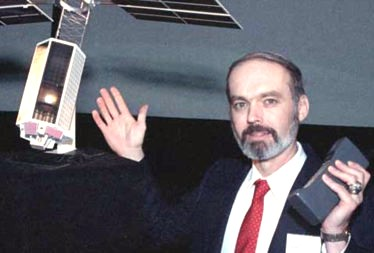
- Born: January 6, 1946 (age 80); Chicago, Illinois
- Education: United States Air Force Academy; North Carolina State University; University of New Mexico
- Engineering career
- Employer: Motorola
- Projects: Iridium satellite constellation

Raymond J. Leopold is one of the three engineers who in late 1987 conceived of and later designed the Iridium satellite constellation, the first realization of global, wireless, personal communications.

== Career ==
Leopold joined Motorola in 1987 after having spent a career in the U.S. Air Force where he held a variety of technical and technical management positions. He directed the development of communications systems at the Electronics Systems Division in Massachusetts. He served two tours in The Pentagon, one in the Office of the Secretary of Defense and one on the Air Staff. He taught for over five years at the United States Air Force Academy in Colorado, and worked in research and development for four years at the Air Force Weapons Laboratory in Albuquerque. He was also an adjunct professor of electrical engineering at George Washington University, and he had been a senior lecturer at MIT and had chaired the Industry Advisory Board for the Aero/Astro Department. He has also lectured at Stanford University.

== Education ==
Leopold earned three degrees in electrical engineering, a bachelor's degree from the United States Air Force Academy in 1967, a master's degree from North Carolina State University in 1968, and a Ph.D. from the University of New Mexico in 1973. He was also honored with a Doctor of Telecommunications Management Degree from South Dakota School of Mines and Technology in 1997. He has completed Executive Education courses at the Harvard Business School, MIT (Sloan), The University of California (Berkeley), The Center for Creative Leadership, and The Defense Systems Management College.

== Iridium satellite constellation ==
The Iridium system integrates a packet-switched architecture within its globally deployed constellation of satellites together with the circuit-switched architecture of the public switched telephone network. It was created by Leopold and Bary Bertiger and Ken Peterson.

== Awards and honors ==
- Pioneer Award, Mobile Satellite Users' Association, May 2008 (with Bary Bertiger and Ken Peterson) "... for the Invention of the Iridium Satellite System"
- Laureate for Space, Aviation Week and Space Technology, March 1997 "for the Invention of the Iridium (Satellite) Personal Communications System (with Bary Bertiger and Ken Peterson)
- Biennial Communications Award, American Institute of Aeronautical and Astronautical Engineers (AIAA), May 1998 "...for inventing LEO Mobile Communications, IRIDIUM Satellite System, and for developing systems architecture, directing systems engineering, creating global TDMA/FDMA telephony concept, and initiating a multibillion-dollar business." (with Bary Bertiger and Ken Peterson)
- The IEEE Third Millennium Medal, Institute of Electrical & Electronics Engineers (IEEE), March 2000 "... for leadership in the field of wireless communications."
- Fellow of the IEEE, Institute of Electrical & Electronics Engineers (IEEE), January 1997 “...for leadership and contributions to worldwide satellite communications and personal wireless.”
- Dan Noble Fellow, Motorola, Inc., November 1995, Motorola’s Highest Technical Award “... for leadership in creative and innovative technical contributions and, in particular, for his role in co-inventing the overall Iridium satellite cellular communications system and in gaining its critical global backing.”

== Publications ==
- Motorola's IRIDIUM system: low-Earth orbit global cellular communications network, R. J. Leopold, Antennas and Propagation Society International Symposium, 1992.
- The Iridium Communications Systems, R. J. Leopold, Singapore ICCS/ISITA '92. 'Communications on the Move', 1992.
- The IRIDIUM communications system, R. J. Leopold; A. Miller, Microwave Symposium Digest, 1993.
- The IRIDIUM communications system, R. J. Leopold; A. Miller, IEEE Potentials,1993.
- The IRIDIUM TM/SM1 Personal Communication System, M. Borota; K. Johnson; R. J. Leopold; A. Miller, VLSI Circuits, 1994.
- Low-earth orbit global cellular communications network, R. J. Leopold, Communications, 1991.
- CELESTRITM Ka-Band sharing, R. J. Leopold, Aerospace Conference, 1998.

== Gallery ==
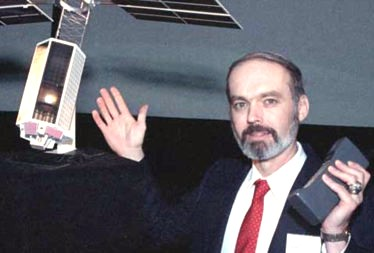
Dr. Leopold showing an Iridium Satellite model and Iridium Satellite Phone.

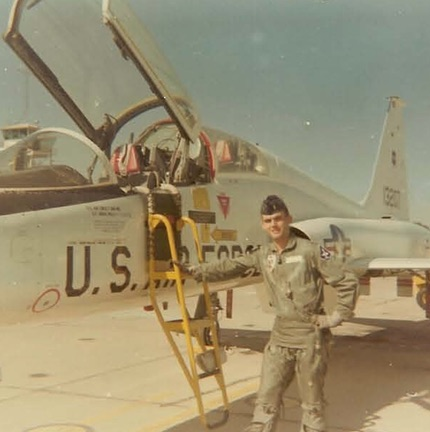
Ray Leopold pictured with a T-38.
