= Iridium Communications =

American satellite communications company

Iridium Communications Inc.
- Type: Public
- Traded as: Nasdaq: IRDM; S&P 600 component
- Industry: Satellite telecommunications
- Founded: 2001; 25 years ago
- Headquarters: McLean, Virginia, U.S.
- Area served: Worldwide
- Key people: Matthew J. Desch (CEO); Vincent J. O'Neill (CFO); Suzanne E. McBride (COO)
- Products: Satellite communications equipment
- Services: Satellite voice and data services
- Revenue: ▲US$871.7 million (2025)
- Operating income: ▲US$236.0 million (2025)
- Net income: ▲US$114.4 million (2025)
- Total assets: ▼US$2.531 billion (2025)
- Total equity: ▼US$462.6 million (2025)
- Number of employees: 975 (2025)
- Website: iridium.com

Iridium Communications Inc. is a publicly traded American satellite communications company headquartered in McLean, Virginia. Its principal operating subsidiary is Iridium Satellite LLC. Iridium operates the Iridium satellite constellation, a system of 80 satellites: 66 are operational satellites and fourteen function as in-orbit spares. Iridium satellites are used for worldwide voice and data communication from handheld satellite phones, satellite messenger communication devices and integrated transceivers. The company is also developing standards-based direct-to-device satellite connectivity for conventional mobile and Internet of things devices. Iridium's satellites also host the space-based Automatic Dependent Surveillance–Broadcast (ADS-B) receivers operated by Aireon, which became a wholly owned subsidiary of Iridium in 2026. The nearly polar orbits and communication between satellites via inter-satellite links provide global service availability.

== History ==
The Iridium communications service was launched on November 1, 1998, formerly known as Iridium SSC. The first Iridium call was made from Vice President of the United States Al Gore to Gilbert M. Grosvenor, the great-grandson of Alexander Graham Bell and chairman of the National Geographic Society. Motorola provided the technology and major financial backing. The logo of the company represents the Big Dipper. The company derives its name from the chemical element iridium, which has an atomic number of 77, equaling the initial number of satellites which were calculated to be required for global coverage. However, due to optimizations of orbit trajectories, technology updates and real-world conditions, only 66 are required for global coverage. A total of 95 first-generation satellites were launched.

On August 13, 1999, nine months after the launch of the organization, the founding company went into Chapter 11 bankruptcy. The handsets could not operate as promoted until the entire constellation of satellites was in place, requiring a massive initial capital cost of billions of dollars. The cost of service dissuaded many potential users. Reception indoors was difficult and the handheld devices, when compared to terrestrial cellular mobile phones, were bulkier and more expensive, both of which discouraged adoption among potential users.

Mismanagement is another major factor that was cited in the original program's failure. In 1999, CNN writer David Rohde detailed how he applied for Iridium service and was sent information kits, but was never contacted by a sales representative. He encountered programming problems on Iridium's website, and a "run-around" from the company's representatives. After Iridium filed bankruptcy, it cited "difficulty gaining subscribers."

The initial commercial failure of Iridium had a damping effect on other proposed commercial satellite constellation projects, including Teledesic. Other schemes (Orbcomm, ICO Global Communications, and Globalstar) followed Iridium into bankruptcy protection, while a number of other proposed schemes were never even constructed.

In August 2000, Motorola announced that the Iridium satellites would have to be deorbited. Despite this, they remained in orbit and operational. In December 2000, the US government stepped in to save Iridium by providing US$72 million in exchange for a two-year contract. They also approved the fire sale of the company from US bankruptcy court for $25 million in March 2001. This erased over $4 billion in debt.

Iridium service was restarted in 2001, by the newly founded Iridium Satellite LLC, which was owned by a group of private investors.

On February 10, 2009, the Iridium 33 satellite collided with a defunct Russian satellite, named Kosmos 2251, 800 kilometres (500 mi) over Siberia. Two large debris clouds were created.

=== Iridium NEXT launch campaign ===
Iridium replaced its original constellation by sending 75 new Iridium satellites into space on SpaceX Falcon 9 rockets in a series of 8 launches. The campaign also consisted of upgrades to Iridium ground infrastructure.

The Iridium NEXT launch campaign was announced in 2007. Within three years, Iridium completed financing and began work on launching new satellites. In June 2010, Iridium announced a fixed-price contract with Thales Alenia Space for the design and construction of the next-generation satellites for the upgraded constellation. Two weeks later, Iridium announced a $492 million contract designating the Falcon 9 as a major provider of launch services for the Iridium NEXT campaign, becoming the largest single commercial launch deal ever signed (simultaneously representing a benchmark in cost-effective satellite delivery to space). The total expenditures of approximately $2.9 billion were partially financed with debt: between 2010 and 2017, the debt of Iridium Communications Inc. grew from $37.4 millions to $1,455.6 millions.

On January 14, 2017, 10 years after the campaign was first announced, the first of eight Iridium NEXT launches took place with SpaceX from Vandenberg Air Force Base in California. Over the next two years, Iridium sent an additional 65 satellites into low Earth orbit to completely replace the original satellite constellation. The final Iridium NEXT launch took place on January 11, 2019, less than two years after the first launch.

The Iridium NEXT network initially consisted of 66 operational satellites and nine in-orbit spares. Five additional ground spare satellites were launched on May 20, 2023, increasing the deployed constellation to 80 satellites, including 14 in-orbit spares.

== Present status ==
Iridium Communications Inc. was incorporated as GHL Acquisition Corp., a special-purpose acquisition company, in November 2007 and became publicly held in 2008. In September 2009, it acquired the outstanding equity of Iridium Holdings LLC and changed its name to Iridium Communications Inc. Iridium Satellite LLC remains the company's principal operating subsidiary. The public company trades on Nasdaq under the symbol "IRDM".

As of June 30, 2026, Iridium had 2.627 million billable subscribers worldwide. Iridium operates its satellite constellation from a network operations center in Leesburg, Virginia. Its primary commercial gateway is in Tempe, Arizona, with another gateway in Izhevsk, Russia for traffic within Russian boundaries. The United States government operates a separate dedicated gateway compatible with the Iridium network.

On June 29, 2026, Rocket Lab and Iridium announced a definitive agreement under which Rocket Lab would acquire Iridium in a cash-and-stock transaction with an enterprise value of approximately $8 billion. Under the agreement, Iridium shareholders would receive $27 in cash and Rocket Lab shares with a notional combined value of $54 for each Iridium share. The transaction is expected to close in mid-2027, subject to Iridium shareholder approval, regulatory approvals and other closing conditions.

Iridium provides satellite services to the U.S. government, which owns and operates a dedicated gateway for the network. The company provides most of its U.S. government airtime under its multi-year Enhanced Mobile Satellite Services contract and also provides gateway maintenance and engineering services under contracts managed by the United States Space Force.

=== Hosted Payload Alliance ===
Iridium is a founding member of the Hosted Payload Alliance (HPA), a satellite industry alliance program. Membership in the HPA is open to satellite operators, satellite manufacturers, system integrators, and other interested parties.

=== Air safety communications ===
In July 2011, the Federal Aviation Administration (FAA) issued a ruling that approves the use of Iridium for Future Air Navigation System (FANS) data links, enabling satellite data links with air-traffic control for aircraft flying in the FANS environment, including areas not served by Inmarsat (above or below 70 degrees latitude) which includes polar routes.

=== Aireon and space-based ADS-B ===
Iridium formed Aireon in 2011 to develop a global air traffic surveillance service using space-based Automatic Dependent Surveillance–Broadcast (ADS-B), with several air navigation service providers later investing in the company. ADS-B receivers operated by Aireon are hosted aboard the Iridium NEXT satellites. They receive position broadcasts from equipped aircraft and relay the data through the Iridium network, allowing air navigation service providers to monitor aircraft over oceans, polar areas and other regions outside conventional ground-based surveillance coverage. Aireon's space-based ADS-B system became operational in 2019.

Iridium held an approximately 39% fully diluted interest in Aireon before agreeing in May 2026 to acquire the remaining 61% for approximately $366.7 million. The acquisition closed on July 2, 2026, making Aireon a wholly owned subsidiary of Iridium.

=== Global Maritime Distress and Safety System ===
In January 2020, the Iridium constellation was certified for use in the Global Maritime Distress and Safety System (GMDSS). The certification ended a monopoly on the provision of maritime distress services that had previously been held by Inmarsat since the system became operational in 1999.

=== Adoption of standard-based solutions for cellphones ===
In 2023, Qualcomm and Iridium announced an agreement that was supposed to bring two-way satellite messaging service to Android smartphones. The service, called Snapdragon Satellite, should have been supported starting with devices that feature Snapdragon 8 Gen 2 chipsets, which was expected to be launched in the second half of 2023. The solution for smartphones was supposed to utilize Iridium's L Band spectrum for downlink and uplink.

On November 9, 2023, Iridium announced that Qualcomm had notified them about the end of their partnership due to a lack of interest in Qualcomm's and Iridium's proprietary solution by smartphone manufacturers. A Qualcomm spokesman stated "Smartphone makers have indicated a preference towards standards-based solutions for satellite-to-phone connectivity. We expect to continue to collaborate with Iridium on standards-based solutions while discontinuing efforts on the proprietary solution that was introduced earlier this year."

In 2024, Iridium announced Project Stardust, an effort to develop standards-based satellite connectivity using 3GPP specifications for 5G non-terrestrial networks (NTN). The project was subsequently developed as Iridium NTN Direct, a standards-based service intended to support direct-to-device connectivity and low-cost Internet of things applications. As of July 2026, Iridium was conducting live over-the-air demonstrations with mobile network operators, semiconductor companies and other partners, and said it expected to introduce NTN Direct later in 2026.

== Russo-Ukrainian War ==
Following the 2022 Russian invasion of Ukraine, Iridium adjusted its operations to comply with United States and international sanctions and stopped shipments of end-user equipment to Russia. Iridium nevertheless continued providing satellite communications services in Russia through two local subsidiaries and authorized Russian service providers. As of 2025, its Russian operations employed approximately 40 people and used a dedicated gateway in Izhevsk. Revenue from operations in Russia represented approximately 2% of Iridium's total revenue in each year from 2023 through 2025.

In 2023, Euromaidan Press, citing an investigation by the Ukrainian watchdog Trap Aggressor, reported that Iridium equipment and services had been used by Russian military organizations. The investigation alleged that Iridium's Russian subsidiary had provided access to the satellite network to the National Guard of Russia in 2022 and that Iridium equipment continued to enter Russia through intermediaries in 2023. Iridium told the publication that it did not condone use of its technology in Russian military drones, requested identifying information so that it could investigate the reported use, and said its partners were contractually required to comply with applicable sanctions.

== Iridium satellite constellation ==
The Iridium system uses 66 operational satellites in low Earth orbit, with 14 additional satellites serving as in-orbit spares. The operational satellites are arranged in six nearly polar orbital planes with 11 operational satellites per plane, at an altitude of approximately 485 miles (780 km). Satellites communicate with neighboring satellites through intersatellite links using K-band spectrum at 23 GHz. Ka-band frequencies are used for feeder links between the satellites and Iridium's ground stations. The original constellation was launched in the late 1990s before the company went through bankruptcy. In January 2017, Iridium began to launch its next-generation satellites through its approximately $3 billion launch campaign, Iridium NEXT. The new satellites were sent into space on SpaceX Falcon 9 launch vehicles from Vandenberg AFB Space Launch Complex 4 in California over the course of eight launches between January 2017 and January 2019. On January 14, 2017, SpaceX launched 10 of the new Iridium satellites into orbit. The second launch of Iridium NEXT satellites took place on June 25, 2017 on a SpaceX Falcon 9 rocket out of Vandenberg Space Force Base. This was the second of eight scheduled launches. The third launch of 10 NEXT satellites took place on October 9, 2017. On December 22, 2017, ten additional satellites were deployed after a successful launch on a SpaceX Falcon 9 rocket. On May 22, SpaceX successfully launched an additional five Iridium NEXT satellites from Vandenberg Space Force Base.

On January 11, 2019, the final ten satellites were placed in orbit by SpaceX.

== Subscriber equipment ==
=== Handsets ===
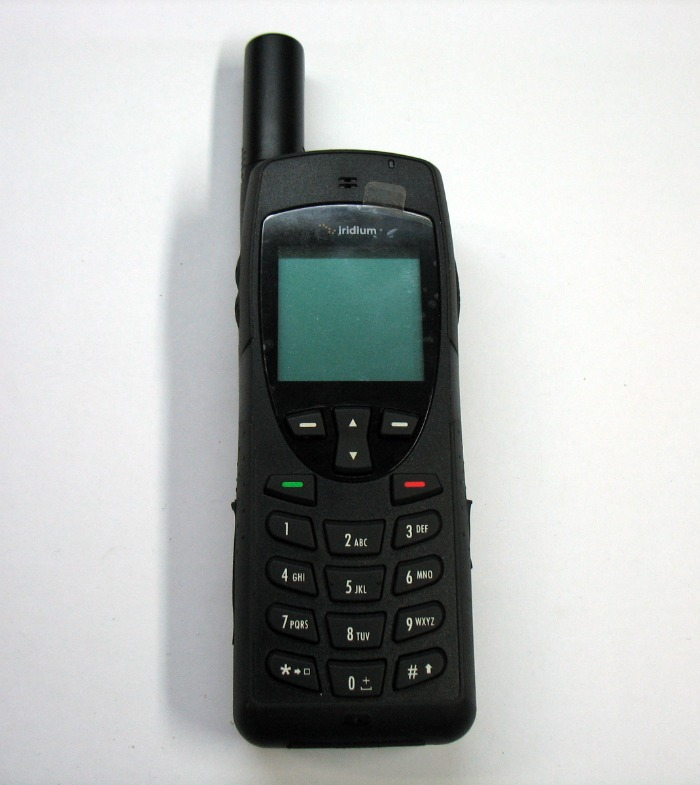
Iridium 9555

Iridium offers four satellite handsets: the 9555, 9575A (which is only available to US government customers), the Extreme, and the Extreme PTT.

=== Wi-Fi Hotspots ===
In 2014, Iridium began to offer the Iridium Go! hotspot, which can also be used as a distress beacon under certain circumstances. As of September 2020, Iridium's manufacturing contractor, Beam Communications, had built 50,000 of these devices.

=== One-way pagers ===
Two pagers were made for the Iridium network – the Motorola 9501 and Kyocera SP-66K. These are one-way devices that could receive messages sent in the form of SMS.

Messages are delivered to pre-selected "MDAs" which cover a certain geographic area. Three of these MDAs may be selected on a web-based portal or updated automatically if the paging service is bound to an Iridium phone. Each country has its own MDA based on its country code; some of the larger countries are divided into several MDAs, while separate MDAs exist for sections of ocean and common aeronautic routes.

Pagers are assigned with telephone numbers in area code 480 and can also be contacted using email, SMS and the web-based interface used to send messages to Iridium phones.

=== Two-way satellite messengers ===
In 2017, Garmin announced inReach SE+ and inReach Explorer+ satellite communicators, which use Iridium satellite network for global coverage. The Garmin inReach Mini, a satellite messenger, was announced a year later. These devices can send and receive text messages with any cell phone number, email address or another inReach device, as well as to provide location sharing, navigation and direct communication options to emergency services.

ZOLEO satellite communicator uses global Iridium network when cellular or Wi-Fi coverage is unavailable. It does so by means of Bluetooth connection to provide two-way messaging to connected smartphone or tablet devices.

=== Other satellite phones ===
Several other Iridium-based telephones exist, such as payphones, and equipment intended for installation on ships and aircraft. The DPL handset made by NAL Research combined with a 9522 transceiver is used for some of these products. This handset provides a user interface nearly identical to that of the 9505 series phones.

=== Standalone transceiver units ===
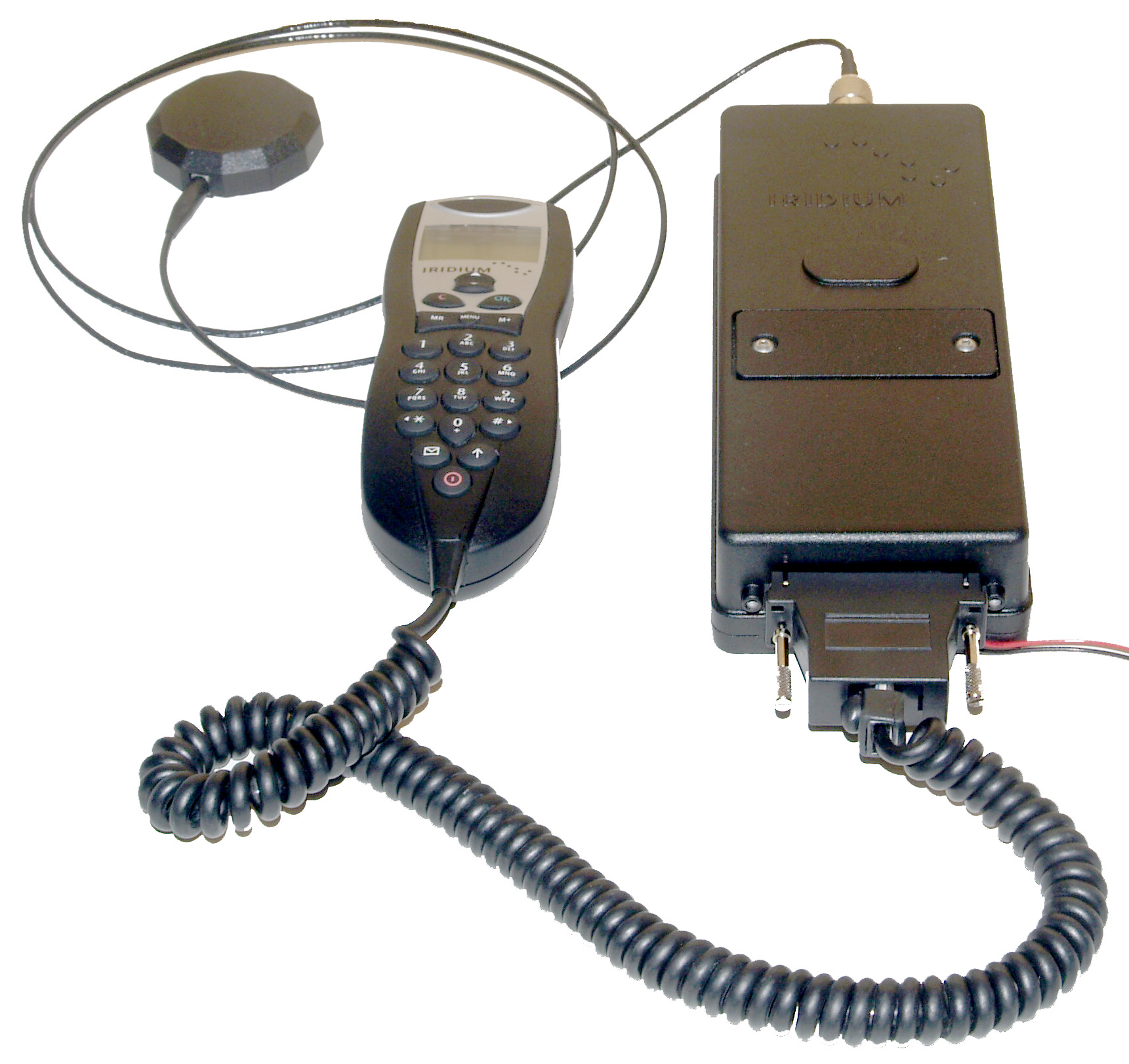
Iridium 9522A

These can be used for data-logging applications in remote areas (as in data collection satellites). Some types of buoys, such as those used for the tsunami warning system, use Iridium satellites to communicate with their base. The remote device is programmed to call or send short burst data (SBD) messages to the base at specified intervals, or it can be set to accept calls in order for it to offload its collected data.

The following transceivers have been released over the years:

- Iridium Core 9523 – Similar to the 9522B, a modular transceiver released in 2012
- Iridium 9522B – A transceiver released in late 2008, is smaller than the 9522A and has similar features. It also supports Circuit-Switched Data (CSD), not just SBD.
- Iridium 9522A – Based on the 9522, some variants have built in GPS and autonomous reporting functions. Supports SBD.
- Motorola 9522 – Last Motorola transceiver, supports outgoing SMS but no SBD.
- Motorola 9520 – Original transceiver module, does not support outgoing SMS or SBD. Designed for use in vehicles with accompanying handset

==== Short burst data modems ====
These devices support only SBD for Internet of things (IoT) services and do not use a SIM card.

- Iridium 9601 – Supports only SBD, several tracking devices and other products have been built around this modem. It was an Iridium manufactured product designed as an OEM module for integration into applications that only use the Iridium Short Burst Data Service. Short Burst Data applications are supported through an RS-232 interface. Examples of these applications include maritime vessel tracking or automatic vehicle tracking.
- Iridium 9602 – Smaller, cheaper version of 9601 (released in 2010).
- Iridium 9603 – One-fourth the volume and half the footprint of 9602

=== Iridium OpenPort ===
Iridium OpenPort is a broadband satellite voice and data communications system for maritime vessels. The system is used for crew calling and e-mail services on sea vessels such as merchant fleets, government and navy vessels, fishing fleets and personal yachts.

Iridium OpenPort provided an IP-based data connection with user-selectable data rates from 9.6 to 128 kbit/s, together with up to three simultaneous telephone circuits.

=== Iridium Certus ===
One of the Iridium NEXT services is Iridium Certus, a globally available satellite broadband which is capable of up to 704 Kbps of bandwidth across maritime, aviation, land mobile, government, and IoT applications. Terminals for the service are provided by Cobham, Intellian Technologies and Thales.

=== Iridium STL ===
Iridium provides Satellite Time & Location (STL) service. It was developed by Satelles, which was acquired by Iridium Communications in April 2024.

According to the company, it is the only LEO satellite-based commercial positioning, navigation, and timing (PNT) service (as of April 2024).

== See also ==
- Mobile-satellite service
- Broadband Global Area Network
- DeLorme
- Globalsat Group
- Globalstar
- Gonets
- Inmarsat
- OneWeb
- O3b Networks
- SES Broadband
- Sky and Space Global
- Starlink (SpaceX)
- Thuraya
- Quake Global
