= Globalsat Group =

- Type: Private consortium
- Industry: Satellite communications
- Founded: 1999
- Headquarters: Boca Raton, Florida, United States
- Area served: Americas
- Products: Mobile satellite service, Fixed satellite service, M2M/IoT
- Number of employees: 200+ (2026)
- Website: globalsat.com

Globalsat Group is a multinational telecommunications consortium specializing in mobile satellite services (MSS) and fixed satellite services (FSS), with operations across the Americas. Founded in 1999, the company is headquartered in Boca Raton, Florida, United States. It operates as an integrator of multiple satellite constellations and terrestrial networks, providing communications solutions to enterprise and government customers in remote and infrastructure-limited regions of North, Central, and South America.

Globalsat Group has been named Latin America Satellite Communications Company of the Year by Frost & Sullivan on three occasions (2016, 2017, and 2020).

== History ==
=== Founding and regional establishment (1999–2015) ===
Globalsat Group was founded in 1999 by J. Alberto Palacios, with an early focus on satellite communication solutions for the hydrocarbon and mining sectors in the Andean region. In its early years the company functioned as a regional provider of mobile satellite services, using L-band constellations such as Iridium and Inmarsat to reach customers in areas without terrestrial telecommunications infrastructure.

The company's initial business centered on the distribution of satellite phones and data terminals to enterprise clients in remote locations. Through the 2000s, Globalsat expanded beyond its original market, establishing regulatory presence and operational capacity in other South American countries. During this period the company also deployed Machine-to-Machine (M2M) and Internet of Things (IoT) solutions for industrial applications in Latin America.

=== Multi-orbit strategy and infrastructure modernization (2015–2023) ===
Through the 2010s and early 2020s, Globalsat Group expanded its service portfolio and geographic footprint across the Americas, establishing operational presence in the United States, Argentina, Bolivia, Brazil, Chile, Colombia, Mexico,Panama, Puerto Rico and Peru, with regulatory authorization and local operational capacity in multiple Latin American jurisdictions.

In 2016, Globalsat Group signed a strategic agreement with LeoSat Enterprises, which had planned a constellation of up to 108 low Earth orbit (LEO) satellites. Under the agreement, Globalsat was to provide market access and customer relationships while LeoSat supplied satellite infrastructure, and the company's leadership was appointed to LeoSat's Customer Technical Advisory Committee. LeoSat ceased operations in 2019 before deploying its constellation.

In December 2016, Globalsat Group obtained regulatory authorization for Inmarsat services throughout Mexico, including landing rights for Ka-band and L-band signals. In March 2017, the company was appointed a Tier 1 Enterprise Distribution Partner for Inmarsat Global.

In January 2020, Globalsat Group, Inmarsat, and Cobham signed a multi-year contract to provide satellite communications across the Brazilian railway network operated by Rumo, one of South America's largest rail operators. The project deployed hybrid satellite-terrestrial communications for rail infrastructure using BGAN connectivity.

In November 2023, Globalsat Group partnered with Rivada Space Networks to introduce Rivada's OuterNET system in Latin America. The OuterNET is designed as a private, low-latency LEO network using optical inter-satellite laser links.

=== Multi-orbit expansion and next-generation services (2024–2026) ===
In April 2025, Globalsat Group joined Viasat ELEVATE, Viasat's global enterprise partnership program, formalizing a technical relationship developed over several years.

In March 2026, Globalsat Group announced two strategic developments. The company signed an agreement to become an authorized reseller of Amazon Leo, Amazon's low-Earth orbit satellite broadband service (formerly Project Kuiper), across North, Central, and South America. Separately, Globalsat Group and Station Satcom announced the formation of Station Satcom Americas, a joint venture headquartered in Miami, Florida, to develop multi-orbit hybrid connectivity solutions for the maritime, offshore energy, mining, and logistics sectors.

In June 2026, Globalsat Group announced an expansion into the North American railway market, drawing on its experience from Brazilian railway projects, and was designated a sponsor of Railway Interchange 2026.

== Operations and service coverage ==
=== Geographic presence ===
Globalsat Group maintains operational presence and regulatory authorization in the United States, Argentina, Bolivia, Brazil, Chile, Colombia, Ecuador, Mexico, Panama, and Peru, and also operates through distribution networks in Central America and the Caribbean. This footprint allows the company to obtain landing rights for satellite signals across multiple jurisdictions and to provide localized support in Spanish, Portuguese, and English.

=== Industry applications ===
Globalsat Group serves sectors that require reliable communications in remote or infrastructure-limited environments, including mining and resource extraction, energy and oil and gas, transportation and logistics, maritime, government and defense, emergency response, and agriculture.

In the transportation sector, the company has deployed hybrid satellite-terrestrial systems for railway operators in Brazil, including Rumo and VLI. In 2025, Globalsat Group, through its Brazilian affiliate and in partnership with Viasat, began a ten-year modernization project for VLI Logística, deploying a hybrid satellite and LTE connectivity solution across more than 1,800 kilometers of track to support real-time fleet monitoring, signaling, and assisted operations.

In the emergency-response field, the company was the subject of a 2017 Mobile Satellite Users Association interview describing its deployment of mobile satellite services in Puerto Rico following Hurricane Maria.

== Satellite constellations and partnerships ==
Globalsat Group integrates services from multiple satellite constellations and terrestrial networks:

- Amazon Leo — As of March 2026, Globalsat Group serves as an authorized reseller of Amazon Leo for enterprise customers in the Americas. The service offers three terminal tiers: Leo Nano (portable, up to 100 Mbps), Leo Pro (up to 400 Mbps), and Leo Ultra (enterprise-grade, up to 1 Gbps download and 400 Mbps upload).
- Viasat – Inmarsat — L-band and Ka-band mobile and fixed satellite connectivity. Globalsat holds Inmarsat distribution licenses in multiple Latin American countries and is a Tier 1 Enterprise Distribution Partner. Through Viasat ELEVATE it integrates Viasat services into its offerings.
- Iridium Communications — L-band mobile satellite service via a constellation of approximately 66 LEO satellites. Globalsat functions as a Value Added Reseller for Iridium.
- Globalstar — L-band mobile satellite service across the Americas and other regions.
- Rivada OuterNET — A private LEO network using optical inter-satellite laser links, with commercial service anticipated in the coming years.

== Joint ventures ==
=== Station Satcom Americas ===
In March 2026, Globalsat Group and Station Satcom announced the formation of Station Satcom Americas (SSA), a joint venture headquartered in Miami, Florida. The venture combines Station Satcom's satellite infrastructure relationships with Globalsat Group's regional market experience, and focuses on multi-orbit hybrid connectivity solutions for the maritime, offshore energy, mining, and logistics sectors across the Americas.

== Awards and recognition ==
- Frost & Sullivan Latin America Satellite Communications Company of the Year — received in 2016, 2017, and 2020.
- Mobile Satellite Users Association (MSUA) Satellite Mobile Innovation Awards — Globalsat Group received the 2025 award for "Outstanding Leadership in Use of a Mobile Solution" for its interoperable satellite-terrestrial connectivity solution for VLI Multimodal in Brazil, and the 2024 ESG Impact Innovation Award.

== See also ==
- Iridium Communications
- Inmarsat
- Viasat
- Amazon Leo
- Communications satellite
- Low Earth orbit
- Machine to machine
- Internet of things
