= Iridium 33 =

Communications satellite operated by Iridium Communications

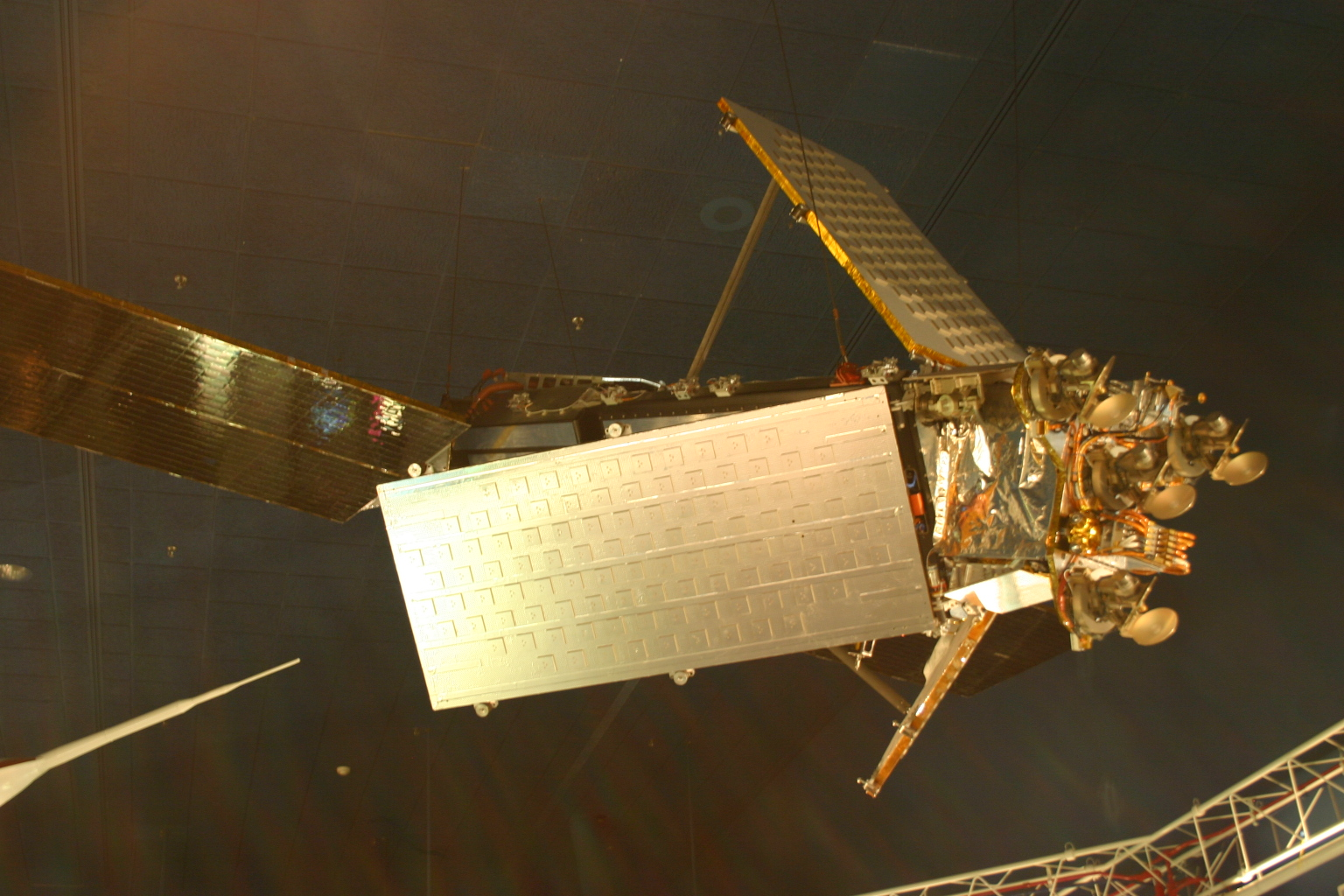
- A mockup of an Iridium satellite
- Mission type: Communication
- Operator: Iridium Satellite LLC
- COSPAR ID: 1997-051C
- SATCAT no.: 24946
- Mission duration: 11 years

Spacecraft properties
- Bus: LM-700A
- Manufacturer: Lockheed Martin
- Launch mass: 700 kg

Start of mission
- Launch date: 14 September 1997, 01:36 UTC
- Rocket: Proton-K / DM2
- Launch site: Baikonur, Site 81/23
- Contractor: Khrunichev via International Launch Services

End of mission
- Destroyed: 10 February 2009, 16:56 UTC; Collision with Kosmos 2251

Orbital parameters
- Reference system: Geocentric
- Regime: Low Earth
- Perigee altitude: 779.6 km
- Apogee altitude: 799.9 km
- Inclination: 86.4°
- Period: 100.4 minutes
- Epoch: 10 February 2009

Iridium 33 was a communications satellite launched by Russia for Iridium Communications. It was launched into low Earth orbit from Site 81/23 at the Baikonur Cosmodrome at 01:36 UTC on 14 September 1997, by a Proton-K rocket with a Block DM2 upper stage. The launch was arranged by International Launch Services (ILS). It was operated in Plane 3 of the Iridium satellite constellation, with an ascending node of 230.9°.

== Mission ==
Iridium 33 was part of a commercial communications network consisting of a constellation of 66 LEO spacecraft. The system uses L-Band to provide global communications services through portable handsets. Commercial service began in 1998. The system employs ground stations with a master control complex in Landsdowne, Virginia, a backup in Italy, and a third engineering center in Chandler, Arizona.

== Spacecraft ==
The spacecraft was 3-axis stabilized, with a hydrazine propulsion system. It had 2 solar panels with 1-axis articulation. The system employed L-Band using FDMA/TDMA to provide voice at 4.8 kbit/s and data at 2400 bit/s with a 16 dB margin. Each satellite had 48 spot beams for Earth coverage and used Ka-Band for crosslinks and ground commanding.

== Destruction ==
On 10 February 2009, at 16:56 UTC, at about 800 km altitude, Kosmos 2251 (1993-036A) (a derelict Strela satellite) and Iridium 33 collided, resulting in the destruction of both spacecraft. NASA reported that a large amount of space debris was produced by the collision, i.e. 1347 debris for Kosmos 2251 and 528 for Iridium 33.

== See also ==
- Kessler syndrome
