= Hypervelocity =

Very high velocity

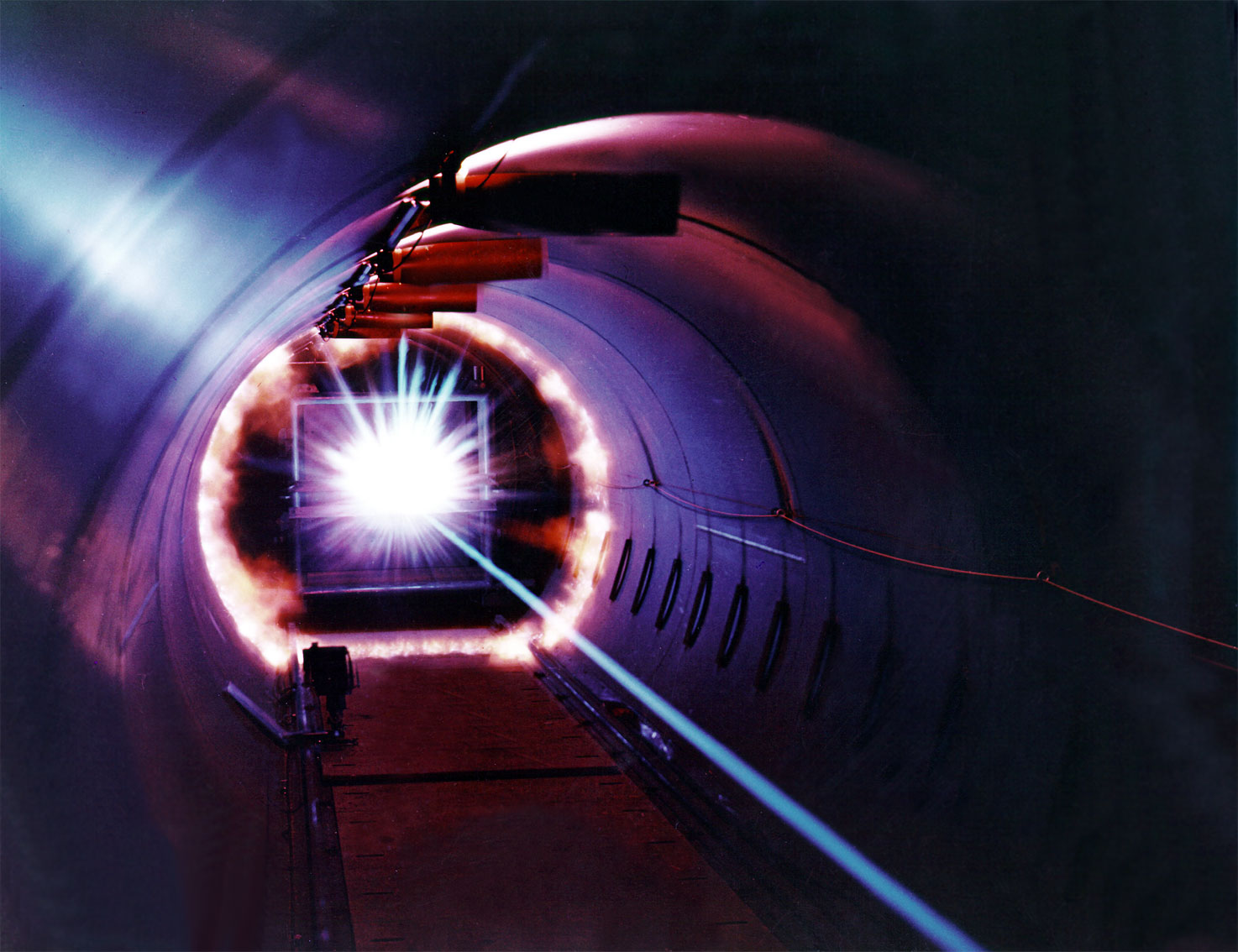
The "energy flash" of a hypervelocity impact during a laboratory simulation of what happens when a piece of orbital debris hits a spacecraft in orbit

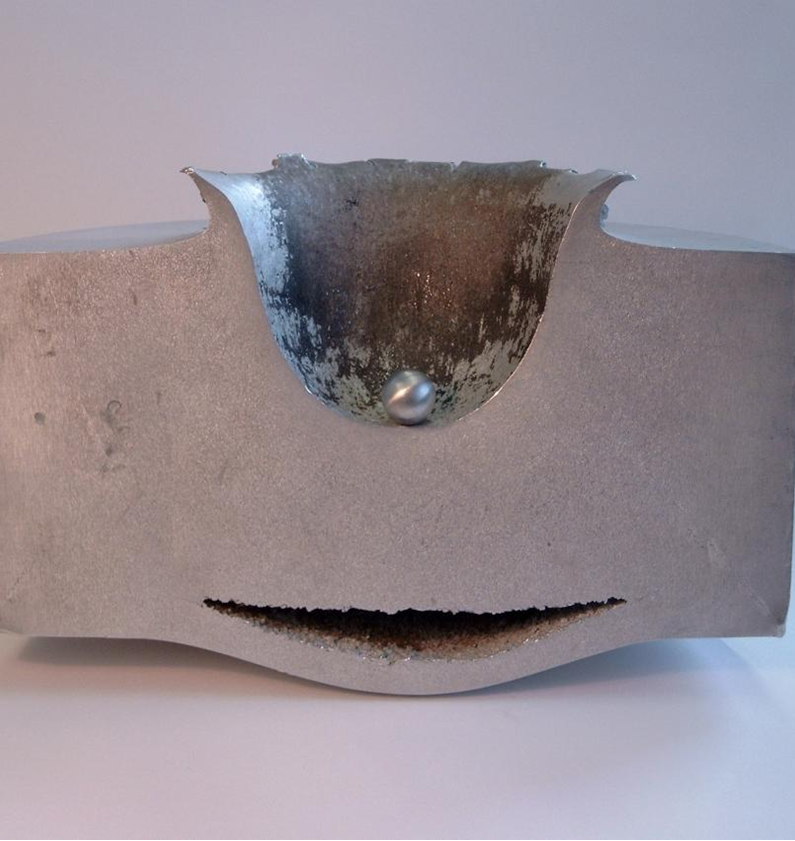
The aftermath of a hypervelocity impact, with a projectile the same size as the one that impacted for scale

Hypervelocity is very high velocity, approximately over 3,000 meters per second (11,000 km/h, 6,700 mph, 10,000 ft/s, or Mach 8.8). In particular, hypervelocity is velocity so high that the strength of materials upon impact is very small compared to inertial stresses. Thus, metals and fluids behave alike under hypervelocity impact. An impact under extreme hypervelocity results in vaporization of the impactor and target. For structural metals, hypervelocity is generally considered to be over 2,500 m/s (5,600 mph, 9,000 km/h, 8,200 ft/s, or Mach 7.3). Meteorite craters are also examples of hypervelocity impacts.

== Overview ==
The term "hypervelocity" refers to velocities in the range from a few kilometers per second to some tens of kilometers per second. This is especially relevant in the field of space exploration and military use of space, where hypervelocity impacts (e.g. by space debris or an attacking projectile) can result in anything from minor component degradation to the complete destruction of a spacecraft or missile. The impactor, as well as the surface it hits, can undergo temporary liquefaction. The impact process can generate plasma discharges, which can interfere with spacecraft electronics.

Hypervelocity usually occurs during meteor showers and deep space reentries, as carried out during the Zond, Apollo and Luna programs. Given the intrinsic unpredictability of the timing and trajectories of meteors, space capsules are prime data gathering opportunities for the study of thermal protection materials at hypervelocity (in this context, hypervelocity is defined as greater than escape velocity). Given the rarity of such observation opportunities since the 1970s, the Genesis and Stardust Sample Return Capsule (SRC) reentries as well as the recent Hayabusa SRC reentry have spawned observation campaigns, most notably at NASA's Ames Research Center.

Hypervelocity collisions can be studied by examining the results of naturally occurring collisions (between micrometeorites and spacecraft, or between meteorites and planetary bodies), or they may be performed in laboratories. Currently, the primary tool for laboratory experiments is a light-gas gun, but some experiments have used linear motors to accelerate projectiles to hypervelocity. The properties of metals under hypervelocity have been integrated with weapons, such as explosively formed penetrator. The vaporization upon impact and liquefaction of surfaces allow metal projectiles formed under hypervelocity forces to penetrate vehicle armor better than conventional bullets.

NASA studies the effects of simulated orbital debris at the White Sands Test Facility Remote Hypervelocity Test Laboratory (RHTL). Objects smaller than 10cm in diameter cannot be detected on radar. This has prompted spacecraft designers to develop shields to protect spacecraft from unavoidable collisions. At RHTL, micrometeoroid and orbital debris (MMOD) impacts are simulated on spacecraft components and shields allowing designers to test threats posed by the growing orbital debris environment and evolve shield technology to stay one step ahead. At RHTL, four two-stage light-gas guns propel 0.05 to 22.2 mm (0.0020 to 0.8740 in) diameter projectiles to velocities as fast as 8.5 km/s (5.3 mi/s).

== Hypervelocity reentry events ==
Date	Event	Speed (km/s)	Notes
8 September 2004	Genesis SRC	11.04	Crashed (drogue chute failure)
15 January 2006	Stardust SRC	12.79	Fastest man-made reentry on record (successful landing)
13 June 2010	Hayabusa SRC	12.2	Leading main Hayabusa spacecraft by 6,500 feet (2 000 m) (destructive reentry)

== Other definitions of hypervelocity ==
According to the United States Army, hypervelocity can also refer to the muzzle velocity of a weapon system, with the exact definition dependent upon the weapon in question. When discussing small arms a muzzle velocity of 5,000 ft/s (1524 m/s) or greater is considered hypervelocity, while for tank cannons the muzzle velocity must meet or exceed 3,350 ft/s (1021.08 m/s) to be considered hypervelocity, and the threshold for artillery cannons is 3,500 ft/s (1066.8 m/s).

== See also ==
- 2009 satellite collision
- Hypersonic aircraft
- Hypersonic flight
- Hypersonic
- Hypervelocity star
- Impact depth#Newton's approximation for the impact depth
- Kinetic energy penetrator
- Terminal velocity
