= 2009 satellite collision =

First hypervelocity spacecraft collision

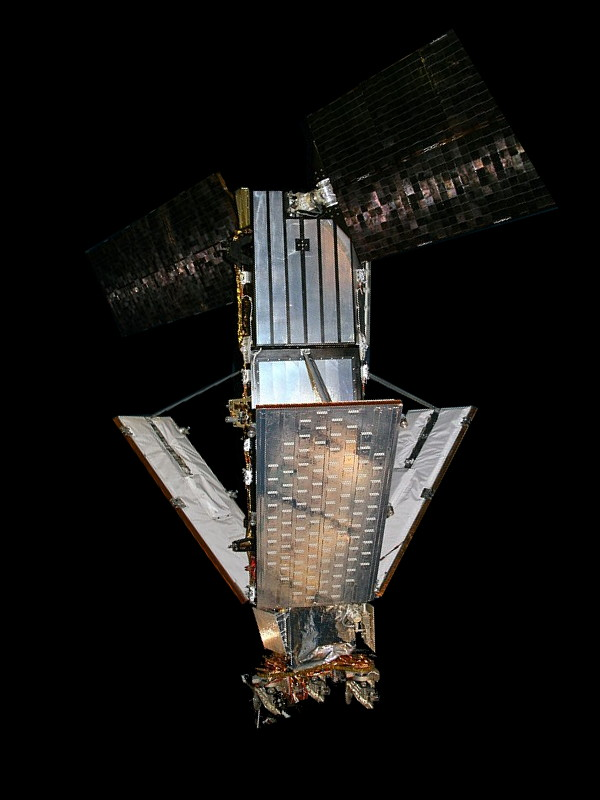
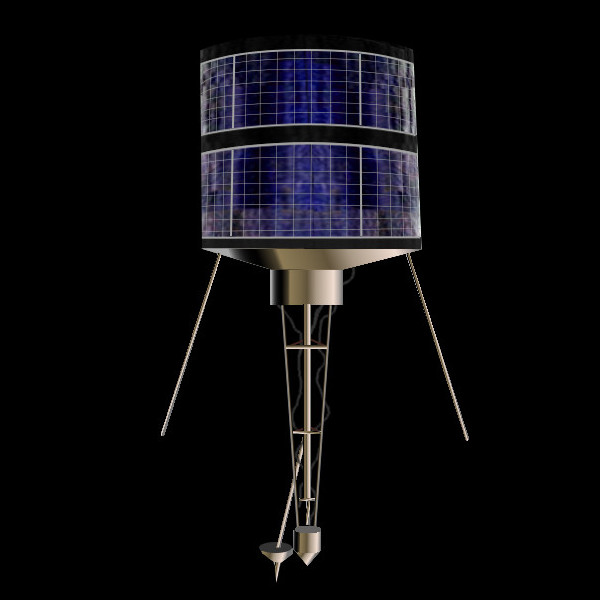
The two satellites involved in the collision: Iridium 33 (silver and gold) and a digital rendering of Kosmos 2251 (blue cylinder)

On February 10, 2009, two communications satellites—the active commercial Iridium 33 and the derelict Russian military Kosmos 2251—accidentally collided at a speed of 11.7 km/s (26,000 mph) and an altitude of 789 kilometres (490 mi) above the Taymyr Peninsula in Siberia. It was the first time a hypervelocity collision had occurred between two satellites; previous incidents had involved a satellite and a piece of space debris.

== Spacecraft ==
Kosmos 2251 was a 950-kilogram (2,100 lb) Russian Strela military communications satellite owned by the Russian Space Forces. Kosmos 2251 was launched on a Russian Cosmos-3M carrier rocket on June 16, 1993. This satellite had been deactivated prior to the collision, and remained in orbit as space debris.

The other spacecraft, Iridium 33, was a 560-kilogram (1,200 lb) U.S.-built commercial satellite that was part of the Iridium constellation for satellite phones. It was launched on September 14, 1997, atop a Russian Proton rocket.

== Conjunction and collision ==
Events where two satellites approach within several kilometers of each other occur numerous times each day. Sorting through the large number of potential collisions to identify those that are high risk presents a challenge. Precise, up-to-date information regarding current satellite positions is difficult to obtain. Calculations made by CelesTrak had expected these two satellites to miss by 584 m (1,916 ft).

Planning an avoidance maneuver with due consideration of the risk, the fuel consumption required for the maneuver, and its effects on the satellite's normal functioning can also be challenging. John Campbell of Iridium spoke at a June 2007 forum discussing these tradeoffs and the difficulty of handling all the notifications they were getting regarding close approaches, which numbered 400 per week (for approaches within 5 km (3 mi)) for the entire Iridium constellation. He estimated the risk of collision per conjunction as one in 50 million.

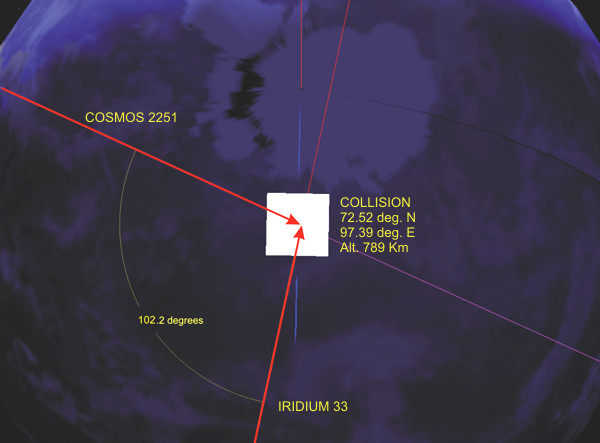
Collision diagram

The collision occurred at 16:56 UTC and destroyed both the Iridium 33 and Kosmos-2251. The Iridium satellite was operational at the time of the collision. Kosmos-2251 had gone out of service in 1995. It had no propulsion system, and was no longer actively controlled.

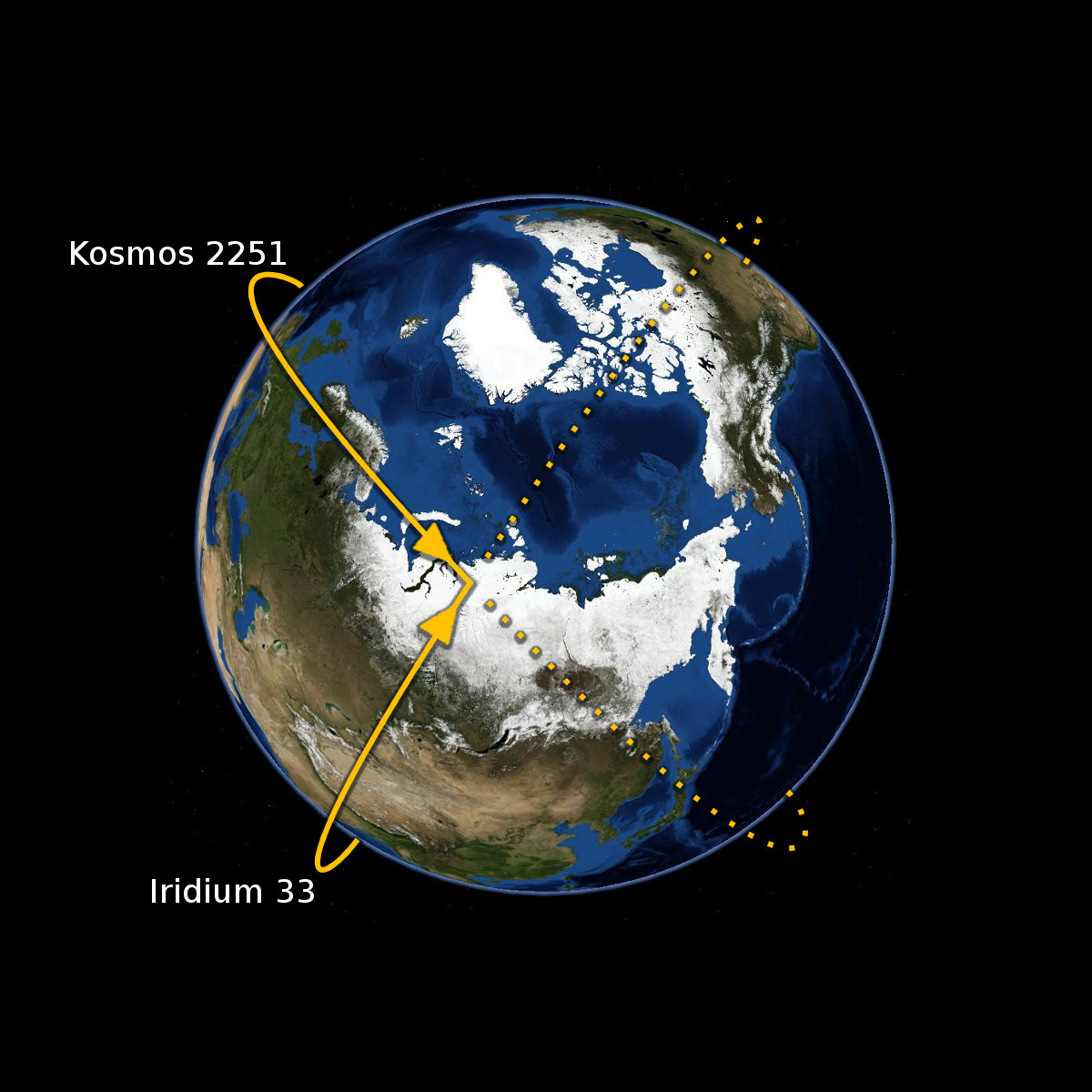
Point of collision

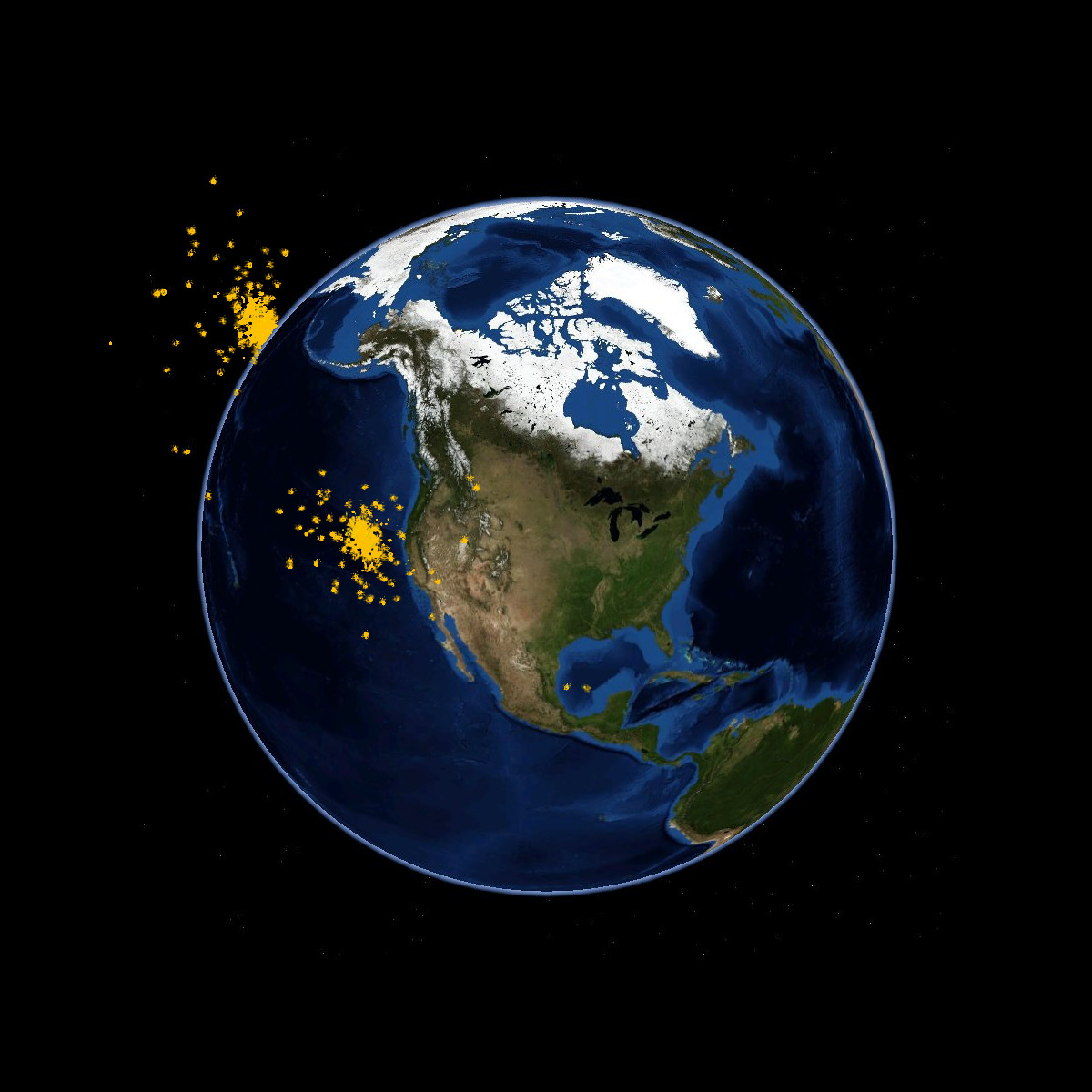
Debris fields after 20 minutes

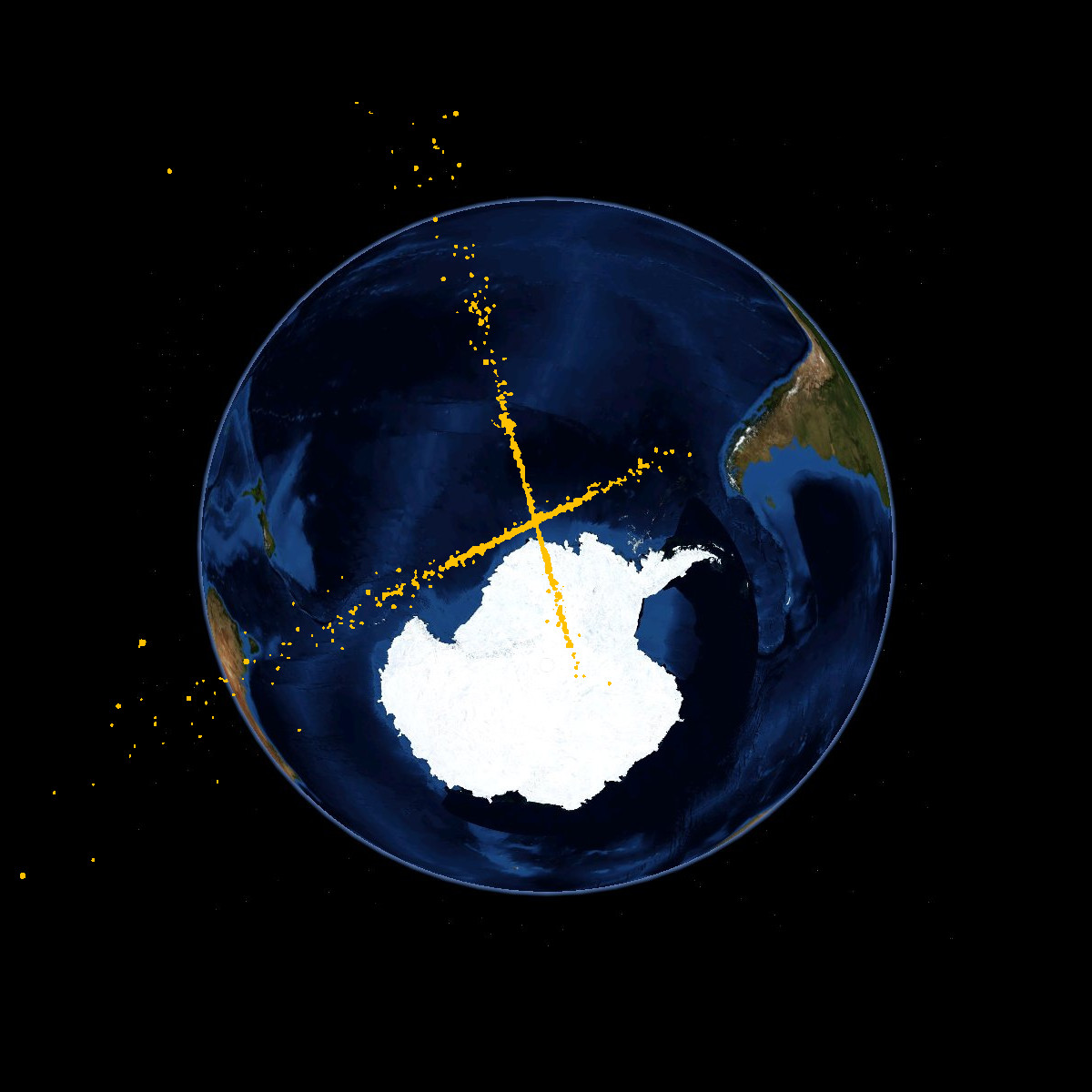
Debris fields after 50 minutes

== Fallout ==
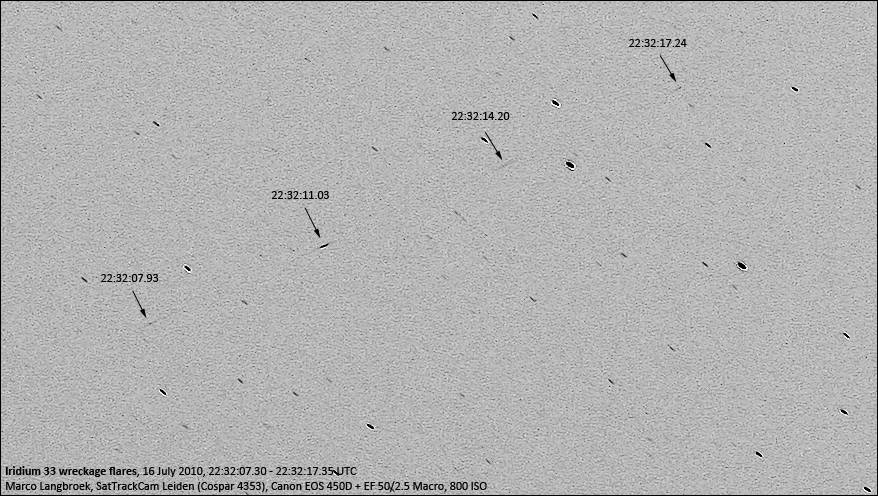
Flashes created by the tumbling main body of the Iridium 33 wreckage

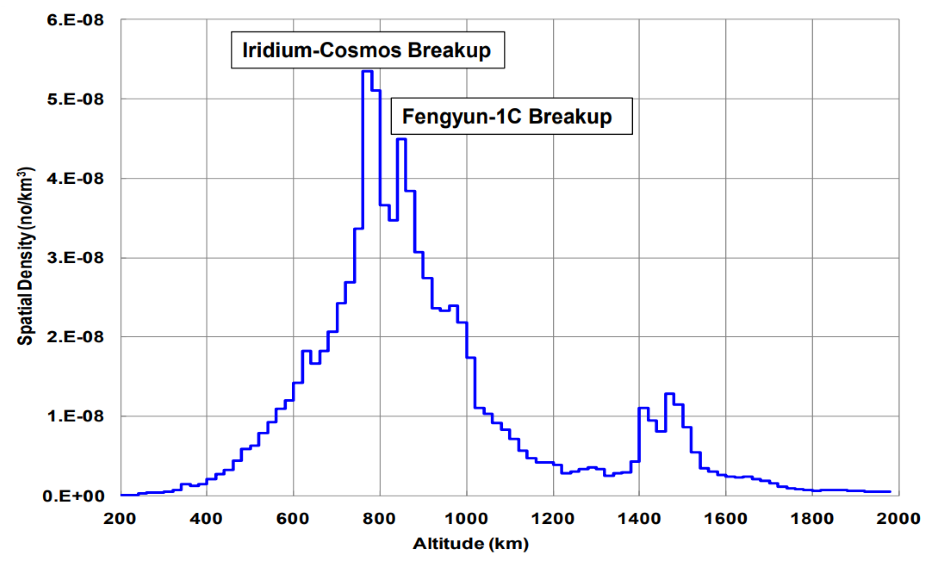
The collision resulted in significant debris in low Earth orbit. (2011)

NASA initially estimated ten days after the collision that the satellite space incident had created at least 1,000 pieces of debris larger than 10 cm (4 in), in addition to many smaller ones. By July 2011, the U.S. Space Surveillance Network had catalogued over 2000 large debris fragments from the collision. NASA determined the risk to the International Space Station, which orbits about 430 kilometres (270 mi) below the collision course, to be low, as was any threat to the shuttle launch (STS-119) then planned for late February 2009. However, Chinese scientists have said that the debris does pose a threat to Chinese satellites in Sun-synchronous orbits, and the ISS did have to perform an avoidance maneuver due to collision debris in March 2011.

By December 2011, many smaller pieces of the debris were in an observable orbital decay towards Earth, and were expected to burn up in the atmosphere within one to two years. In 2016, Space News listed the collision as the second-biggest fragmentation event in history, with Kosmos-2251 and Iridium 33 producing, respectively, 1,668 and 628 pieces of catalogued debris, of which 1,141 and 364 pieces of tracked debris remained in orbit as of January 2016. In 2024, 15 years after the collision, the U.S. Space Surveillance Catalog listed 916 and 212 pieces of debris still in orbit, respectively.

A small piece of Kosmos-2251 satellite debris safely passed by the International Space Station at 2:38 a.m. EDT, Saturday, March 24, 2012, at a distance of approximately 120 m (390 ft). As a precaution, ISS management had the six crew members on board the orbiting complex take refuge inside the two docked Soyuz rendezvous spacecraft until the debris had passed.

A number of reports of phenomena in the U.S. states of Texas, Kentucky, and New Mexico were attributed to debris from the collision in the days immediately following the first reports of the incident in 2009, although NASA and the United States Strategic Command, which tracks satellites and orbital debris, did not announce any reentries of debris at the time and reported that these phenomena were unrelated to the collision. On February 13, 2009, witnesses in Kentucky heard sonic booms. The National Weather Service issued an information statement alerting residents of sonic booms due to the falling satellite debris. The Federal Aviation Administration also released a notice warning to pilots of the re-entering debris. Some reports include details that point to these phenomena being caused by a meteoroid shower. A very bright meteor over Texas on February 15, 2009, was mistaken for reentering debris by some witnesses.

This collision and numerous near-misses have renewed calls for mandatory disposal of defunct satellites (typically by deorbiting them, or at minimum, sending them to a graveyard orbit), but no such international law exists as of 2026. Nevertheless, some countries have adopted such a law domestically, such as France in December 2010. The United States Federal Communications Commission (FCC) requires all geostationary satellites launched after March 18, 2002 to commit to moving to a graveyard orbit at the end of their operational life.

== See also ==
- 2007 Chinese anti-satellite missile test – another large space debris creation event
- ASM-135 ASAT – first-known anti-satellite weapon test
- Kessler syndrome (ablation cascade) – a positive feedback loop where space debris creates more debris until all orbits are prohibited
- Laser broom – a proposed method of getting rid of space debris
- Operation Burnt Frost
- Project West Ford – largest recorded space debris creation event
- Space Liability Convention
