= Kosmos 2251 =

Defunct Russian military communications satellite, operational from 1993 to 1995

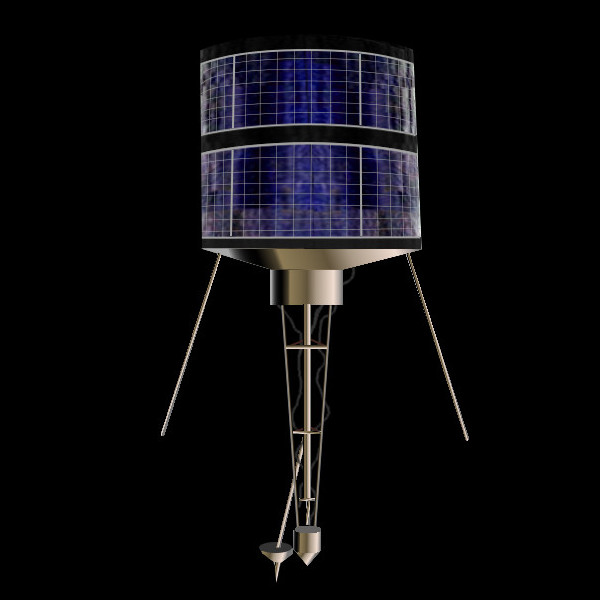
- A Strela-2M communication satellite, similar to Kosmos 2251.
- Mission type: Military communication
- Operator: VKS
- COSPAR ID: 1993-036A
- SATCAT no.: 22675
- Mission duration: 5 years (nominal mission)

Spacecraft properties
- Spacecraft type: Strela-2M
- Bus: KAUR-1
- Manufacturer: Reshetnev
- Launch mass: 900 kg

Start of mission
- Launch date: 16 June 1993, 04:17 UTC
- Rocket: Kosmos-3M
- Launch site: Plesetsk, Site 132/1

End of mission
- Destroyed: 10 February 2009, 16:56 UTC
- Last contact: 1995

Orbital parameters
- Reference system: Geocentric
- Regime: Low Earth
- Perigee altitude: 783 km
- Apogee altitude: 821 km
- Inclination: 74.0°
- Period: 101.0 minutes

Kosmos-2251 (Russian: Космос-2251 meaning Cosmos 2251) was a Russian Strela-2M military communications satellite. It was launched into Low Earth orbit from Site 132/1 at the Plesetsk Cosmodrome at 04:17 UTC on 16 June 1993, by a Kosmos-3M carrier rocket. The Strela satellites had a lifespan of 5 years, and the Russian government reported that Kosmos-2251 ceased functioning in 1995. Russia was later criticised by The Space Review for leaving a defunct satellite in a congested orbit, rather than deorbiting it. In response, Russia noted that they were (and are) not required to do so under international law. In any case, the KAUR-1 satellites had no propulsion system, which is usually required for deorbiting.

== Destruction ==
At 16:56 UTC on 10 February 2009, it collided with Iridium 33 (1997-051C), an Iridium satellite, in the first major collision of two satellites in Earth orbit. The Iridium satellite, which was operational at the time of the collision, was destroyed, as was Kosmos-2251. NASA reported that a large amount of debris was produced by the collision.

== See also ==
- Kessler syndrome
