= In-orbit fragmentation =

Event causing release of space debris

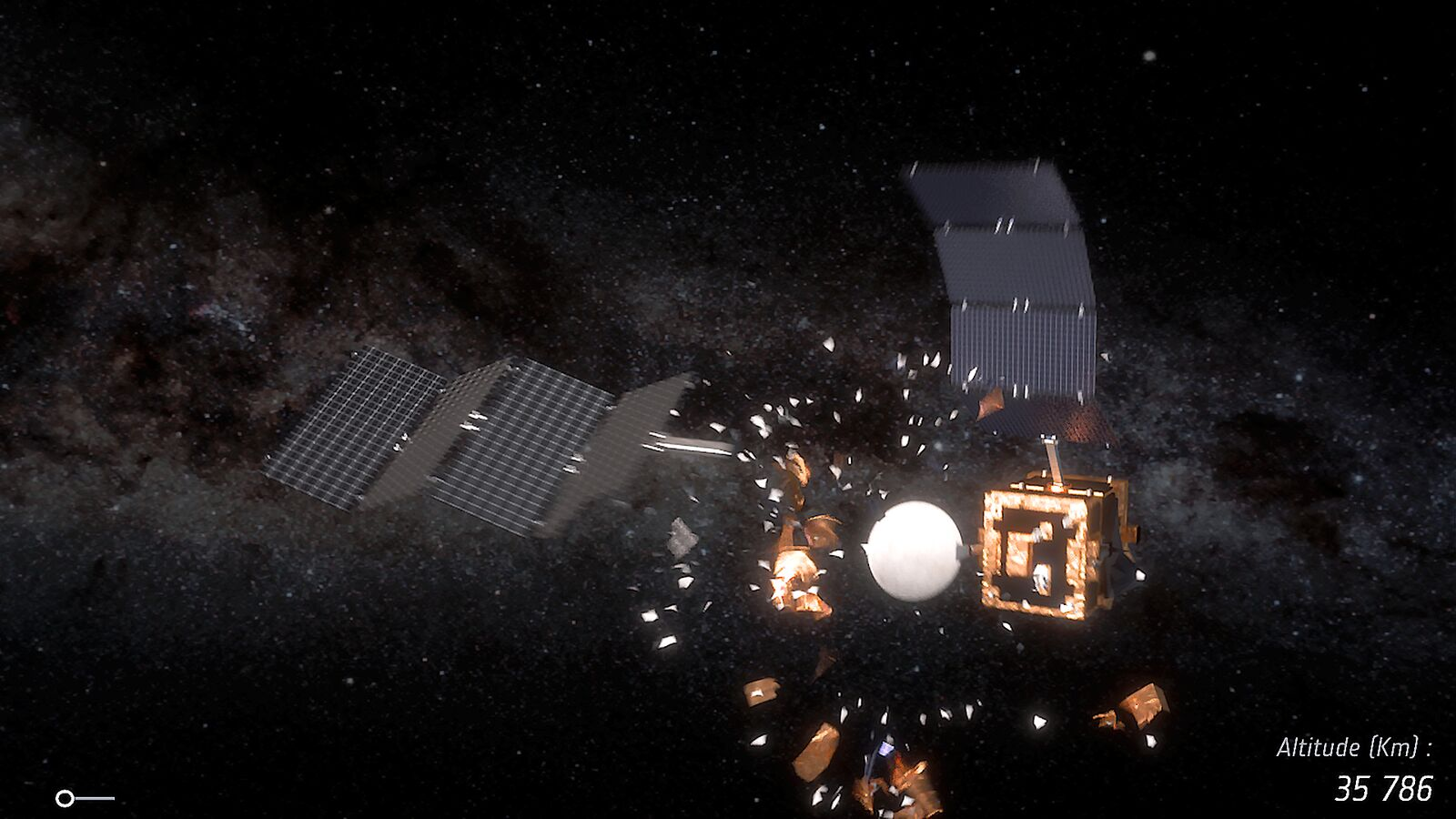
Artistic impression of a satellite collision. Credits: ESA

An in-orbit fragmentation (also known as an on-orbit fragmentation) is an event in which an orbiting human-made object releases one or more fragments (space debris) into the space environment without that release being part of its intended mission. Fragmentation events may result from accidental or intentional collisions, explosions caused by residual propellants or pressurized systems, structural failures, or other physical break-ups.

According to NASA, in-orbit fragmentation events have generated approximately half of all tracked artificial objects in Earth orbit. The objects produced by these events contribute significantly to the orbital debris population. As a result, fragmentation debris represents one of the principal challenges for space traffic management, which seeks to ensure the safe and sustainable operation of spacecraft through activities such as space object tracking, conjunction assessment, and collision avoidance. As the debris environment becomes more congested, successive collisions may generate additional fragments in a self-sustaining process known as the Kessler syndrome.

As Earth orbit is a finite resource, limiting the generation of space debris through the prevention of in-orbit fragmentations is a key objective of international space debris mitigation efforts. This objective is reflected in the United Nations Committee on the Peaceful Uses of Outer Space's guidelines for the long-term sustainability of outer space activities and other international debris mitigation guidelines.

== History ==
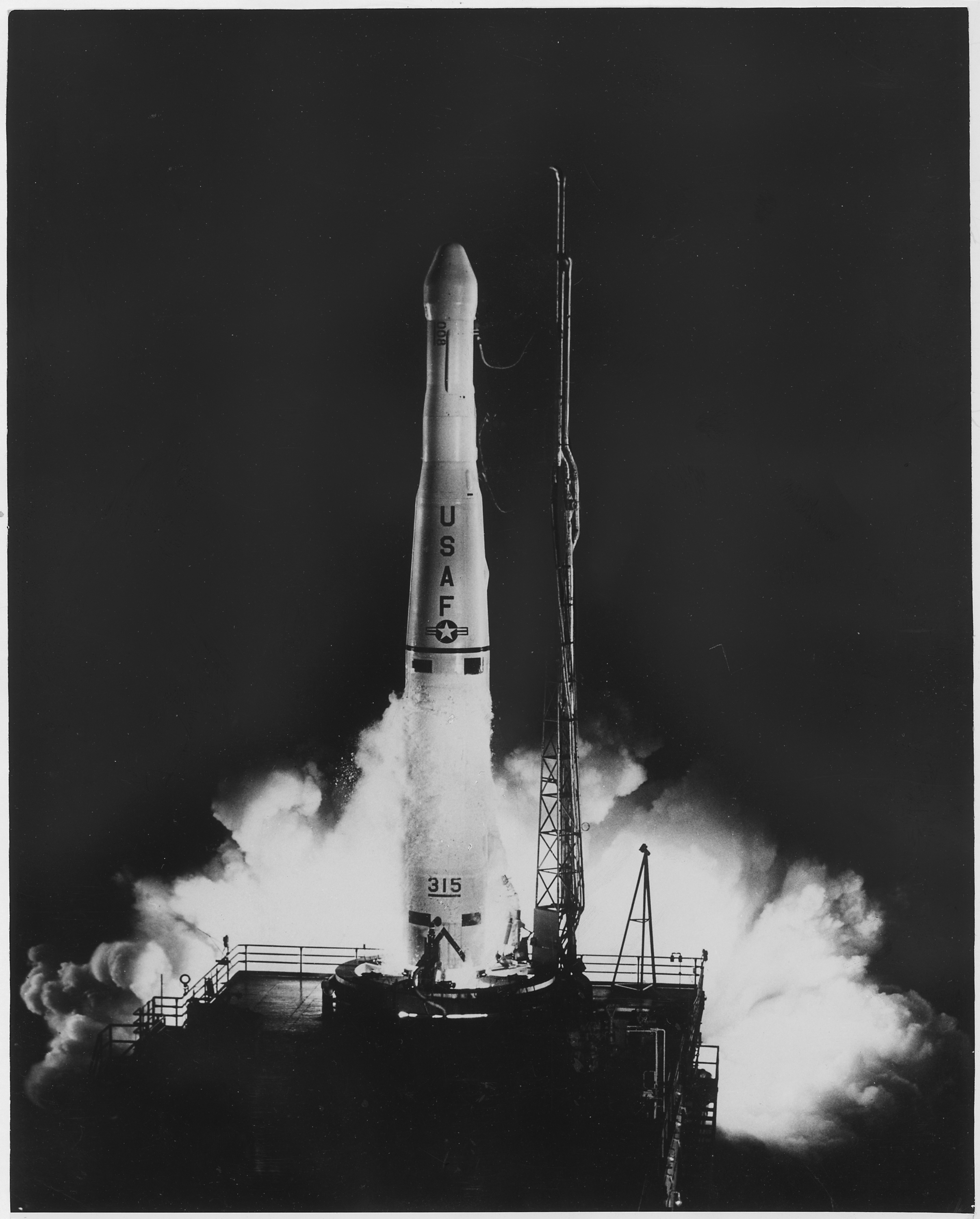
Thor-Ablestar launcher in 1961.

The first in-orbit fragmentation was registered at 06:08:10 UTC on June 29, 1961, when the upper stage of a Thor-Ablestar rocket exploded after deploying the US Transit-4A satellite. This event generated 294 trackable fragments, an amount that more than tripled the number of known objects at the time. Even 30 years after the break-up, around 200 pieces were still in orbit.

=== Known fragmentation events ===
Since the first fragmentation until the end of 2025, there had been 661 confirmed break-up events, 207 being registered in the last 20 years. The following are the 10 largest in-orbit fragmentations recorded since the beginning of the space age, according to the ESA's fragmentation database.

10 largest in-orbit fragmentation events (as of July 2026)
| Name | Operator / State | Event date | Catalogued objects | Objects still catalogued | Event type |
|---|---|---|---|---|---|
| Fengyun-1C | China | 11 Jan 2007 | 3521 | 2854 | Deliberate collision (ASAT) |
| Cosmos-2251/Iridium 33 | Russia/ United States | 10 Feb 2009 | 2368 | 1330 | Accidental collision |
| Cosmos-1408 | Russia | 15 Nov 2021 | 1793 | 82 | Deliberate collision (ASAT) |
| Centaur-5 SEC (Atlas V 551) | United States | 06 Apr 2019 | 1214 | 1213 | Explosion (propulsion system) |
| Intelsat 33e (IS-33e) | United States | 19 Oct 2024 | 1103 | 1103 | Explosion (propulsion system) |
| L-15 (YF-115) (Long March (CZ) 6A) | China | 12 Nov 2022 | 790 | 702 | Explosion (propulsion system) |
| HAPS (Pegasus/HAPS) | United States | 03 Jun 1996 | 753 | 81 | Explosion (propulsion system) |
| L-15 (YF-115) (Long March (CZ) 6A) | China | 06 Aug 2024 | 705 | 587 | Explosion (propulsion system) |
| Centaur-5 SEC (Atlas V 401) | United States | 30 Aug 2018 | 620 | 620 | Explosion (propulsion system) |
| Cosmos-2421 fragmentation debris | Russia | 14 Mar 2008 | 509 | 1 | Unknown |

== Types of fragmentation ==
In-orbit fragmentations are commonly classified according to the physical mechanism responsible for the release of debris. The principal categories are collisions, explosions, structural failures, and anomalous releases, although some events remain unconfirmed or cannot be attributed to a specific cause due to limited observational evidence.

=== Collisions ===
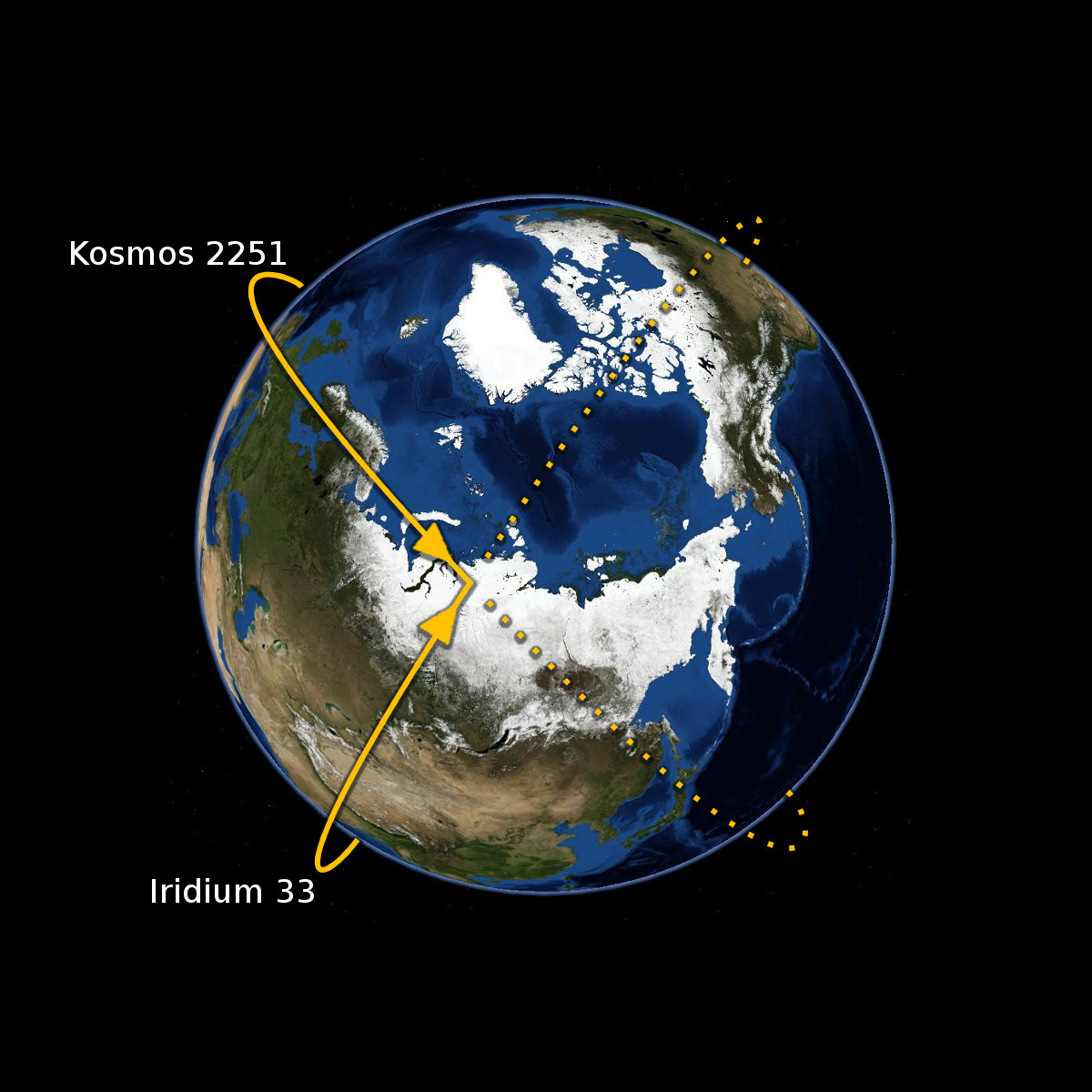
Point of collision between Cosmos 2251 and Iridium 33 on February 10, 2009

Collisions occur when two orbiting objects impact each other, either accidentally or intentionally. This includes both collisions involving operational spacecraft and debris, as well as deliberate destruction events such as anti-satellite (ASAT) tests. High-energy collisions are typically associated with the largest debris production and can generate thousands of trackable fragments in a single event. A well-known example is the 2009 collision between Iridium 33 and Cosmos 2251. To prevent these types of events, satellite operators use collision avoidance manoeuvres, based on conjunction assessments and tracking data provided by space surveillance networks, to reduce the probability of impact with catalogued objects.

=== Explosions ===
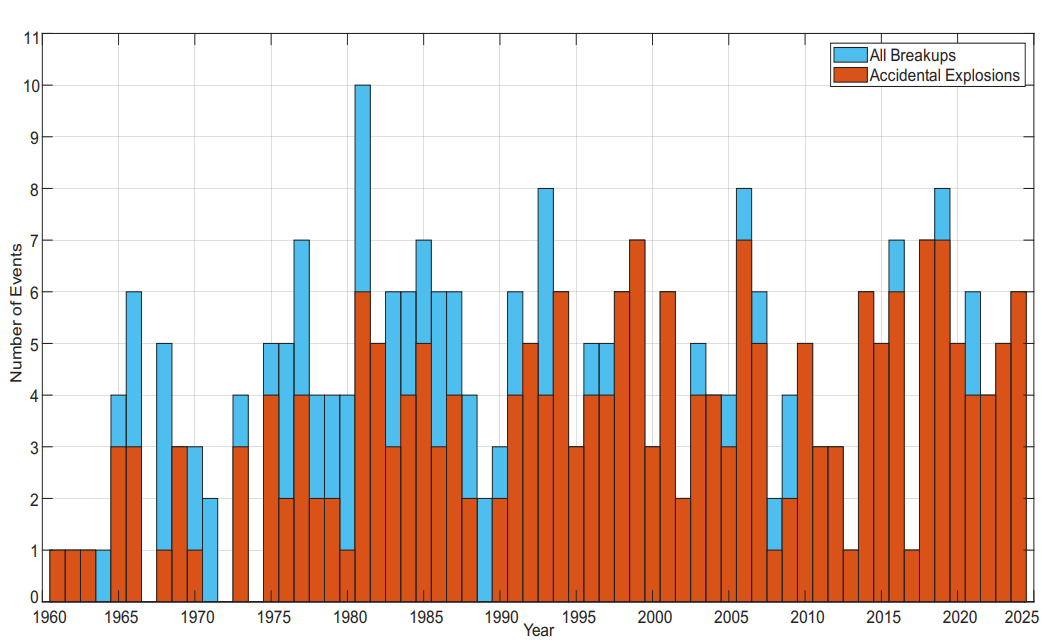
Historical number of yearly breakups for all breakup events and accidental explosions only. Credit: NASA ODPO

Explosions are fragmentations resulting from the sudden release of stored energy within a spacecraft or launch vehicle stage. Typical sources include residual propellants, pressurized tanks, batteries, and propulsion systems. Regarding the latter, over time, heating, material degradation, or internal pressure buildup can lead to tank rupture or combustion of trapped propellants. Historically, explosion events were among the most frequent causes of fragmentation, motivating the adoption of passivation measures to eliminate stored energy sources at end of mission. A notable example is the fragmentation of the Intelsat 33e, which is considered one of the largest GEO fragmentation events recorded.

=== Structural failures and anomalous releases ===
Other types of fragmentation causes include mechanical failure, material degradation, aerodynamic break-up during orbital decay, or the unplanned shedding of components while the parent object remains largely intact. These events are often of lower energetic magnitude than explosions or collisions but can still produce catalogued debris. An example is the fragmentation of the Hitomi (ASTRO-H), which suffered a critical attitude control failure leading to structural breakup and subsequent debris generation.

=== Unknown or unconfirmed ===
A fraction of fragmentation events remains classified as unknown or unconfirmed, reflecting insufficient observational evidence to determine the underlying cause. These cases may be reclassified as additional tracking data or forensic reconstruction becomes available. Such cases often arise when only a limited number of fragments are detected without direct telemetry or confirmed impact signatures. An example is the breakup of the Cosmos 1275 in 1981, which has been classified in debris catalogues as an anomalous fragmentation event with an uncertain cause.

=== Distinction by severity ===
Fragmentation events are also commonly distinguished by severity. For example, in the NASA Standard Breakup Model, a catastrophic fragmentation completely disrupts the parent object, whereas a non-catastrophic fragmentation leaves the main body largely intact while releasing debris. This distinction is widely used in debris environment modeling and risk assessment.

For collisions, catastrophic fragmentations are often associated with a specific impact energy $Q$ exceeding a threshold:

$Q = \frac{1}{2} \frac{m_p m_t}{m_p + m_t} v_{\text{rel}}^2$

where $m_p$ and $m_t$ are the masses of the projectile and target, and $v_{\text{rel}}$ is the relative velocity. When $Q$ exceeds a critical value ($Q^*\approx 40\ \mathrm{J/kg}$), a complete or near-complete break-up occurs. In non-catastrophic events, the target object remains largely intact while still releasing a measurable debris population.

== Dynamics of fragments ==
After a fragmentation event, the resulting debris are initially distributed along trajectories similar to that of the parent object, with small velocity increments imparted during the breakup process. This leads to the formation of a debris cloud that is initially concentrated near the original orbit, before being progressively shaped by orbital perturbations.

=== LEO ===
In low Earth orbit (LEO), the long-term evolution of fragments is dominated by atmospheric drag, Earth’s oblateness (J2 perturbation), and solar activity. Atmospheric drag causes progressive orbital decay, with decay rates strongly dependent on area-to-mass ratio and altitude, while J2-driven secular effects induce differential precession of orbital planes, leading to longitudinal dispersion of the debris cloud. Solar activity variations further modulate atmospheric density, introducing significant variability in orbital lifetimes.

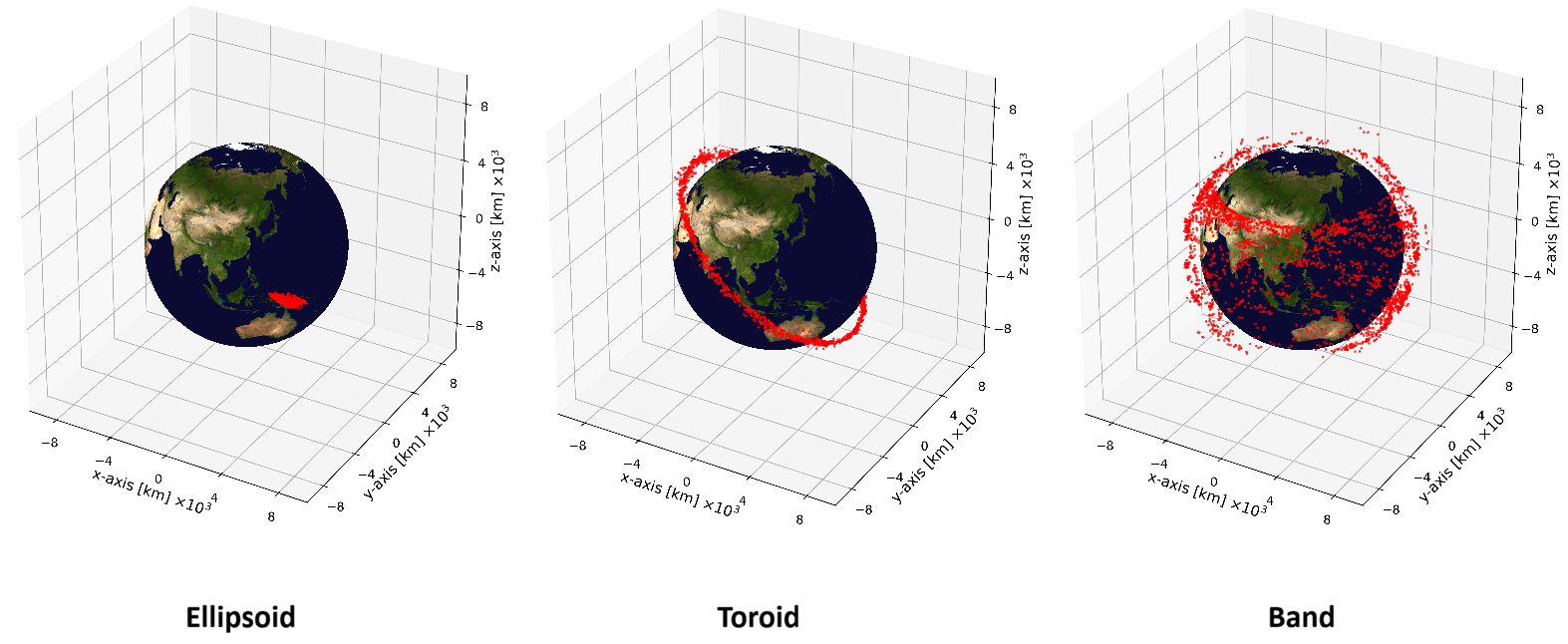
Debris cloud evolution stages in LEO

The initial stage of the debris after fragmentation is a compact three-dimensional cloud, often approximated as an ellipsoid centred on the fragmentation point. As fragments with different orbital energies complete revolutions at different rates, within days, the cloud is progressively stretched along the parent orbit, eventually forming a toroid around the Earth. Subsequently, differential precession caused primarily by the J2 perturbation randomizes the argument of periapsis $\omega$ and the longitude of the ascending node $\Omega$, transforming the toroid into a nearly continuous band of debris encircling the Earth. This orbital randomization typically occurs over several months, after which atmospheric drag becomes the dominant driver of the long-term evolution of the debris cloud.

=== GEO ===
In geostationary orbit (GEO), the absence of atmospheric drag allows fragments to remain in orbit for very long timescales. Their evolution is instead governed primarily by Earth's non-spherical gravitational field, luni-solar gravitational perturbations, and solar radiation pressure.

The Earth's geopotential creates two stable equilibrium regions, or geopotential wells, located near 75°E and 105°W longitude. Fragments or inactive satellites with sufficiently small longitudinal drift may become trapped within these regions, where they undergo long-period oscillations lasting several years. Luni-solar perturbations also induce long-term oscillations in orbital inclination, with debris experiencing inclination growth of up to approximately 15° over a period of about 26 years before returning toward the equatorial plane.

== See also ==
- Satellite collision avoidance
- Satellite collision
- Space debris
- Space sustainability
- Kessler syndrome
