= Space debris model =

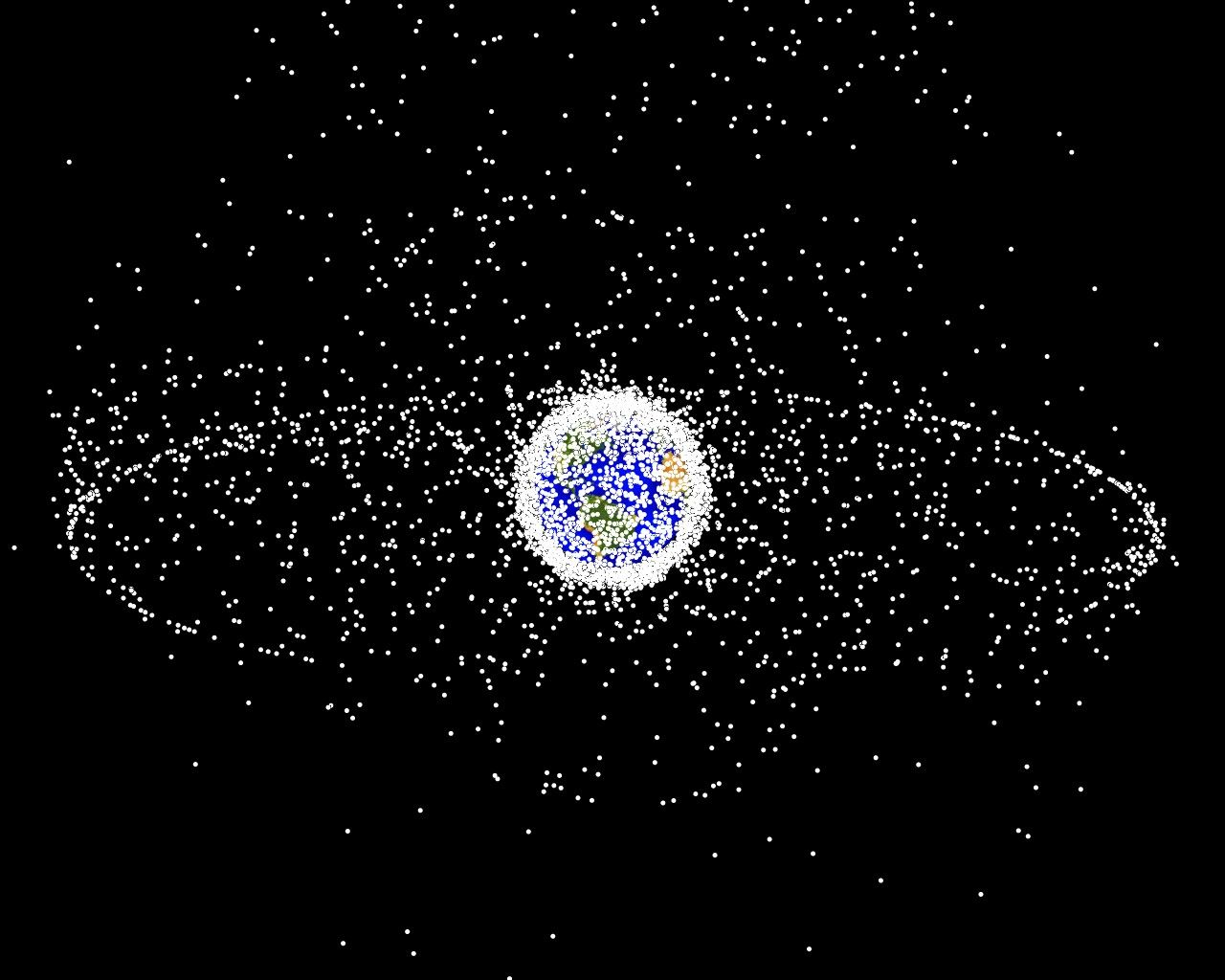
Illustration depicting the space debris in low Earth orbit.

A space debris model is a representation of the space environment that focuses on accurately replicating the generation and depletion of the in-orbit space debris population and its relationship with existing spacecraft, in order to provide short- and long-term forecasts analyses. In this latter case, it is a core tool for space sustainability, used to assess the impact of past and current practices in the space economy through the development of sensitivity studies by the main space agencies (such as ASI, CNES, DLR, ESA, JAXA and NASA).

== History ==
=== The problem of the space debris ===
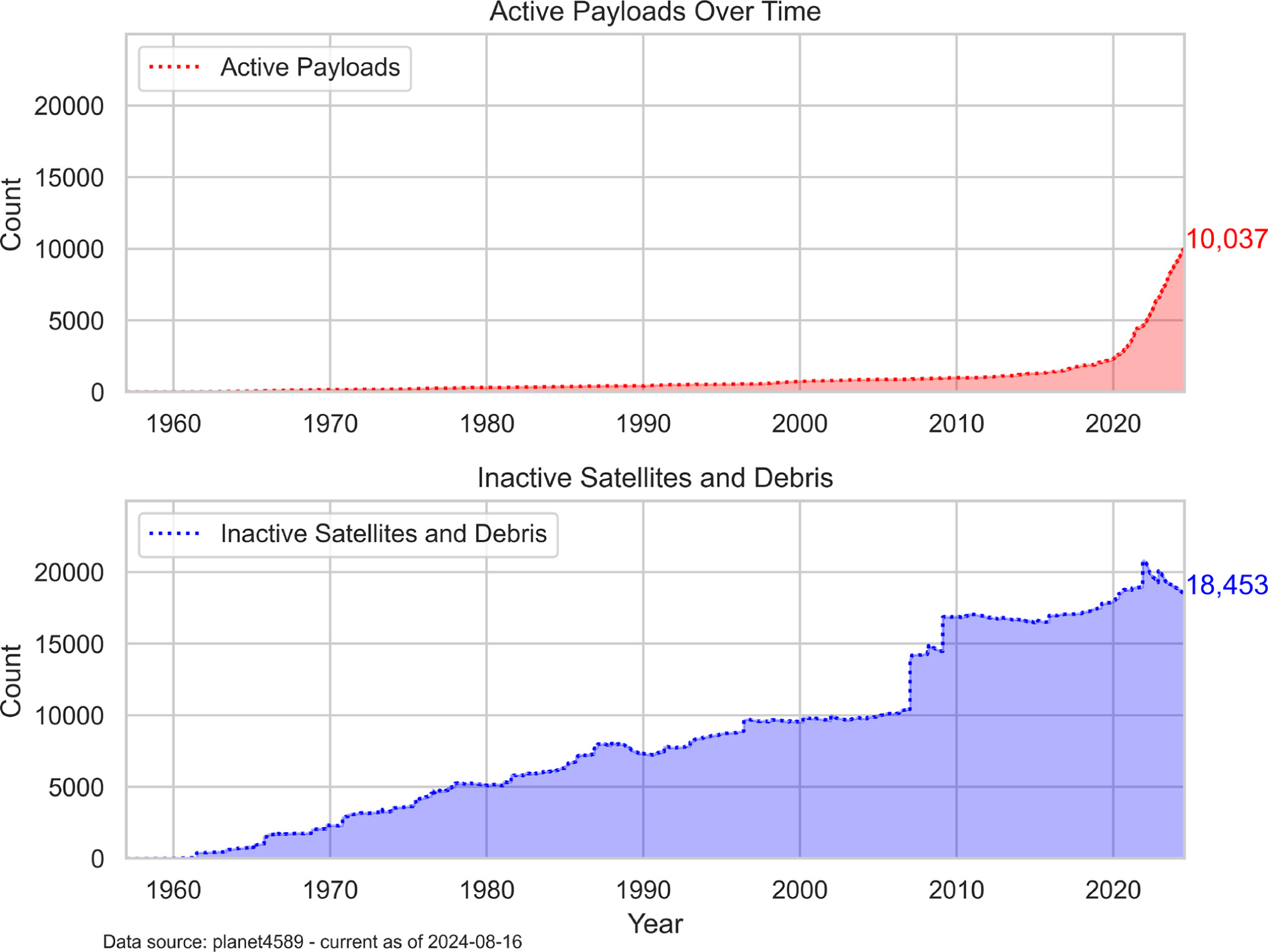
Evolution of the number of active and inactive payload and debris in orbit from 1957 to 2024.

The number of human-originated objects in space has grown significantly and persistently since the beginning of the space era. Besides the actual payload (the spacecraft intended to serve scientific, commercial, governmental or military purposes), several other objects used during the deployment phase are produced and left in orbit: these include rocket bodies, leaked fluids and other elements generally referred to as mission-related objects.

In addition to these elements, internal failures have led to several instances of satellite explosions that resulted in the production of space debris fragments (a fragmentation event). Together with other uncontrollable and uncontrolled objects (made by mission-related objects, rocket bodies and spacecraft that have reached the end of their operative lives), these events have contributed to creating a population of different sized objects that can exhibit significant orbital lifetimes due to the very low effect of atmospheric drag at high altitudes.

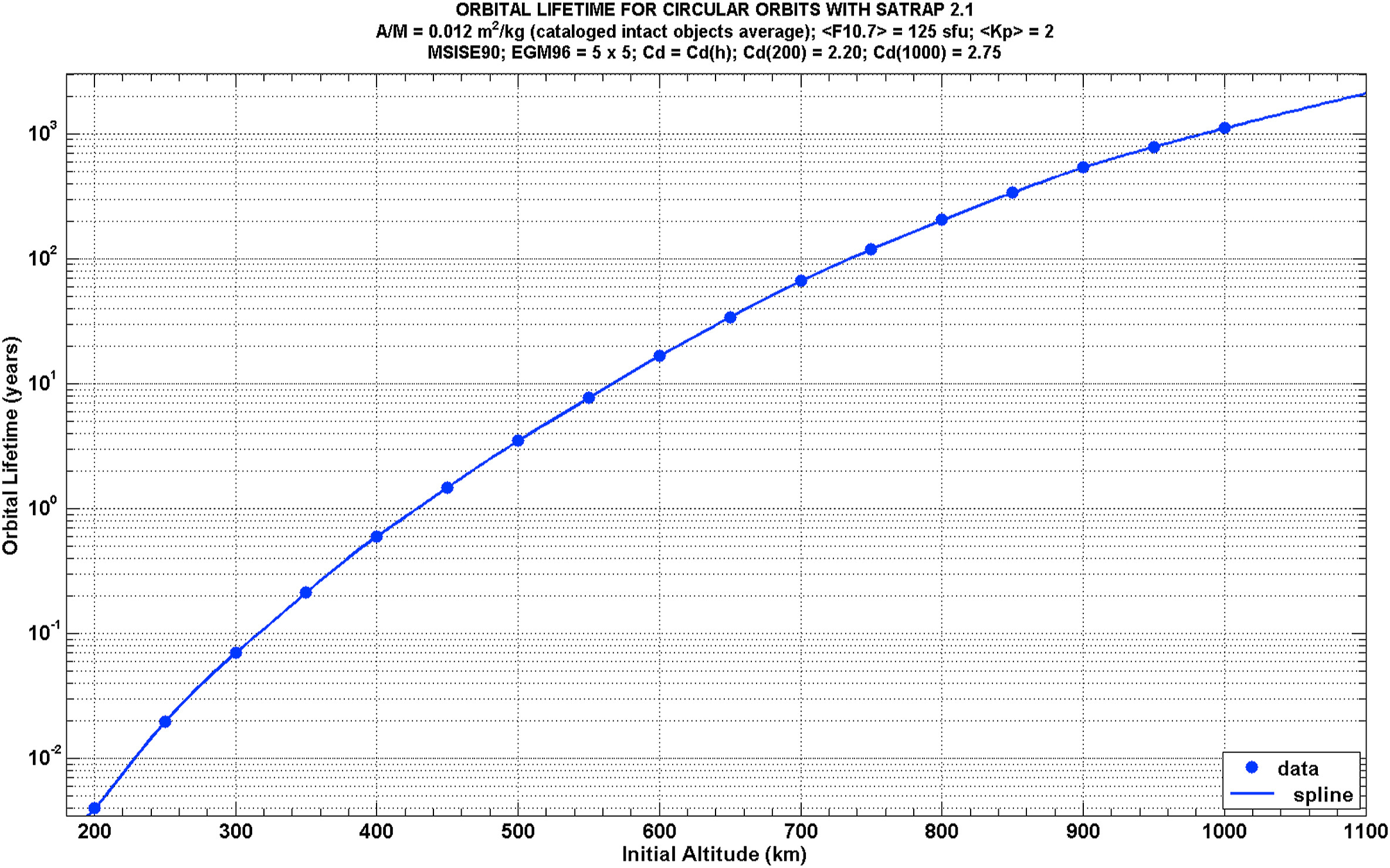
Orbital lifetime for circular objects. At 800 km the objects stay in orbit for over 100 years.

The problem of space debris has been recognised since the early years of the development of the human spaceflight programs; however, given the limited detection capabilities of small particles in space, the issue required multiple strategies:

- on one hand, the actual improvement of detection capabilities, both in terms of detectable size and timing in case of possible conjunction events. This strategy is linked with advances in collision avoidance solutions such as the development of just-in-time collision avoidance (JCA);
- on the other hand, the development of numerical simulations that can provide a forecast of the evolution of the space population, to study the short-term effects (e.g., to characterise the evolution of a fragmentation event to possibly develop collision avoidance schemes) or the long-term effects (e.g., to estimate the possible number of collision events and the size of the population on the long-term).

=== Modelling developments ===
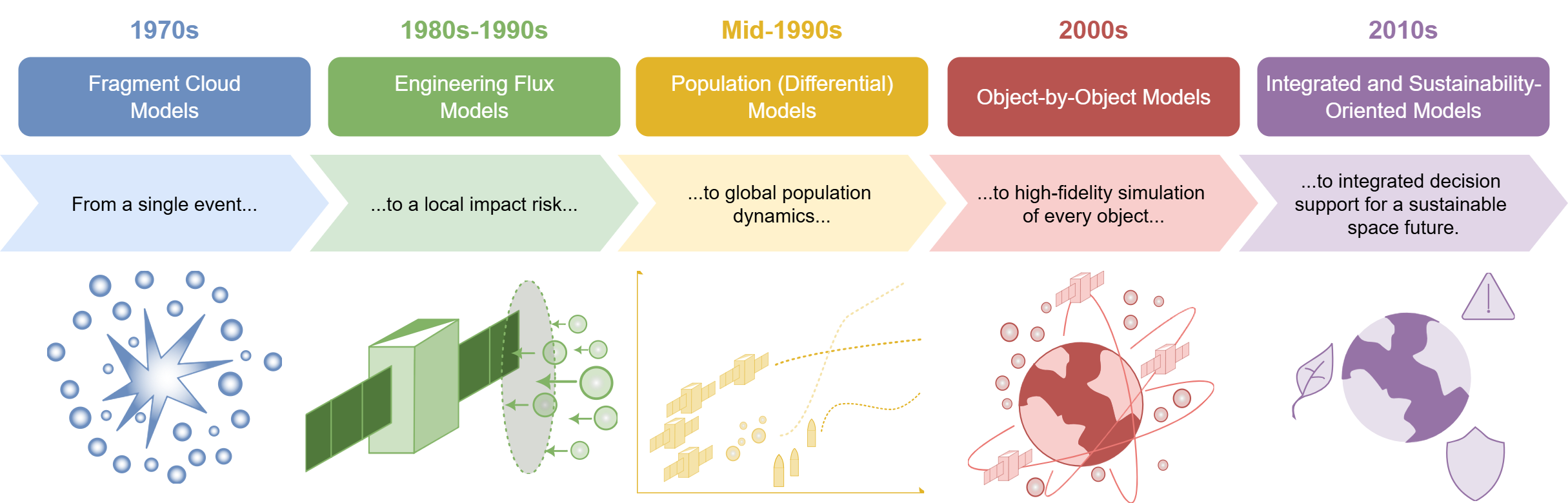
Evolution in time of the purposes of a debris model

Space debris models
| 1986 | MASTER |
1987
1988
1989
| 1990 | Talent's |
| 1991 | Farinella and Cordelli's, EVOLVE |
1992
1993
| 1994 | STAT |
| 1995 | SDM |
| 1996 | ORDEM96 |
1997
| 1998 | LUCA |
1999
| 2000 | SDPA |
| 2001 | SDPA-E, Kessler, DELTA, DAMAGE |
2002
| 2003 | LEGEND |
2004
2005
| 2006 | SIMPLE |
2007
2008
| 2009 | FADE, NEODEM, ADEPT |
2010
2011
| 2012 | MEDEE |
2013
| 2014 | CASCADE |
| 2015 | SDEEM |
2016
2017
2018
| 2019 | MASTER-8, SOLEM |
2020
2021
2022
| 2023 | MOCAT-MC |
| 2024 | MOCAT-SSEM, NESSY |

Initial studies beginning from 1976 on the phenomena of space debris focused on describing the evolution of an orbiting debris cloud following a debris generation event. These early models are generally short-term only and assume that perturbations can largely be neglected, hence they are based on analytical equations that describe the cloud volume time variation.

Following the explosion of an upper stage of Ariane in 1986, the European Space Agency started the development of MASTER (meteoroid and space debris terrestrial environment reference), a flux-based model used to estimate the flux of particles for a satellite mission. The model, used on IADC level, reached version 8 (MASTER-8) in March 2019.

In the same period, NASA initiated the ORDEM programme, initially based on analytical solutions and later converted to computer-based version in 1996 with ORDEM96. Further progress and modelling features were introduced with ORDEM 3.0 and ORDEM 4.0 respectively.

In parallel with the development of more complex models, which are too computationally expensive to produce long-term estimations, a new series of simpler models was developed starting from 1990 with Talent's particle-in-a-box. These models, characterised by a limited number of ordinary differential equations, provide a trend evolution that links certain practices (such as launch traffic, ASAT or disposal adherence to the 25 years rule) to the outcomes of the evolution.

== Overview ==
A space debris model is a mathematical or numerical description of a series of physical phenomena that replicates (partly or completely) the underlying effects of debris on the near-Earth space region. As any other physical model, it must be used within the predefined validity ranges that are derived from the combination of the founding assumptions of the mathematical descriptions of the model.

Depending on the scope of the model, there are several possible representations that can be employed: the selection is generally based on the desired degree of accuracy within a time frame, taking into account the significant trade-off between accuracy and numerical cost of the analysis.

=== Types of models ===
Several classification methods can be defined with respect to the available models. Three main types of models are generally recognised, based on the available knowledge, resources and scope:

- Engineering models, used to assess the flux of debris particles in specific regions to estimate the risk that an existing or planned mission may encounter during its lifetime.
- Differential models, used for fast (but generally low accuracy) forecasts of the long-term environment.
- Evolutionary models, which are instead long-term and generally high-precision models that simulate the behaviour of single objects with more complex representations of physical, economical and heuristic processes.

==== Engineering models ====
Engineering models are used to estimate the flux of particles registered in a region or encountered by a mission in order to possibly estimate the risk and the mitigations to adopt. They are generally used by spacecraft designer/planners, operators and debris researchers.

Models in this category usually employ reference debris populations computed by simulating all (or most) known debris-generating events in space and ground-based tests, therefore require frequent updates of the available population. They are generally used for limited, short-time, simulations as they are generally computationally intensive and are used to study the impact on specific missions, accounting for small-size debris (down to 1 μm). General outputs provided by these models include:

- Spatial density $\left(\frac{n_\text{elements}}{\text{km}^3}\right)$ at given locations and times;
- Cross-sectional area flux $\left(\frac{n_\text{elements}}{\text{km}^2}\right)$;
- Angular distribution of fluxes.

Engineering debris models
| Model | Organisation | Released |
|---|---|---|
| Meteoroid and space debris terrestrial environment reference (MASTER) | ESA | 1987 |
| Orbital debris engineering model (ORDEM) | NASA | 1996 |
| Space debris environment engineering model (SDEEM) | CNSA | 2015 |
| Space debris prediction and analysis - engineering (SDPA-E) | ROSCOSMOS | 2001 |

==== Differential models ====
Differential models use a set of numerically integrated differential equations (that discretise the space into regions or bins) to model the dynamical system as a whole. These are generally fast and computationally inexpensive models that are used to obtain quick and rough estimations of the long-term trends of the population.

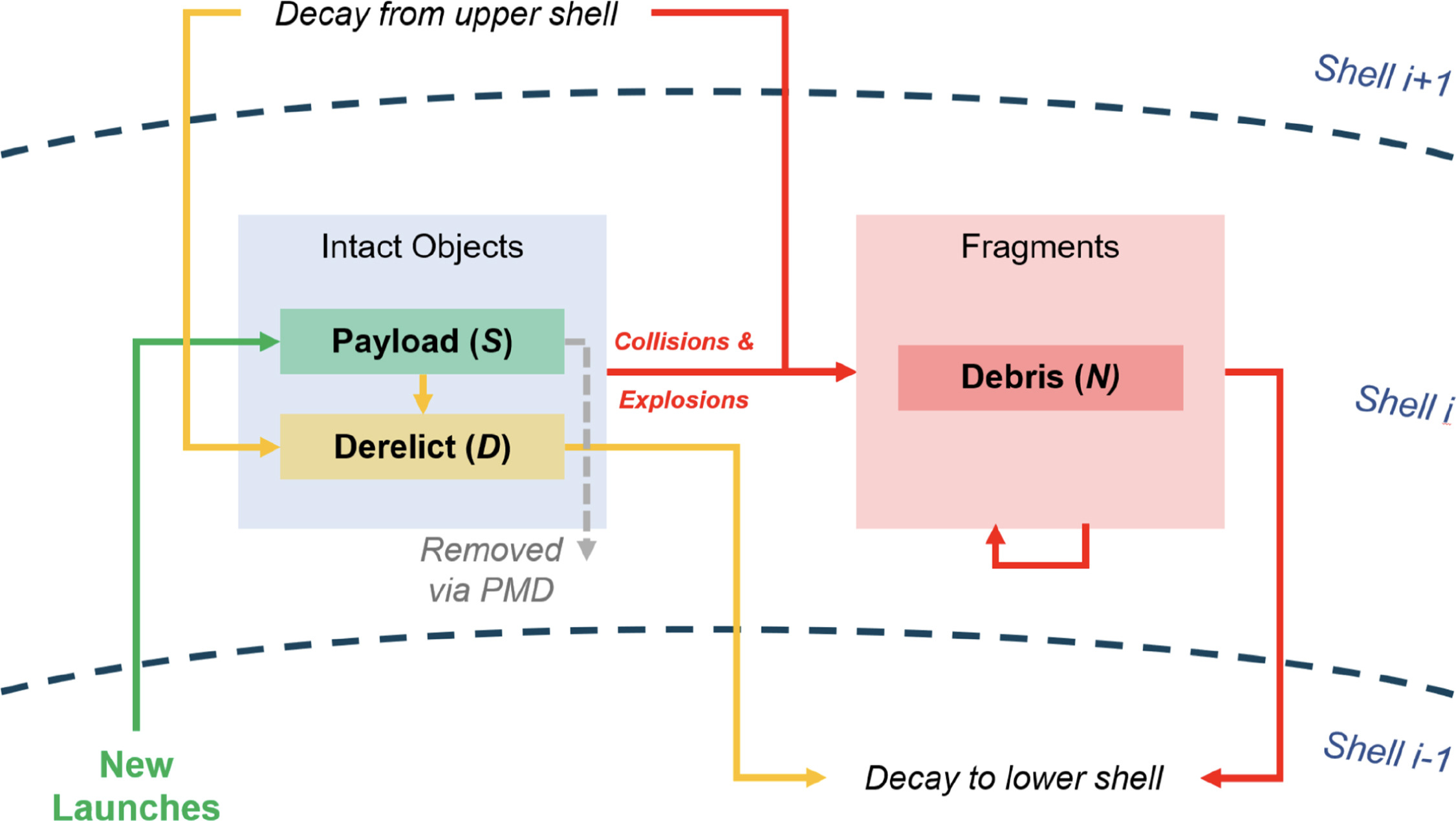
Relations between different species, sources and sinks in a PIB debris model.

A subset of these models are usually defined as particle-in-a-box (PIB) models due to the underneath assumption of (partially) neglecting the orbital motion and treating the debris as gas particles subjected to gas kinetics in a Lagrangian estimation.

It is common to classify different elements into species. Each species undergoes different dynamics or may present different physical properties. Examples of species include:

- Operative satellites, which can be launched and can explode, collide or undergo a collision, but due to station keeping cannot decay.
- Rocket bodies, which are produced with a launch and can explode, collide, decay and be involved in a collision.
- Mission-related objects, which are produced with a launch and can collide, decay and be involved in a collision.
- Debris, which are produced by fragmentation events and can collide and decay.

In general, using a state-space representation, the rate of change of debris in orbit is represented through the combination of different sources and sinks:

$\dot{N} = \sum_{j=1}^{N_\text{sources}} S_j - \sum_{j=1}^{N_\text{sinks}} S_j,$

where $N$ is the number of objects belonging to a species and S represents a modelled aspect of the population, which generally includes all or some of those presented in more detail below (launches, atmospheric re-entries, collisions, explosions, etc.). It must be noticed that the complexity of the model can vary significantly, going from a single equation that models the total number of objects in orbit to hundreds of coupled equations that study each bin and species (e.g., operative satellites, inactive satellites, debris and possibly others).

Given their simplicity, general speed and predisposition to sensitivity studies, as well as the use of state-space representations, differential and PIB models have also been used to study the implementation of control theories in order to study the best mitigations and corrective measures, allowing the discussions of policies and regulations in space operations.

Differential debris models
| Model | Organisation | Released |
|---|---|---|
| Talent | Lockheed Engineering and Sciences | 1990 |
| Farinella and Cordelli | University of Pisa | 1991 |
| Stochastic analog tool (STAT) | CNUCE/CNR | 1994 |
| Kessler | NASA | 2001 |
| Stochastic impressionistic low Earth (SIMPLE) | Indian Institute of Science | 2006 |
| Fast debris evolution model (FADE) | University of Southampton | 2009 |
| Computational adaptive strategy to control accurately the debris environment (CASCADE) | University of Southampton | 2014 |
| MIT orbital capacity assessment tool-sources sinks evolutionary model (MOCAT-SSEM) | MIT | 2024 |
| Network model for space sustainability (NESSY) | University of Strathclyde | 2024 |

==== Evolutionary models ====
Contrary to engineering models, that simulate the debris motion, and differential models, that significantly simplify the dynamics of the involved objects, the goal of evolutionary models is to achieve a high degree of precision and fidelity. This is generally achieved by simulating each object and its behaviour individually (across all possible phases, including high-precision orbital propagation and collision probability estimation).

Despite the high precision involved, stochastic processes are still inherently present in the models due to the many uncertainties in the interactions; therefore, a single execution of the model is generally not enough, and multiple Monte Carlo runs are necessary to obtain reliable data.

Evolutionary debris models
| Model | Organisation | Released |
|---|---|---|
| EVOLVE | NASA | 1991 |
| Space debris mitigation long-term analysis program (SDM) | ASI | 1995 |
| Long term utility for collision analysis (LUCA) | TU Branuschweig/DLR | 1998 |
| Space debris prediction and analysis (SDPA) | ROSCOSMOS | 2000 |
| Debris environment long term analysis (DELTA) | ESA | 2001 |
| Debris analysis and monitoring architecture to the geosynchronous environment (DAMAGE) | University of Southampton | 2001 |
| LEO-to-GEO environment debris model (LEGEND) | NASA | 2003 |
| Near Earth orbit debris environment evolutionary model (NEODEEM) | Kyushu University/JAXA | 2009 |
| Aerospace debris environment projection tool (ADEPT) | Aerospace Corporation | 2009 |
| Modelling the evolution of debris on Earth's environment (MEDEE) | CNES | 2012 |
| Space objects long-term evolution model (SOLEM) | CNSA | 2019 |
| MOCAT-Monte Carlo (MOCAT-MC) | MIT | 2023 |

== Components of a debris model ==
A space debris model generally decomposes the modelling of all the complex physical interactions and processes into independent "blocks" or components, each of which performs a specific task. Depending on the complexity and the scope of the model, some or all the following components are included in different complexity shapes.

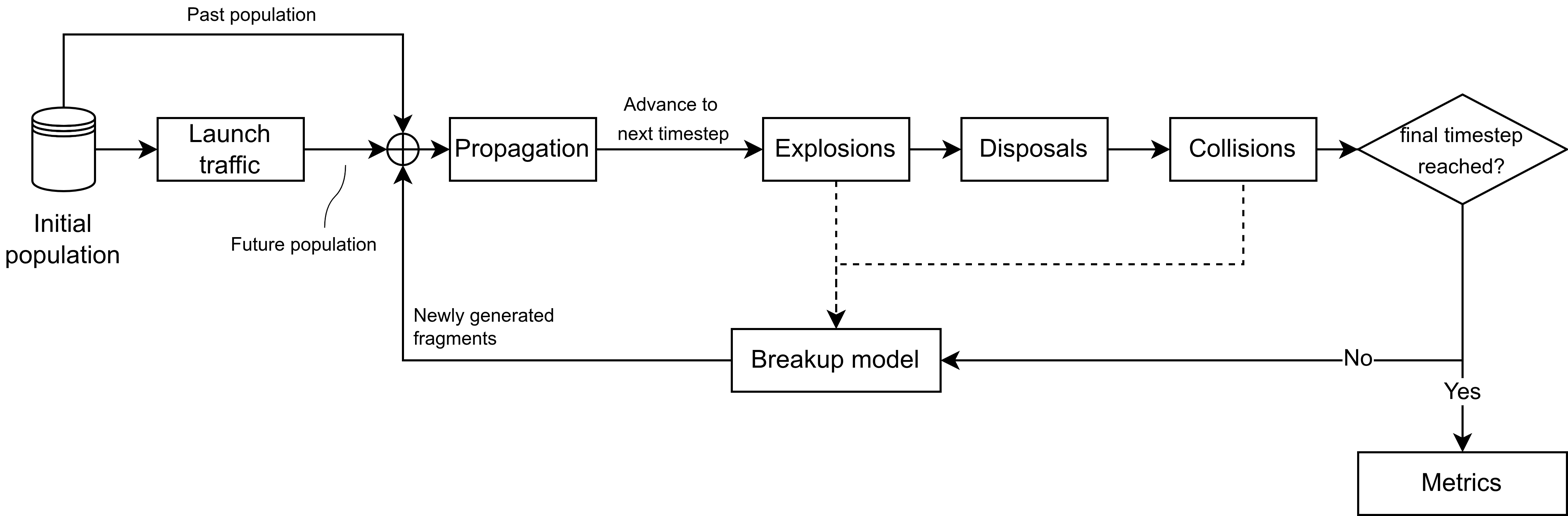
General structure of a space debris model using a time sequence process.

The components, from an implementation point of view, can vary from being plug-ins of the main program, such as in the case of LUCA2, to being simple equation terms, such as in the case of most PIBs.

=== Initial population ===
The initial or background population is constituted by all the existing objects that are already in orbit by the select initial date of the simulation. Depending on the goal of the simulation and of the model, the initial date may be one of the following:

- the current solar year for long-term propagations,
- the date of launch of Sputnik 1 for historical validations of the model, or
- a specific satellite launch date for fluxes analysis.

The initial population is generally selected from external catalogues, which may include:

- Two-line elements (TLEs) catalogues such as CelesTrak or Space Track;
- Populations created with high-fidelity models (e.g., derived from MASTER or ORDEM which were generated by existing fragmentation events);
- Space catalogues such as ESA's database and information system characterising objects in space (DISCOS).

=== Launch Traffics ===
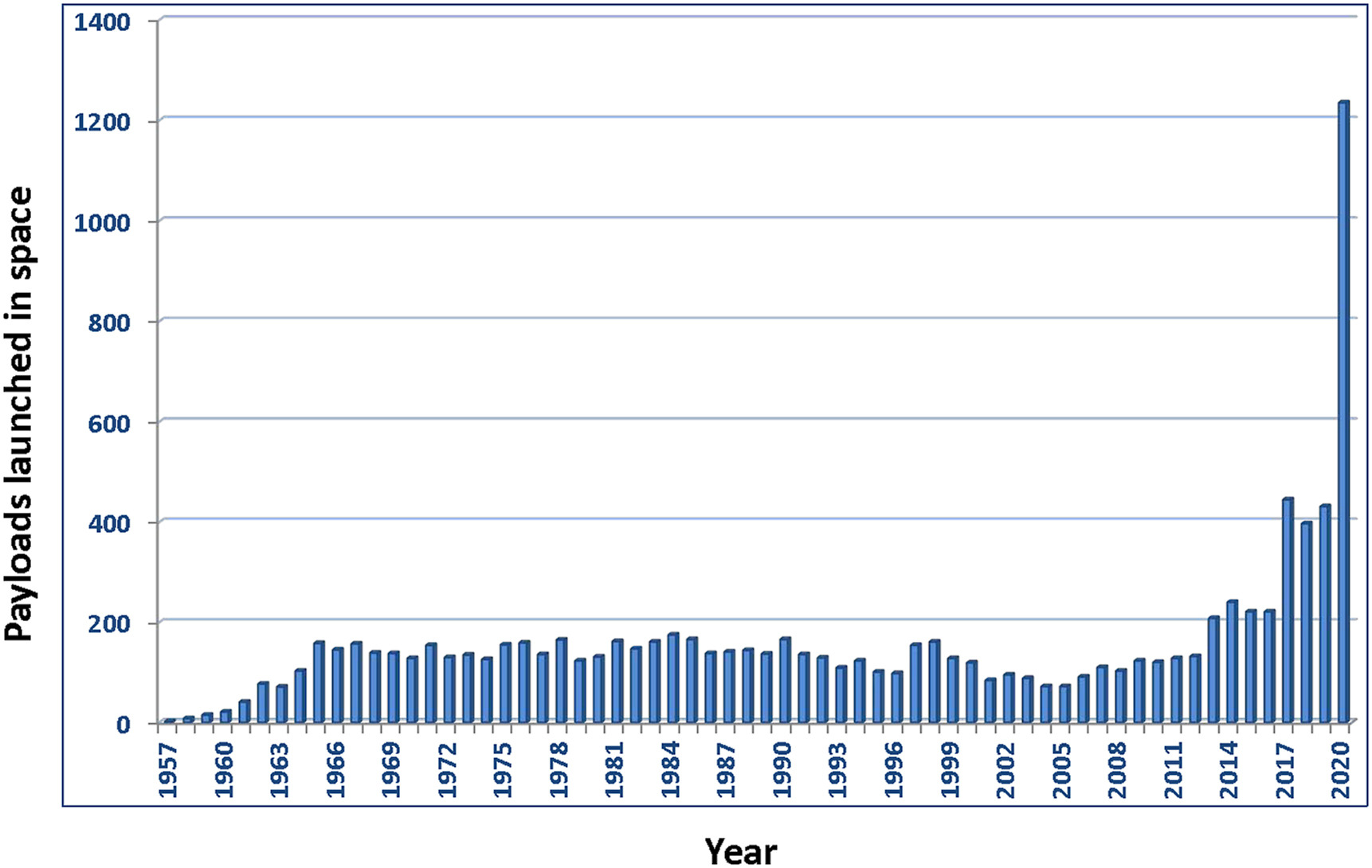
Payload launched in space from 1957 to 2020: the increase of constellations deployments in the 2010s provokes a significant increase of launches.

The scope of this component is to return a distribution of launches and new missions to supply new objects to be propagated. Generally, two approaches are taken:

- repeated launch traffic is used. In this case, the new objects are a (possibly scaled) copy of a predetermined period of time (e.g., the last 10 years before the simulation initial time).
- statistical representation is used, such as the use of Gompertz logistic curves, which allow for modelling and fitting with a limited number of parameters the rate of changes in the launch population.

=== Propagator ===
The knowledge of the evolution of the position of objects in time is obtained by propagating them with an orbit propagator. As the rest of the model, different equations and degrees of complexity can be used, varying from the consideration of all main perturbations (atmospheric drag, geopotential, solar radiation pressure, and other bodies attractions) over all the Keplerian elements to entirely neglecting the propagation as in many PIB models.

In general, propagators can be classified as:

- Semi-analytic models, where the short-period perturbations are neglected, such as MEANPROP and STELA;
- Probabilistic models, where the objects are propagated using different equations than the orbital motion, such as McInnes's formulation of the continuity equation used in CiELO.

The propagator generally handles the disposal of the active populations at the end of the operative life. Despite being an important phase of the developing life of a spacecraft, the disposal faces two main challenges:

- The intention to cooperate with the current standards that have defined the 25-years rule, that is the fact that any spacecraft should be considered disposed, either to a graveyard orbit or to atmospheric re-entry within 25 years since the nominal end of life.
- The possibility to cooperate, usually modelled with a success rate evaluation, as the necessary manoeuvres to reach the disposal orbit may fail or be too fuel-expensive (i.e., the ΔV may be excessive).

=== Collision probability estimator ===
The collision probability estimator returns a collision probability based on the collision rate of the population. Generally, two kinds of models are considered:

- Orbit-Trace, based on the determination of orbit intersections and timing analyses. These processes require the introduction of additional filters to correct the inaccuracies with respect to synchronised objects, which generally result in an increased computational time and higher information requirement.
- Cube, which instead uses a gas-kinetics-like process where collision rates are estimated by considering the spatial density in a specific bin (the "cube").

=== Explosions model ===
Historically, explosions, generally due to failures in the electric or propulsive system of the spacecraft or produced by "killer satellite" tests, have been the main source of space debris. Already in 1976 it was estimated that 31 satellites had already exploded, being around 1% of the population.

Explosions are generally a highly stochastic event with few reliable ways that are able to provide a valid estimation besides the use of past statistic data. For this reason, explosions are generally tuned in order to produce realistic data with the use of empirical explosion rate models and require the use of Monte Carlo simulations.

Some tools allow scaling down the explosion rate by considering the technological improvements in the future, as it is expected that collisions will be the main source of fragments in the near future.

=== Breakup model ===
The breakup model is tasked with producing, from the parent object(s), the number and the spatial and physical distribution of the fragments to be produced. The following models can be distinguished:

- Empirical models, based on curve fitting obtained from experimental databases. They are simpler but less accurate.
- Semi-analytic models are based on the theoretical physics of the problem and later calibrated on experimental data.
- Complex models, which instead are based on physics principles only.

A widely used model is currently the NASA standard breakup model; however, many other models exist, such as IMPACT or the collision simulation tool (CST). Depending on the energy involved (with a threshold set at 40 J/g), a collision is generally modelled as catastrophic or non-catastrophic, with significant differences in terms of number of produced debris.

=== Post-processing ===
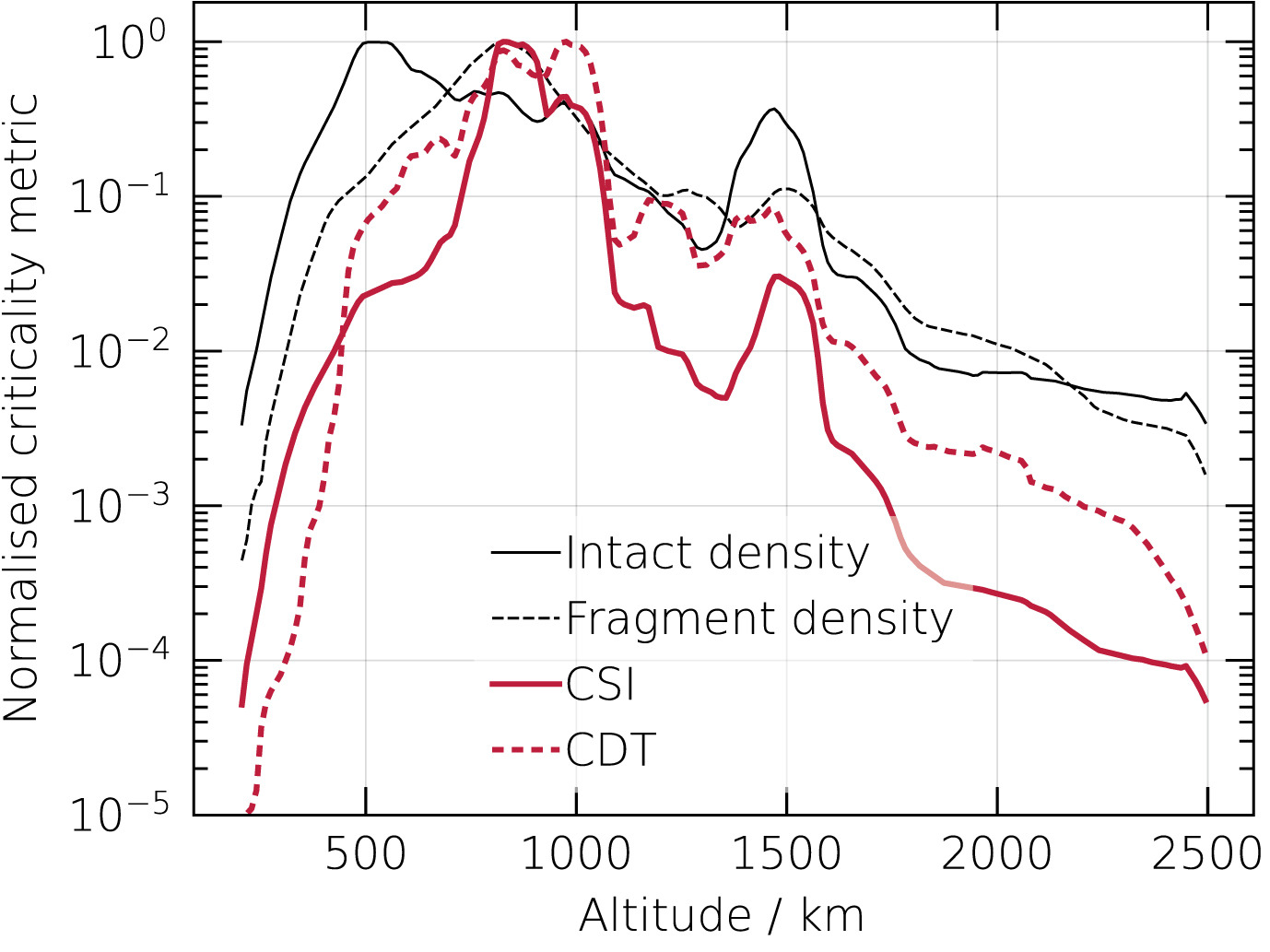
Distribution of different metrics (Densities, CSI and CDT) in LEO during 2023.

The post-processing component is tasked with data elaboration, that is, to obtain information from the raw data that has been generated from the simulations. The actual scope of this module depends on the scope of the implemented model itself, but in general it is tasked with the generation of metrics.

In the field of space sustainability, metrics are an effective way to measure the impact of a specific mission on the environment (and constitute the so-called mission-based metrics) or the current state of a specific region itself (called environmental-based metrics). Several metrics, both simple and complex (i.e., those that are generated from a combination of different sources), have been defined to cover all the possible use cases of the outputs of the models; as a non-exhaustive list:

- Number of inactive objects (or inactive mass) at a specific epoch.
- Number of conjunctions, risk reduction manoeuvres or collisions in time.
- Occupation of an orbital volume and density of occupation.
- Statistical most concerning (SMC) objects, which select the objects that are most likely to collide by determining their risk given by the product of probability and consequence of collisions.
- Environmental consequences of orbital breakup (ECOB), which determines the risk given by the product of probability and severity.

== See also ==
- Space debris
- Space sustainability
- Kessler syndrome
- List of space debris producing events
- 2007 Chinese anti-satellite missile test
- Inter-Agency Space Debris Coordination Committee
