= Space Environment Information System =

The SPace ENVironment Information System (SPENVIS) is an ESA operational software developed and maintained at Belgian Institute for Space Aeronomy since 1996. It provides a web-based interface for assessing the Space environment and its effects on spacecraft systems and crews. An international user community uses the system for various purposes, e.g. mission analysis and planning, educational support, and running models for scientific applications. SPENVIS also includes extensive background information on the space environment and the environment models.
