= SEDAT =

Data system of the European Space Agency

SEDAT ("Space Environment DATa System") provides access to near-original satellite data on the space environment in order to perform analyses and queries needed for evaluation of space environment hazards.

== History ==
The development was performed between 1999 and 2001 by the Rutherford Appleton Laboratory (RAL) and funded by the European Space Agency via its Space Environments and Effects Section.

== Description ==
The aim of the SEDAT project is to develop a new approach to the engineering analysis of the spacecraft charged-particle environments. The project assembled a database containing a large and comprehensive set of data about that environment as measured in-situ by a number of space plasma missions. The user is able to select a set of space environment data appropriate to the engineering problem under study. The project developed a set of software tools, which can operate on the data retrieved from the SEDAT database. These tools allow the user to carry out a wide range of engineering analyses.

This approach differs from traditional space environment engineering studies. In the latter the space environment is characterised by a model that is a synthesis of previous observations. However, in SEDAT the environment is characterised directly by the observations. This approach offers several advantages to the engineering analyst:

- The data used in the study can be tailored more precisely to the engineering problem under study.
- The analysis is not constrained by selection effects within the model used.
- The analyst may tailor the processing of the data to the problem under study.
- The analysis is not constrained by binning or other processing effects that were used to generate the model.
- New data are readily incorporated in the database and thus made available for engineering analyses.

The traditional approach would require the production, validation and dissemination of an updated model, which is a far more time-consuming activity.

The SEDAT concept foresees access to distributed datasets, capture of processing methods and openness in analysis tools.

== SEDAT implementation ==
The implementation of SEDAT is divided into three main parts:

1. Construction of the SEDAT database, based in the STPDF.
2. Production of the analysis tools to be used in conjunction with the SEDAT database, based on IDL routines.
3. Execution of four small exercises, using the SEDAT database and tools, to demonstrate that these functions operate correctly.

Four demonstrations of the SEDAT system were performed in the original study:

- Update of solar proton model (RAL-SED-TN-0301)
- Radiation dose calculation for interplanetary mission (RAL-SED-TN-0302)
- Correlation of electron fluxes with spacecraft anomalies (RAL-SED-TN-0303)
- Electron fluorescence on XMM (RAL-SED-TN-0304)
