= Passivation (spacecraft) =

Removal of internal energy in a spaceship at end of its mission

The passivation of a spacecraft is the depletion of all remaining energy onboard the vehicle at the end of its mission or useful life. This is done to minimise the probability of self-explosion or explosion after hypervelocity impacts with space debris or micrometeorites. Spent upper stages are generally passivated after their use as launch vehicles is complete, as are satellites when they can no longer be used for their design purpose.

== Purpose and necessity ==
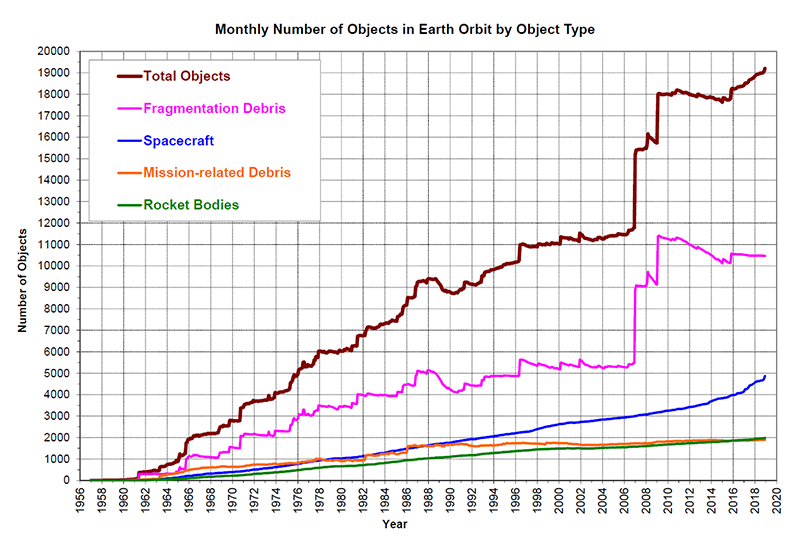
Objects in Earth orbit including fragmentation debris, November 2020, NASA: ODPO

Orbital space debris is generated in significant quantities when satellites and orbital stages of launch vehicles break apart in collisions or explosions. This was a fairly common outcome for many of the U.S. and Soviet rocket designs from the 1960s to the 1980s. It remains an occasional problem with derelict second stages left in higher Earth orbits; several U.S. rocket stages fragmented in 2018 and 2019.

Internally stored energy generally takes the form of unused propellant, battery charge, and reaction wheel momentum.

Over time, leftover propellant may decompose into its chemical components, potentially increasing pressure inside fuel tanks. Even when this does not cause tank rupture, risk remains from hypervelocity collisions with orbital debris. Studies have show that the probability of a pressure vessel rupturing upon impact is directly linked to its internal pressure when impacted. Batteries are vulnerable to thermal runaway if exposed to high temperatures, while batteries which remain connected to power sources may be inadvertently overcharged. Both can lead to spacecraft fragmentation.

== Methods ==
=== Propellant passivation ===
Passivation of propellant systems involves discharging remaining liquid propellant or pressurant gas into space. Due to the effects of microgravity, often a significant amount of residue from liquid propellant will remain after discharging. One proposed method for ejecting remaining liquid propellant residue involves rotating the spacecraft and injecting compressed gas into the propellant tank to create a vortex effect inside it. The gas flow can then carry away liquid droplets to be ejected from the spacecraft. Several European space programs have determined venting all propellant fluids is extremely challenging, if not impossible. Therefore ESA-funded programs tend to take a "make-safe" approach in which propellant tanks are depressurised to a level where the probability of explosion is sufficiently low. For monopropellant satellites in low Earth orbit (LEO), this corresponds to a final fuel pressure of less than ~73 psi (500 kPa). For bipropellant satellites in geostationary orbit (GEO), this corresponds to a final fuel pressure of less than ~7 psi (48 kPa) and a final oxidiser pressure of less than ~40 psi (280 kPa). However, there is no comprehensive study establishing the ideal quantitative pressure thresholds.

=== Electrical passivation ===
Electrical passivation intends to deplete or otherwise make safe the spacecraft's onboard battery. The battery is discharged as low as possible at the end of the mission, and measures are taken to prevent its recharge. The battery may be disconnected electrically with relays or switches, and its remaining energy discharged through resistors. Solar arrays can be similarly disconnected, or short circuited through relays or diodes to prevent continued power generation.

== Passivation requirements ==
The International Telecommunication Union (ITU) and United Nations (UN) recommend that satellites in geosynchronous orbit be designed to move themselves to a disposal orbit some 350 kilometres (220 mi) above the GEO belt, and then remove internally stored energy. Most GEO satellites conform to these recommendations, although there are no enforcement mechanisms.

Within national regimes, where national governments can control the launch licenses of launch vehicles and spacecraft, there are some enforceable requirements for passivation.

=== United States ===
The U.S. government has a set of standard practices for civilian (NASA) and military (DoD/USSF) orbital debris mitigation that require passivation for space launches with U.S. launch licenses. "All on-board sources of stored energy of a spacecraft or upper stage should be depleted or safed when they are no longer required for mission operations or post mission disposal. Depletion should occur as soon as such an operation does not pose an unacceptable risk to the payload. Propellant depletion burns and compressed gas releases should be designed to minimize the probability of subsequent accidental collision and to minimize the impact of a subsequent accidental explosion."

Passivation practice on many launches in recent decades has not mitigated second-stage breakups. Upper stage deflagration/breakup events have continued even with newer rocket designs of the 2010s, long after the negative externality of space debris became widely considered as a much larger problem. Multiple recent debris-producing events are linked to upper stages.
