= Kosmos 2421 =

Russian spy satellite

Kosmos 2421 (Cosmos 2421) was a Russian reconnaissance satellite launched in 2006, but began fragmenting in early 2008. It also had the Konus-A science payload designed by Ioffe Institute to detect gamma-ray bursts. Three separate fragmentation events produced about 500 pieces of trackable debris. About half of those had already re-entered Earth's atmosphere by the fall of 2008.

== Satellite life span ==
Kosmos 2421 was launched on June 25, 2006, on a Tsyklon-2 from the Site 90/20 launch pad at Baikonur. Other designations are 2006-026A and NORAD 29247. It is a US-PU/Legenda type satellite, and was in a 65 degree, 93 minute circular orbit 410–430 km up. The main body of the satellite finally re-entered and burned up on 19 August 2010.

There have been 190 known satellite breakups between 1961 and 2006. Kosmos 2421 was one of the top ten space debris producing events up to 2012. There was estimated to be 500,000 pieces of debris in orbit at that time.

== Space station maneuver ==
On August 27, 2008, the International Space Station (ISS) fired the boosters of the Jules Verne automated transfer vehicle to avoid debris fragment 33246 from the remains of Kosmos 2421. Without a change, that piece was predicted to have a 1 in 72 chance of hitting the station. Kosmos 2421 had been in a higher orbit than ISS, so when ISS's apogee (high point of orbit) surpassed the debris field's perigee (low point of orbit), many fragments would cross ISS's orbit.

== See also ==
- Space debris
- Fengyun-1C
- 2009 satellite collision (Kosmos 2251 and Iridium 33)
- Kosmos 954
- List of space debris producing events
