= Spacecraft cemetery =

Area in the South Pacific Ocean where spacecraft have been routinely deposited

Approx. location of the spacecraft cemetery in the South Pacific Ocean

The spacecraft cemetery, also known as spacecraft graveyard or spacecraft junkyard, known more formally as the South Pacific Ocean(ic) Uninhabited Area—is a region near, but beyond the southern edge of Polynesia, more specifically the South Pacific Ocean east of New Zealand—where spacecraft that have reached the end of their usefulness are routinely crashed. The area is roughly centered on "Point Nemo", the oceanic pole of inaccessibility, the location farthest from any land.

The defunct space station Mir and six Salyut stations are among those that have been ditched there. Other spacecraft that have been routinely scuttled in the region include various cargo spacecraft to the International Space Station, including Russian Progress cargo craft, the Japan Aerospace Exploration Agency H-II Transfer Vehicle, and the European Space Agency's Automated Transfer Vehicle. A total of more than 263 spacecraft were disposed in this area between 1971 and 2016. The International Space Station is slated to end up in the spacecraft cemetery upon "retirement".

Current considerations of the spacecraft cemetery include the environmental impact it creates on marine life within the South Pacific Ocean Uninhabited Region. This region is beyond the legal jurisdiction of any country, and therefore faces less regulation. Currently two treaties outline certain laws that can be applied to the spacecraft cemetery. The Outer Space Treaty produced by the United Nations reflects on damages caused by spacecraft on opposing nations. The United Nations Convention on the Law of the Sea reflects on general marine pollution. In rare cases, marine pollution could be caused by spillage of the highly toxic rocket propellant hydrazine. Other forms of space debris removal are being considered and produced to slow the exponential growth of space debris orbiting Earth due to increased space exploration.

== Purpose ==
Earth's spacecraft cemetery is used as a site for spacecraft that have reached their lifetime limit due to fatigue, lack of propellant or other problems and must be retired. Larger spacecraft too massive to burn up during re-entry into the Earth's atmosphere are controlled to crash / splash down in Earth's spacecraft cemetery, a location in the ocean remote from inhabited regions. The use of this remote location protects inhabited regions from harm during re-entry and impact. The spacecraft cemetery region contains between 250 and 300 various spacecraft, and has been used by multiple international space exploration organizations, including crafts from China, Russia, and other countries. Currently, the International Space Station is slated to enter the spacecraft cemetery at the end of its lifespan.

== Location ==
The spacecraft cemetery is located inside the South Pacific Ocean Uninhabited Area, a region in the southern Pacific Ocean to the east of the geographic center of the water hemisphere (47°24′42″S 177°22′45″E). The area, roughly centered on "Point Nemo", the oceanic pole of inaccessibility, is furthest away from any land. The nearest islands are over 2,600 kilometres (1,600 mi) away from the center. This location has been chosen for its remoteness and limited shipping traffic so as not to endanger human life with any falling debris.

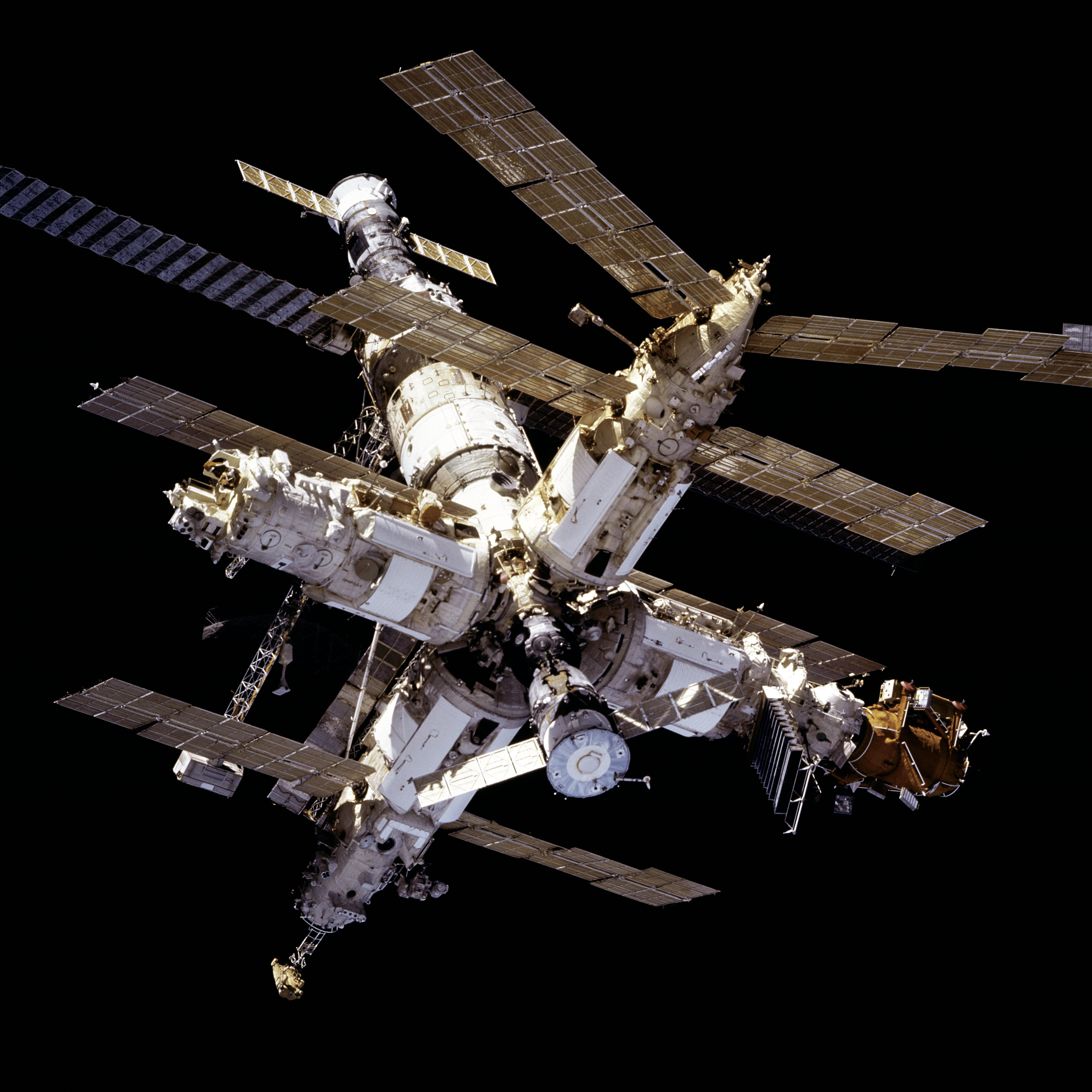
Mir, a space station operated by the Soviet Union, and later by Russia, from 1986 to 2001. It was deposited in the Spacecraft Cemetery in March of 2001.

== Incidents ==
Map of the space station Mir re-entry path

At least 264 spacecraft were disposed in this area between 1971 and 2016. The defunct space station Mir and six Salyut stations are among the nearly 200 pieces of Russian spacecraft debris in this region, making Russia the largest contributor of spacecraft in the cemetery. The remaining pieces of debris in the cemetery belong to the United States, Europe, Japan, and private organizations.

The decommissioning of Tiangong-1, the first Chinese space station, was an unsuccessful targeted re-entry at Point Nemo. During an extended mission phase, control was lost due to a power failure, leading to an uncontrolled landing outside of the spacecraft cemetery.

== Laws ==
Since the South Pacific Ocean Uninhabited Area is beyond the jurisdiction of any country, very few laws restrict the activity of nations within this area. International treaties exist but do not clearly assign responsibility to countries about the liability for damages and pollution caused by re-entering space debris.

Among the pertinent regulations, two general agreements concerning space debris and marine pollution are often expanded upon to govern the spacecraft cemetery.

First, the Outer Space Treaty proposed by the United Nations dictates that each state party is subject to the damages to other state parties caused by part of the registered spacecraft on the Earth, which include the ocean. Therefore, countries are obliged to take action when disposal of registered spacecraft into the ocean causes damages to other parties. However, space debris in the ocean is often left unclaimed.

In the perspective of ocean preservation, the United Nations Convention on the Law of the Sea, also known as Law of the Sea Convention (LOSC), commands that all states have the duty of protecting and preventing marine environment from pollution, even outside the jurisdiction of any state. Nevertheless, this article is only practical when space debris is considered harmful to the marine environment.

== Environmental impacts ==
With 47% of re-entry mass coming from controlled re-entries, chemical spillage poses a risk to the marine environment. Hydrazine, a widely used rocket propellant that is highly toxic to living organisms, may occasionally survive re-entry. Radioactive chemicals present in spacecraft are also a cause for concern in the industry.

There are numerous domestic and international regulatory bodies intended to mitigate potential environmental damage caused by spacecraft pollution. The United Nations Convention on the Law of the Sea is an international treaty overseeing marine pollution and its contributors. This agreement defines pollution using three conditions: 1) the object must have been introduced into the environment by man, 2) the object contains substances, 3) the object must be detrimental to living organisms. Because it is difficult to know how much of a substance remains after it enters the atmosphere, the potential environmental risk of a specific spacecraft entering the cemetery may be unknown, leaving much of the treaty up for interpretation.

Additionally, the EPA provides protocols on marine pollution, assigning the responsibility for pollution mitigation to those who contribute to it, and addresses regional cooperation between nations in order to find the least harmful solutions to debris disposal.

== Space debris disposal ==
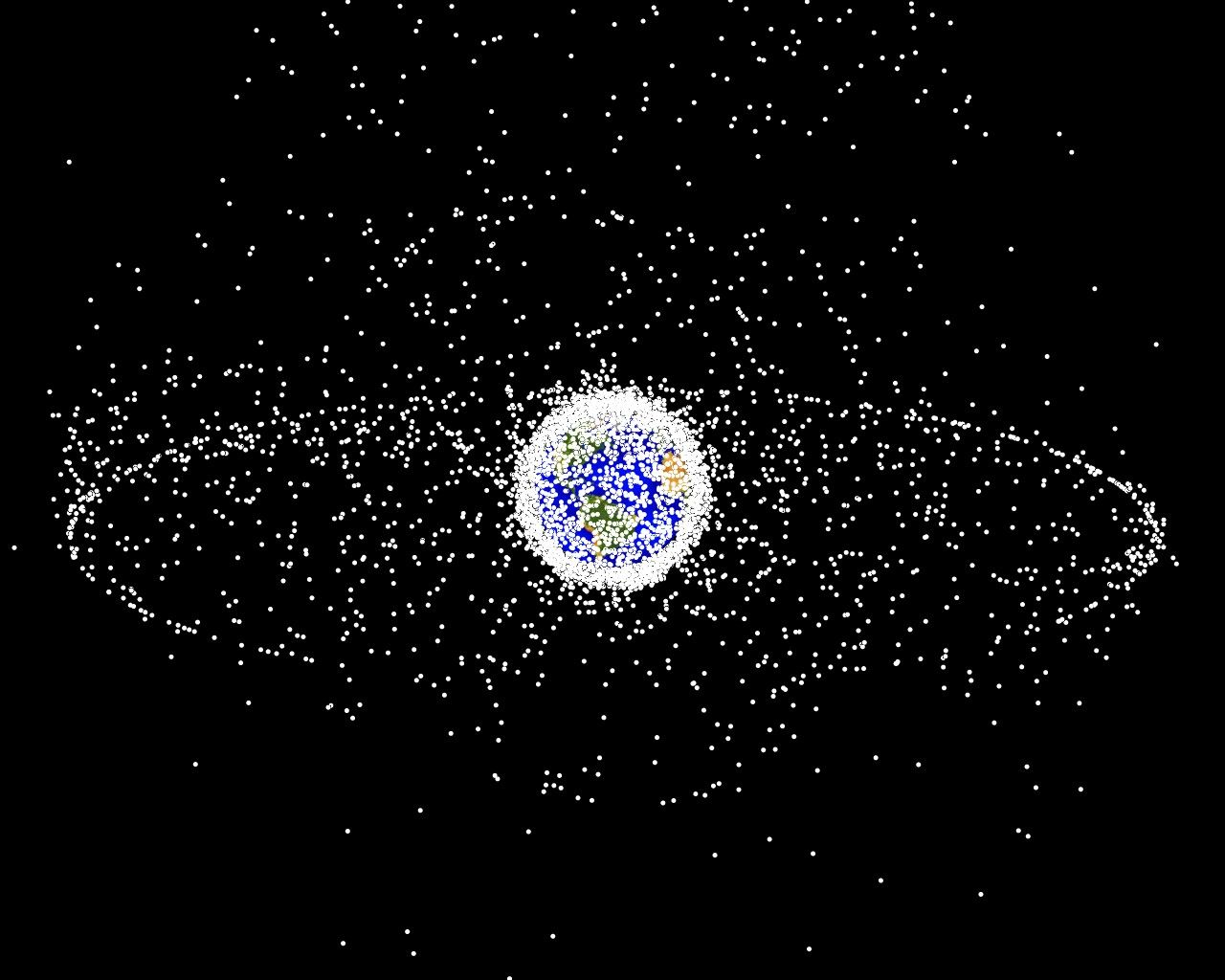
A computer-generated representation of space debris orbiting Earth in 1980, produced by NASA.

Space debris is any form of man-made object orbiting the Earth that no longer serves a useful function. As of 2019 more than 20,000 pieces of softball size or greater space debris orbit Earth, threatening the safety of human and robotic missions, as well as causing damage to spacecraft. There are few space debris removal processes, one of which is depositing large spacecraft in the spacecraft cemetery on earth, although, due to exhausted maneuvering fuel reserves, in the past this was rarely done.

The most common way to eliminate space debris, when actually done, is to de-orbit crafts, causing them to burn up during re-entry into the Earth's atmosphere due to high velocities and air compression resulting in a temperature increase of air and the craft's surface. Other common and less controlled processes for space removal include allowing the crafts to decay, collide with other objects, or causing them to explode, resulting in smaller pieces of space debris. As of 2021, new processes for space debris removal are being developed to reduce the unabated proliferation of space debris orbiting earth, such as nets, magnetized collecting arms, and more.

== See also ==
- Aircraft boneyard
- Atmospheric reentry
- Graveyard orbit
- Ship graveyard
- Space archaeology
- Space debris
- Wrecking yard
- Space sustainability
- Splashdown
