= Space environment =

Study of how space conditions affect spacecraft

In astronautics, aerospace engineering and space physics, the study of space environment is concerned with the conditions existing in space, and their effects on the design and operation of spacecraft. A related subject, space weather, deals with dynamic processes in the solar-terrestrial system that can give rise to effects on spacecraft, but that can also affect the atmosphere, ionosphere and geomagnetic field, giving rise to several other kinds of effects on human technologies.

Effects on spacecraft can arise from radiation, space debris and meteoroid impact, upper atmospheric drag and spacecraft electrostatic charging. Various mitigation strategies have been adopted.

== Radiation ==
Radiation in space usually comes from three main sources:

1. The Van Allen radiation belts
2. Solar proton events and solar energetic particles; and
3. Galactic cosmic rays.

For long-duration missions, the high doses of radiation can damage electronic components and solar cells. A major concern is also radiation-induced "single-event effects" such as single-event upset. Crewed missions usually avoid the radiation belts and the International Space Station is at an altitude well below the most severe regions of the radiation belts. During solar energetic events (solar flares and coronal mass ejections) particles can be accelerated to very high energies and can reach the Earth in times as short as 30 minutes (but usually take some hours). These particles are mainly protons and heavier ions that can cause radiation damage, disruption to logic circuits, and even hazards to astronauts. Crewed missions to return to the Moon or to travel to Mars will have to deal with the major problems presented by solar particle events to radiation safety, in addition to the important contribution to doses from the low-level background cosmic rays. In near-Earth orbits, the Earth's magnetic field screens spacecraft from a large part of these hazards - a process called geomagnetic shielding.

== Debris ==
Space debris are defunct human-made objects in space, and, along with other objects like meteoroids, can impact spacecraft at high speeds, causing mechanical or electrical damage. The average speed of space debris is 10 km/s (22,000 mph; 36,000 km/h) while the average speed of meteoroids is much greater. For example, the meteoroids associated with the Perseid meteor shower travel at an average speed of 58 km/s (130,000 mph; 210,000 km/h). Mechanical damage from debris impacts have been studied through space missions including LDEF, which had over 20,000 documented impacts through its 5.7-year mission. Electrical anomalies associated with impact events include ESA's Olympus spacecraft, which lost attitude control during the 1993 Perseid meteor shower. A similar event occurred with the Landsat 5 spacecraft during the 2009 Perseid meteor shower.

== Spacecraft charging ==
A spacecraft may accumulate electrical charge as a result of the hot plasma environment around the Earth. During geomagnetic substorms, disturbances in the solar wind can heat up the plasma encountered in the geostationary orbit. "Hot" electrons (with energies in the kilo-electron volt range) collect on surfaces of spacecraft and can establish electrostatic potentials of the order of kilovolts. As a result, discharges can occur and are known to be the source of many spacecraft anomalies.

== Mitigation ==
Methods to counter the space environment include, but are not limited to, spacecraft shielding, radiation hardening of electronic systems, and various collision detection systems. Evaluation of effects during spacecraft design includes application of various models of the environment, including radiation belt models, spacecraft-plasma interaction models and atmospheric models to predict drag effects encountered in lower orbits and during reentry.

The field often overlaps with the disciplines of astrophysics, atmospheric science, space physics, and geophysics, albeit usually with an emphasis on application.

The United States government maintains a Space Weather Prediction Center at Boulder, Colorado. The Space Weather Prediction Center (SWPC) is part of the National Oceanic and Atmospheric Administration (NOAA). SWPC is one of the National Weather Service's (NWS) National Centers for Environmental Prediction (NCEP).

== Law ==
Environmental law in space law is being considered, it has particularly become an issue in light of increased space debris, but space environment as an issue lacks regulatory establishment.

== Space environmentalism ==
Space environmentalism is an advocacy that sees space as not devoid of needing regulation and protection, and has gained attention by an increasing number of academics, such as Moriba Jah.

== See also ==
- ECSS standard E-ST-10-04C on Space environment
- Graveyard orbit
- Karman line
- Outer space
- Outline of space science
- Space climate
- Spacecraft cemetery
- Space Environment Data System (SEDAT)
- Space Environment Information System (SPENVIS)
- Space weathering
- Effects of ionizing radiation in spaceflight
