= Satellite collision =

Collision involving one or more satellites in orbit

Strictly speaking, a satellite collision is when two satellites collide while in orbit around a third, much larger body, such as a planet or moon. This definition is typically loosely extended to include collisions between sub-orbital or escape-velocity objects with an object in orbit. Prime examples are the anti-satellite weapon tests. There have been no observed collisions between natural satellites, but impact craters may show evidence of such events. Both intentional and unintentional collisions have occurred between man-made satellites around Earth since the 1980s. Anti-satellite weapon tests and failed rendezvous or docking operations can result in orbital space debris, which in turn may collide with other satellites.

== Natural-satellite collisions ==
There have been no observed collisions between natural satellites of any Solar System planet or moon. Collision candidates for past events are:

- Impact craters on many Jupiter (Jovian) and Saturn's (Saturnian) moons. They may have been formed by collisions with smaller moons, but they could equally likely have been formed by impacts with asteroids and comets during the Late Heavy Bombardment.
- The far side of the Moon may have formed from the impact of a smaller moon that also formed during the giant impact event that created the Moon.
- The objects making up the Rings of Saturn are believed to continually collide and aggregate with each other, leading to debris with limited size constrained to a thin plane. Although this is believed to be an ongoing process, this has not been directly observed.

== Artificial-satellite collisions ==
Three types of collisions have occurred involving artificial satellites orbiting the Earth:

- Intentional collisions intended to destroy the satellites, either to test anti-satellite weapons or destroy satellites which may pose a hazard should they reenter the atmosphere intact:
  - Several tests conducted as part of the Soviet Union's Istrebitel Sputnikov programme in the 1970s and 80s, involving IS-A satellites intercepting and destroying IS-P, DS-P1-M and Lira target satellites launched specifically for the tests.
  - The 1985 destruction of the USA P78-1 solar research satellite during a USA ASM-135 anti-satellite missile test.
  - The 2007 destruction of the Chinese Fungyun FY-1C weather satellite during a Chinese anti-satellite missile test.
  - The 2008 destruction of the USA-193 military reconnaissance satellite in a decaying orbit by a USA SM-3 missile.
  - The 2019 destruction of Microsat-R after Indian military launched an anti-satellite weapon (ASAT) to destroy an Indian telecom satellite in a move called "Mission Shakti".
- Unintentional low-speed collisions during failed rendezvous and docking operations:
  - The 1994 collision between the crewed Soyuz TM-17 spacecraft and the Russian Mir space station.
  - The 1997 low-speed collision between the Progress M-34 supply ship and the Russian Mir space station during manual docking manoeuvers.
  - The 2005 low-speed collision between the USA DART spacecraft and the USA MUBLCOM communications satellite during orbital rendezvous manoeuvers.
- Unintentional high-speed collisions between active satellites and orbital debris:
  - The 1991 collision between Kosmos 1934 and Mission-related debris (1977-062C, 13475).
  - The 1996 collision between the French Cerise military reconnaissance satellite and debris from an Ariane rocket.
  - The 2009 collision between the Iridium 33 communications satellite and the derelict Russian Kosmos 2251 spacecraft, which resulted in the destruction of both satellites.
  - The 22 January 2013 collision between debris from Fengyun FY-1C satellite and the Russian BLITS nano-satellite.
  - The 22 May 2013 collision between two CubeSats, Ecuador's NEE-01 Pegaso and Argentina's CubeBug-1, and the particles of a debris cloud around a Tsyklon-3 upper stage (SCN 15890) left over from the launch of Kosmos 1666.
  - The 18 March 2021 collision between Yunhai-1 02 and debris from the Zenit-2 rocket body that launched the Kosmos 2333 satellite (a Tselina-2 satellite) in 1996.

== Spacecraft impacts with moons ==
- The first spacecraft to impact the Earth's Moon was the USSR Luna 2 on September 14, 1959. For a complete list of spacecraft impacts and controlled landings on the Moon, see List of man-made objects on the Moon. Also see Timeline of Moon exploration and List of lunar probes.
- There have been no spacecraft collisions with the Martian moons.
- There have been no spacecraft collisions with any Jovian moons. Note that to avoid collision with Europa and possible contamination by Earth microbes, the NASA Galileo spacecraft was intentionally deorbited into Jupiter's atmosphere on September 21, 2003.
- There have been no spacecraft collisions with any Saturnian moons; the ESA Huygens probe made a controlled landing on Titan on January 14, 2005.
- The Double Asteroid Redirection Test (DART) was intentionally collided with Dimorphos, a moon of the asteroid 65803 Didymos on 26 September 2022.

== Satellite collision avoidance ==
Satellite operators frequently maneuver their satellites to avoid potential collisions. One notable near collision was Sept 2019 between an ESA satellite and a SpaceX Starlink satellite, when ESA tweeted/complained at having to move to avoid the Starlink satellite.

A study from 2025, suggests that as of June 2025, if all LEO satellite operators stopped making any evasive maneuvers (e.g. due to a massive communication failure due to a massive solar storm) then a collision is likely to occur within 5.5 days. The researchers call this new metric "the CRASH Clock", and according to their calculations in January 2018 the CRASH clock was 164 days. They attribute the sharp reduction in the CRASH clock time to the launch of large satellite constellations such as Starlink.

== See also ==
- Space debris
- Meteor
- Kessler syndrome
