= Collision avoidance (spacecraft) =

Form of collision management in aeronautics

Spacecraft collision avoidance is the implementation and study of processes minimizing the chance of orbiting spacecraft inadvertently colliding with other orbiting objects. The most common subject of spacecraft collision avoidance research and development is for human-made satellites in geocentric orbits. The subject includes procedures designed to prevent the accumulation of space debris in orbit, analytical methods for predicting likely collisions, and avoidance procedures to maneuver offending spacecraft away from danger.

Orbital speed around large bodies (like the Earth) is fast, resulting in significant kinetic energy being involved in on-orbit collisions. For example, at the Low Earth orbital velocity of ~7.8 km/s, two perpendicularly colliding spacecraft would meet at ~12.2 km/s. Almost no known structurally solid materials can withstand such an energetic impact. Most of the satellite would be instantly vaporized by the collision and broken up into myriad pieces ejected at force in all directions. Because of this, any spacecraft colliding with another object in orbit is likely to be critically damaged or completely destroyed.

== Necessity ==
A cascading series of collisions between orbiting satellites and other objects could take place if a critical mass of space debris is allowed to accumulate in Earth orbit, dubbed the Kessler syndrome. More collisions would make new smaller fragments which make more collisions and so forth. The resulting positive feedback loop would create off-limits regions in orbit because of risk of collision, and eventually completely block access to space due to the risky ascent through debris-filled orbits during launch.

Very few of all satellites lofted by human-made launch vehicles that remain in Earth orbit today are still functional. As of September 2021, the ESA's Space Debris Office estimates that slightly over half of satellites in space are still operational.

Estimated quantity figures on human-launched satellites, provided by ESA's Space Debris Office
Satellites placed into Earth orbit	Still in space	Still functional
~12,070	~7,500	~4,700

While the number of satellites launched into orbit is relatively low in comparison to the amount of space available in orbit around the Earth, risky near-misses and occasional collisions happen. The 2009 satellite collision entirely obliterated both spacecraft and resulted in the creation of an estimated 1,000 new pieces of space debris larger than 10 cm (4 in) and many smaller ones.

There are other smaller bits of material in orbit around Earth that could also cause significant damage to satellites. These are relatively small objects such as micrometeoroids, remnants of satellite collisions, or small natural satellites.

Estimated quantity figures on space debris estimations, provided by ESA's Space Debris Office
Debris objects regularly tracked	Events resulting in fragmentation	Debris objects estimated to be in orbit		
Debris objects regularly tracked	Events resulting in fragmentation	>10 cm	1-10 cm	1 mm - 1 cm
~22,300	>500	>34,000	~900,000	>128 million

These objects seem innocuous, but even tiny particles like stray paint flecks can damage spacecraft. Paint flecks caused necessary window replacements after many Space Shuttle flights.

Many companies are launching large satellite constellations to provide high-speed communications and internet access from Low Earth orbit, namely SpaceX's Starlink and Amazon planned Project Kuiper constellations. Each of these systems are planned use tens of thousands of satellites, which will massively increase the total number of satellites and exacerbate space debris issues.

== Risk-mitigation methods ==
Several best practices are used to minimize the number of launched objects becoming uncontrollable space debris, varying in technique depending on the object's orbit. Most protective measures ensure that satellites and other artificial objects only remain in their operational orbits for as long as they are functional and controllable. These responsibilities fall on the satellite operator, who is bound by international agreements for how to dispose of orbiting objects.

=== Suborbital trajectories ===
Objects launched onto suborbital trajectories such as sounding rocket payloads and ballistic missile warheads do not achieve orbital velocities and fall back to earth at the end of the flight, so they do not require any intentional care on the part of the operator to ensure reentry and disposal.

The Space Shuttle external tank is designed to quickly dispose of itself after launch. The large external tank remains attached to the Space Shuttle orbiter from liftoff until when it and the orbiter are traveling at just below orbital velocity and have an altitude of approximately 113 km (70 mi), at which point it detaches and follows a ballistic trajectory quickly reentering the atmosphere. Most of the external tank disintegrates due to the heat of reentry, while the orbiter uses reaction control thrusters to complete its orbital insertion.

=== Low Earth orbit ===
The vast majority of artificial satellites and space stations orbit in Low Earth orbits (LEO), with mean altitudes lower than 2000 km (1200 mi). LEO satellites are close to the thicker parts of the atmosphere where safe reentry is practical because the Delta-v required to decelerate from LEO is small. Most LEO satellites use the last of their remaining onboard station-keeping fuel (used to maintain the satellite's orbit against forces like atmospheric drag that gradually perturb the orbit) to execute de-orbit burns and dispose of themselves.

The ease of access for de-orbiting LEO satellites at end of life makes it a successful method for controlling the space debris risk in LEO.

=== Medium Earth orbit and higher ===
Orbits with mean altitudes higher than LEO (such as Medium Earth orbits (MEO), Geosynchronous orbit/Geostationary orbit (GSO/GEO), and other species) are far from the denser parts of the atmosphere, making full de-orbit burns significantly more impractical. Few satellite designs have sufficient fuel margins to be able to afford such a maneuver at the end of their lives.

Satellites at altitudes towards the lower bound of MEO can use the "25-year rule" to decelerate with onboard propulsion so that it will fall out of orbit within 25 years, but this provision is only allowed if satellite operators can prove by statistical analysis that there is less than a 1/10,000 chance that the atmospheric reentry will cause human injury or property damage. Satellites disposed of in this fashion reenter the atmosphere in an area of the South Pacific Ocean far from inhabited areas called the spacecraft cemetery.

==== Graveyard orbits ====
Spacecraft orbiting at higher altitudes between LEO and High Earth orbit (HEO), most commonly in the highly specific and crowded GSO/GEO, are too far to make use of the "25-year rule". GSO and GEO require that the orbital plane be almost perfectly equatorial and the altitude be as close to a perfectly circular 35,786 km (22,236 mi), which means that space is limited and satellites cannot be allowed to stay past their useful life. Instead of decelerating for reentry, most satellites at these altitudes accelerate slightly into higher graveyard orbits where they will forever remain out of the way of interaction with operational satellites.

=== Empty rocket stages remaining in orbit ===
Historically, many multi-stage launcher designs completely expended their fuel to achieve orbit and left their spent rocket stages in orbit, as in the former Soviet Zenit family of rockets. These upper stages are large artificial satellites, which depending on the orbit can take many years to reenter.

Most modern designs include sufficient fuel margins for de-orbit burns after injecting payload into orbit. SpaceX's Falcon 9 is a launch vehicle designed to minimize the effect of its upper stage on space debris. The rocket is composed of two stages, the first of which is suborbital. It reenters within minutes of launch, either intentionally using fuel reserved for stage recovery to land for reuse or is left to continue on its ballistic trajectory and disintegrate upon reentry into the atmosphere.

Falcon 9 second stages are dealt with using different techniques depending on the orbit. For Low Earth orbits, the second stage uses remaining fuel to perform a de-orbit burn and disintegrate in the atmosphere. Stages stranded in Medium Earth orbits, like Geostationary transfer orbits (GTO) and Geostationary orbit (GEO), generally don't have sufficient fuel to de-orbit themselves. GTO trajectories are designed such that the second stage's orbit will naturally decay and reenter the atmosphere after a few months, while stages from missions targeting direct insertion into GEO will remain for a lot longer.

== Collision prediction methods ==
Most impact risk predictions are calculated using databases of orbiting objects with orbit parameters like position and velocity measured by ground-based observations. The United States Department of Defense Space Surveillance Network maintains a catalog of all known orbiting objects approximately equal to a softball in size or larger. Information on smaller articles of space debris is less accurate or unknown.

Once the exact orbit of an object is accurately known, the DoD's SSN publishes known parameters for public analysis on the DoD's space-track.org and NASA's Space Science Data Coordinated Archive. The object's orbit can then be projected into the future, estimating where it will be located and the chance it will have a close encounter with another orbiting object. Long-term orbit projections have large error bars due to complicated gravitational effects that gradually perturb the orbit (akin to those of the Three-body problem) and the measurement errors of ground tracking equipment. For these reasons, methods for more precise measurement and estimation are an active field of research.

NASA conducts orbital projections and assesses collision risk for known objects larger than 4 inches (10 cm). For critical assets like the International Space Station, evaluations are made for the risk that any object will traverse within a rectangular region half a mile (1.25 km) above/below and 15 miles (25 km) ahead/behind in orbit and to either side of the spacecraft. This high-risk zone is known as the “pizza box" because of the shape it resembles.

== Collision avoidance methods ==
Current avoidance techniques rely on slightly changing the orbit to minimize collision risk and then returning the spacecraft to its previous orbit after the risk event has passed. The exact method used to make orbital adjustments differs based on what controls are available on the spacecraft. Collision avoidance maneuvers are sometimes also called Debris Avoidance Maneuvers (DAMs) when the offending object is an article of space debris.

=== Spacecraft with onboard propulsion ===
NASA uses avoidance maneuvers if the collision risk is identified sufficiently in advance and the risk is high. NASA policy for crewed spacecraft, which all have onboard propulsion, like the Space Shuttle and the International Space Station (agreed upon by all international partners) requires planning for avoidance maneuvers if the probability of collision is

- >1/100,000 and the maneuver wouldn't conflict with mission objectives
- >1/10,000 and the maneuver wouldn't further endanger the crew

As of August 2020, the ISS has conducted 27 collision avoidance maneuvers since its initial launch in 1999 and is trending upwards with time. The class of debris most dangerous to the US Orbital Segment are those between 1-10 cm. The population of debris in this size range is significant and difficult to track accurately with current methods, meriting further research.

These avoidance maneuvers are almost always conducted by the firing of onboard Reaction control thrusters, although some other satellite and spacecraft orientation systems like Magnetorquers, Reaction wheels, and Control moment gyroscopes may be involved. The ISS can also use the main engines of a docked cargo spacecraft – usually a Progress spacecraft or Automated Transfer Vehicle. The maneuvers slightly change the orbital trajectory and are usually conducted hours before the risk event to allow the effects of the orbital change to take effect.

When two satellite operators are notified of a potential collision, one or both operators may decide to maneuver their satellite, eg. ESA & SpaceX in 2019.

Recent research has developed algorithms to aid collision avoidance efforts within large satellite constellations, although it is unknown whether such research has been implemented in any active constellation GNC.

==== Docking aborts ====
Another use of a collision avoidance maneuver is to abort an automated docking, and such a procedure is built into the software that controls the docking of Automated Transfer Vehicles to the ISS. This can be initiated by the crew aboard the space station, as an emergency override, in the event of a problem during the docking. This maneuver was demonstrated shortly after the launch of the first ATV, Jules Verne, and subsequently during demonstration approaches to the station which it conducted in late March 2008.

=== Spacecraft without onboard propulsion ===
Most human-launched satellites without onboard propulsion are small CubeSats which rely on alternative devices for orientation control. At the scale of small objects like CubeSats, forces related to the large relative surface area in proportion to mass become significant. CubeSats are often launched into Low Earth orbit, where the atmosphere still provides a small amount of aerodynamic drag.

The aerodynamic drag on small satellites in Low Earth orbit can be used to change orbits slightly to avoid debris collisions by changing the surface area exposed to atmospheric drag, alternating between low-drag and high-drag configurations to control deceleration.

=== Complicating factors ===
Attempts to alleviate potential collisions are complicated by factors including if

- at least one of the offending objects lacks remote control capability due to being defunct
- at least one of the offending objects is a natural satellite, like an asteroid
- the risk event isn't predicted with sufficient time to act

All these occurrences limit strategic options for collision risk reduction in different ways. Very little can prevent the projected collision if both objects don't have control capabilities. If only one of the objects is an operational satellite, it would be the sole contributor to an avoidance maneuver, significantly cutting into or entirely using up remaining fuel reserves. The satellite may also have insufficient fuel to complete the maneuver properly, reducing its effectiveness.

Collision avoidance maneuvers require significant planning and execution time, which can be an issue if the risk isn't predicted sufficiently in advance. Spacecraft propulsion is often weak, relying on long burns to change their orbits, and the velocity change often requires a meaningful fraction of a complete orbit to produce the required effect.

For example, maneuvers commonly conducted by the International Space Station to avoid collisions often require roughly 150 second burns and significant disturbances to crew operations because of the mandatory slow reconfiguration of the station's solar panels to avoid damage by propulsion devices. Roughly speaking, the estimated quickest reaction time of the ISS from normal operation is about 5 hours and 20 minutes to account for the ~3 hour setup period of station reconfiguration and the ~2 hours of post-burn lead time to allow the velocity change to take effect.

=== Effects on launch windows ===
Collision avoidance is a concern during spaceflight launch windows. Typically, a Collision On Launch Assessment (COLA) needs to be performed and approved before launching a satellite. A launch window is said to have a COLA blackout period during intervals when the vehicle cannot lift off to ensure its trajectory does not take it too close to another object already in space.

== See also ==
- Space debris
- Collision avoidance
- Space traffic management
