= List of space debris producing events =

Major contributors to space debris include the explosion of upper stages and satellite collisions.

== Overview ==
There were 190 known satellite breakups between 1961 and 2006. By 2015, the total had grown to 250 on-orbit fragmentation events.

As of 2012 there were an estimated 500,000 pieces of debris in orbit, with 300,000 pieces below 2000 km (LEO). Of the total, about 20,000 are tracked. Also, about sixteen old Soviet nuclear space reactors are known to have released an estimated 100,000 NaK liquid metal coolant droplets 800–900 km up, which range in size from 1–6 cm.

The greatest risk to space missions is from untracked debris between 1 and 10 cm in size. Large pieces can be tracked and avoided, and impact from smaller pieces are usually survivable.

== Top debris creation events ==
Top debris creation events, August 2024
Object	Year	Pieces	Notes
Fengyun-1C	2007	3,549	Intentional collision (ASAT)
Kosmos 2251	2009	1,716	Accidental collision with Iridium 33
Kosmos 1408	2021	1,562	Intentional collision (ASAT)
Long March 6A upper stage	2024	700–900+	Unknown; but may be related to upper stage passivization or insulation.
Long March 6A upper stage	2022	781	Unknown; but may be related to upper stage passivization or insulation with later debris cloud expansion.
STEP 2 Rocket Body	1996	756	Residual propellant explosion
Iridium 33	2009	659	Accidental collision with Kosmos 2251
Kosmos 2421	2008	511	Disintegrated
SPOT 1 Rocket Body	1986	506	Residual propellant explosion
Parus	1981	482	Battery explosion
OV2-1 Rocket Body	1965	473	Engine explosion
Nimbus 4 Rocket Body	1970	465	Residual propellant explosion
NOAA-16	2015	458	Battery explosion
TES Rocket Body	2001	373	Residual propellant explosion
CBERS-1 Rocket Body	2000	344	Residual propellant explosion
Fregat tank	2020	338	Residual propellant explosion
Ablestar	1961	320	Residual propellant explosion
Delta 2910	1975	313	Residual propellant explosion
Solwind	1985	289	Intentional collision (ASAT)

== Recent events ==
Date	Object	International Designation	Cause	Total Pieces	Pieces in Orbit	Reentered Pieces as of Dec 2022 (Note: The date when all rows were updated.)
August 31, 2018	Centaur V upper stage	2014-055B	Unknown	107	107	0
December 22, 2018	ORBCOMM FM-16	1998-046E	Energetic fragmentation; Probably caused by left over propellent	13	5	8
January 24, 2019	Microsat-R	2019-006A	ASAT (Anti-Satellite) weapon system test	129	0	129
February 6, 2019	H2-A 202 Rocket Body	2018-084L	Unknown; Third known breakup of an H-2A Rocket Body	6	0	6
February 6, 2019	H2-A 202 Payload Adapter	2018-084E	Energetic fragmentation event; Cause Unknown	3	0	3
April 2019	Centaur V Rocket Body	2018-079B	Energetic fragmentation event; Cause Unknown	193	192	1
May 7, 2019	Titan IIIC Transtage rocket body	1976-023F	Energetic fragmentation event by caused the overheating of leftover anhydrous hydrazine(N2H4) Mono Propellant	? (Note: No fragments have entered the SSN catalog as 2022-09-22)	?	?
August 19, 2019	SOZ (Sistema Obespecheniya Zapuska) ullage motor from a Proton Block DM fourth stage	2010-041H	Energetic fragmentation event; caused by left over fuel in the ullage motor. 30th fragmentation event of a SOZ unit. 34 intact units remain in orbit	23	23	0
August 13, 2019	Ariane 42P third stage rocket body	1992-052D	Unknown	10	10	0
December 23, 2019	Kosmos 2491	2013-076E	Unknown	~20	~20	0
May 8, 2020	Fregat tank	2011-037B	Unknown, possibly explosion	346	280	66
July 12, 2020	H2-A 202 Fairing	2018-084C	Collision with untracked debris	123	5	118
March 18, 2021	Yunhai-1 02	2019-063A	Accidental collision with a fragment from the Zenit-2 rocket body that launched Tselina-2 in 1996.	39	20	19
November 15, 2021	Kosmos 1408	1982-092A	ASAT (Anti-Satellite) weapon system test	1787	394	1393
November 12, 2022	Long March 6A upper stage	2022-151B	Unknown; but may be related to upper stage passivization or insulation.	781	722	59
November 17, 2022	H2-A 202 Payload fairing	2012-025F	Energetic fragmentation event; Cause unknown	50+	50+	0
January 4, 2023	Kosmos 2499	2014-028E	Unknown	85	85	0
March 11, 2023	Orbcomm F36	1999-065E	Unknown; likely energetic fragmentation event caused by a malfunction in the hydrazine orbit adjust system	7	7	0
August 21, 2023	Vega VV02 VESPA adapter	2013-021D	Unknown; likely debris impact	7	7	0
June 26, 2024	Resurs-P No.1	2013-030A	Unknown; but may be related to improper spacecraft passivization	100	19	?
July 4, 2024	Long March 6A upper stage	2024-126C	Unknown; but may be related to upper stage passivization or insulation.	44	0	?
August 6, 2024	Long March 6A upper stage	2024-140U	Unknown; but may be related to upper stage passivization or insulation.	700+	663	?
September 6, 2024	Atlas V Centaur upper stage	2018-022B	Unknown;	843+	843	?
October 19, 2024	Intelsat 33e	2016-053B	Unknown; potential threat to all spacecraft in geostationary orbit, including the Russian satellites, Ekspress-AT1, Yamal-402, Ekspress-AM6 and Elektro-L;	1104+	1104	?
February 9, 2025	New Glenn upper stage+Blue Ring	2025-011A	Energetic fragmentation event; Cause Unknown; but may be related to upper stage passivization or insulation.	67	67	0
