= Human presence in space =

Physical presence of human activity in outer space

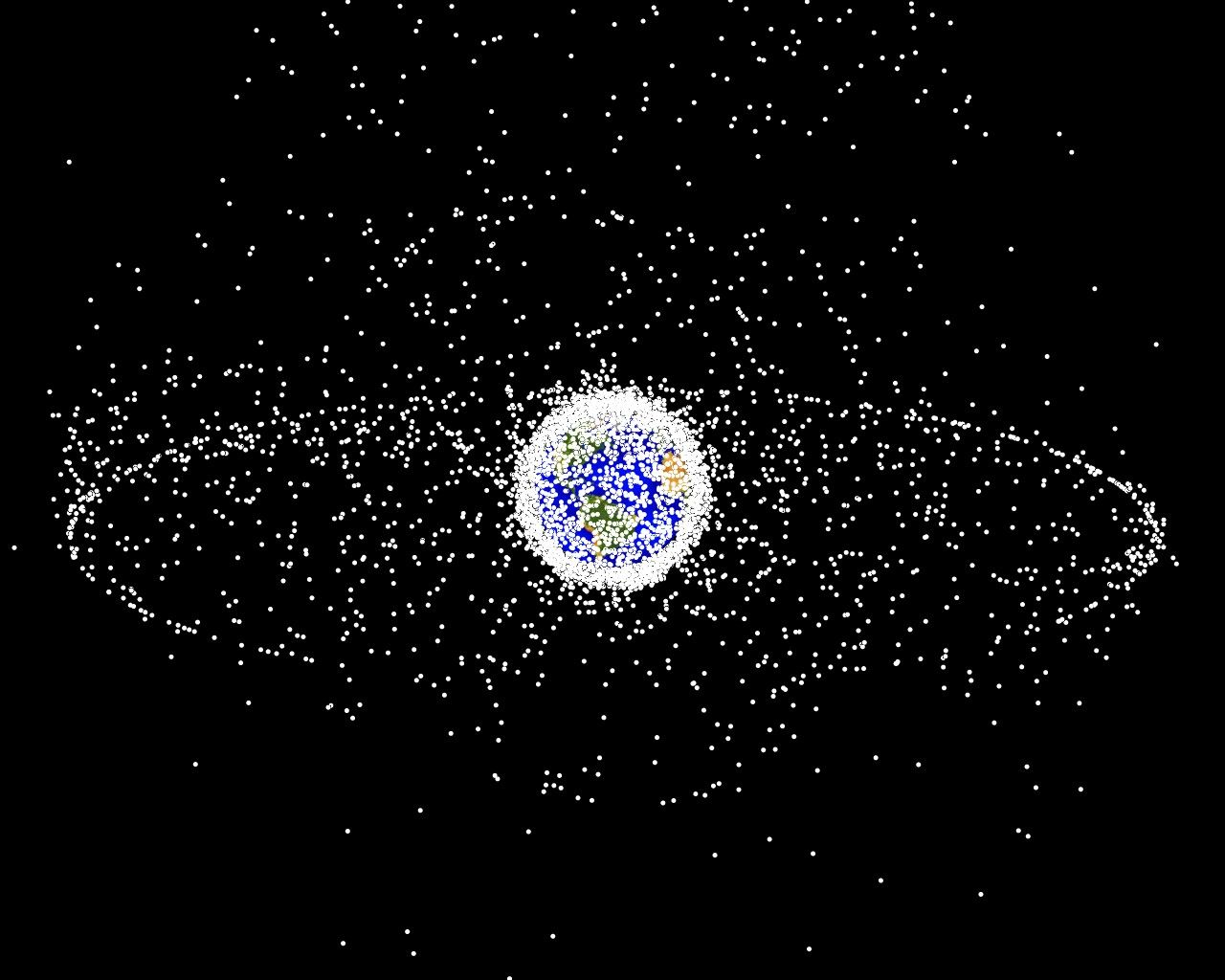
A computer-generated image mapping the prevalence of artificial satellites and space debris around Earth in geosynchronous and low Earth orbit

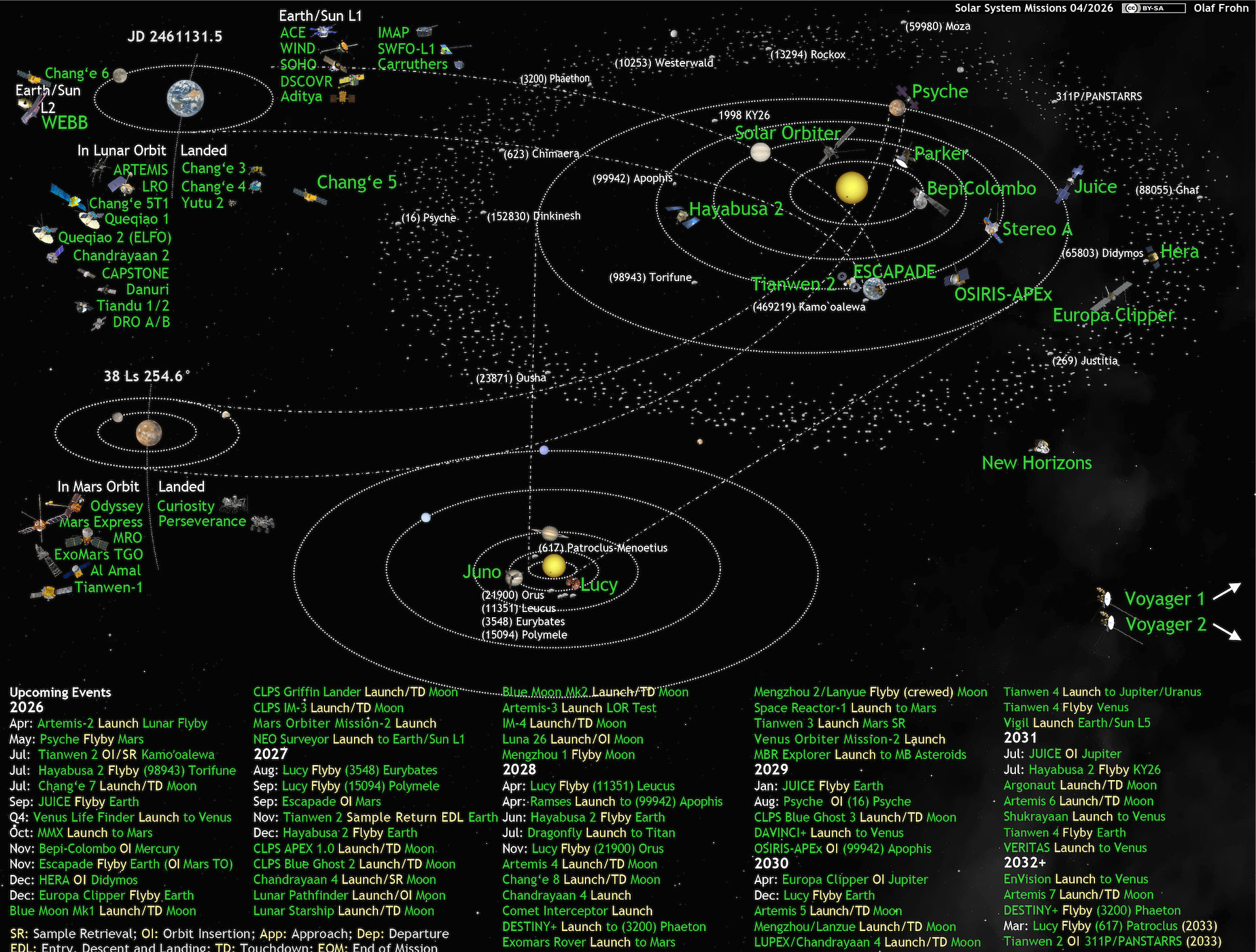
All active Solar System space probes in 2026 (and a list of upcoming ones)

Human presence in space (also anthropogenic presence in space or humanity in space) is the direct and mediated presence or telepresence of humans in outer space, and in an extended sense across space including astronomical objects. Human presence in space, particularly through mediation, can take many forms from space debris, uncrewed spacecraft, artificial satellites, space observatories, crewed spacecraft, art in space, to human outposts in outer space such as space stations.

While human presence in space, particularly its continuation and permanence can be a goal in itself, human presence can have a range of purposes and modes from space exploration, commercial use of space to extraterrestrial settlement or even space colonization and militarisation of space. Human presence in space is realized and sustained through the advancement and application of space sciences, particularly astronautics in the form of spaceflight and space infrastructure.

Humans have achieved some mediated presence throughout the Solar System, but the most extensive presence has been in orbit around Earth. Humankind reached outer space mediated in 1944 (MW 18014) and have sustained mediated presence since 1958 (Vanguard 1), as well as having reached space directly for the first time on 12 April 1961 (Yuri Gagarin) and since the late 1980s with some few interruptions through crewing, the space station Mir beginning to spend extended periods in space and continuously from the year 2000 with the crewed International Space Station (ISS). In the future, humanity is expected to achieve the goal of a long-term presence on the Moon in the 2030s.

The increasing and extensive human presence in orbital space around Earth, beside its benefits, has also produced a threat to it by carrying with it space debris, potentially cascading into the so-called Kessler syndrome. This has raised the need for regulation and mitigation of such to secure a sustainable access to outer space.

Securing the access to space and human presence in space has been pursued and allowed by the establishment of space law and space industry, creating a space infrastructure. But sustainability has remained a challenging goal, with the United Nations seeing the need to advance long-term sustainability of outer space activities in space science and application, and the United States having it as a crucial goal of its contemporary space policy and space program.

== Terminology ==
For outer space being the dominant expanse of space, "space" is often used synonymously for outer space, referring to human presence in space to human presence across all of space, including astronomical bodies which outer space surrounds.

The United States has been using the term "human presence" to identify one of the long-term goals of its space program and its international cooperation. While it traditionally means and is used to name direct human presence, it is also used for mediated presence. Differentiating human presence in space between direct and mediated human presence, meaning human or non-human presence, such as with crewed or uncrewed spacecraft, is rooted in a history of how human presence is to be understood (see dedicated chapter).

Human, particularly direct, presence in space is sometimes replaced with "boots on the ground" or equated with space colonization. But such terms, particularly colonization and even settlement has been avoided and questioned to describe human presence in space, since they employ very particular concepts of appropriation, with historic baggage, addressing the forms of human presence in a particular and not general way.

Alternatively some have used the term "humanization of space", which differs in focusing on the general development, impact and structure of human presence in space.

On an international level the United Nations uses the phrase of "outer space activity" for the activity of its member states in space.

== History ==
Human presence in outer space began with the first launches of artificial object in the mid 20th century, and has increased to the point where Earth is orbited by a vast number of artificial objects and the far reaches of the Solar System have been visited and explored by a range of space probes. Human presence throughout the Solar System is continued by different contemporary and future missions, most of them mediating human presence through robotic spaceflight.

From the initial Soviet achievements, which ushered in United States-Soviet competition, human space exploration has evolved into a global and commercial frontier.

== Representation, participation and regulation ==
Objects launched into space cumulatively by country

Orbital space travelers by country of origin (as of August 17th, 2024)

The participation and representation of all humanity in space is an ongoing issue of human access to (and presence in) space ever since the beginning of spaceflight. Different space agencies, space programs and interest groups such as the International Astronomical Union have been formed supporting or producing humanity's or a particular human presence in space. Representation has been shaped by the inclusiveness, scope and varying capabilities of these organizations and programs.

Some rights of non-spacefaring countries to partake in spaceflight have been secured through international space law, declaring space the "province of all mankind", understanding spaceflight as its resource, though sharing of space for all humanity is still criticized as imperialist and lacking, particularly regarding regulation of private spceflight.

Additionally to international inclusion the inclusion of women, people of colour and with disability has also been lacking. To reach a more inclusive spaceflight some organizations like the Justspace Alliance and IAU featured Inclusive Astronomy have been formed in recent years.

=== Law and governance ===

Member States of the United Nations Committee on the Peaceful Uses of Outer Space (COPUOS) and logo of its secretariate United Nations Office for Outer Space Affairs (UNOOSA)

Space activity is legally based on the Outer Space Treaty, the main international treaty. Though there are other international agreements such as the significantly less ratified Moon Treaty.

The Outer Space Treaty established the basic ramifications for space activity in article one: "The exploration and use of outer space, including the Moon and other celestial bodies, shall be carried out for the benefit and in the interests of all countries, irrespective of their degree of economic or scientific development, and shall be the province of all mankind."

And continued in article two by stating: "Outer space, including the Moon and other celestial bodies, is not subject to national appropriation by claim of sovereignty, by means of use or occupation, or by any other means."

The development of international space law has revolved much around outer space being defined as common heritage of mankind. The Magna Carta of Space presented by William A. Hyman in 1966 framed outer space explicitly not as terra nullius but as res communis, which subsequently influenced the work of the United Nations Committee on the Peaceful Uses of Outer Space (COPUOS).

The United Nations Office for Outer Space Affairs and the International Telecommunication Union are international organizations central for facilitating space regulation, such as space traffic management.

== Forms ==
=== Signals and radiation ===
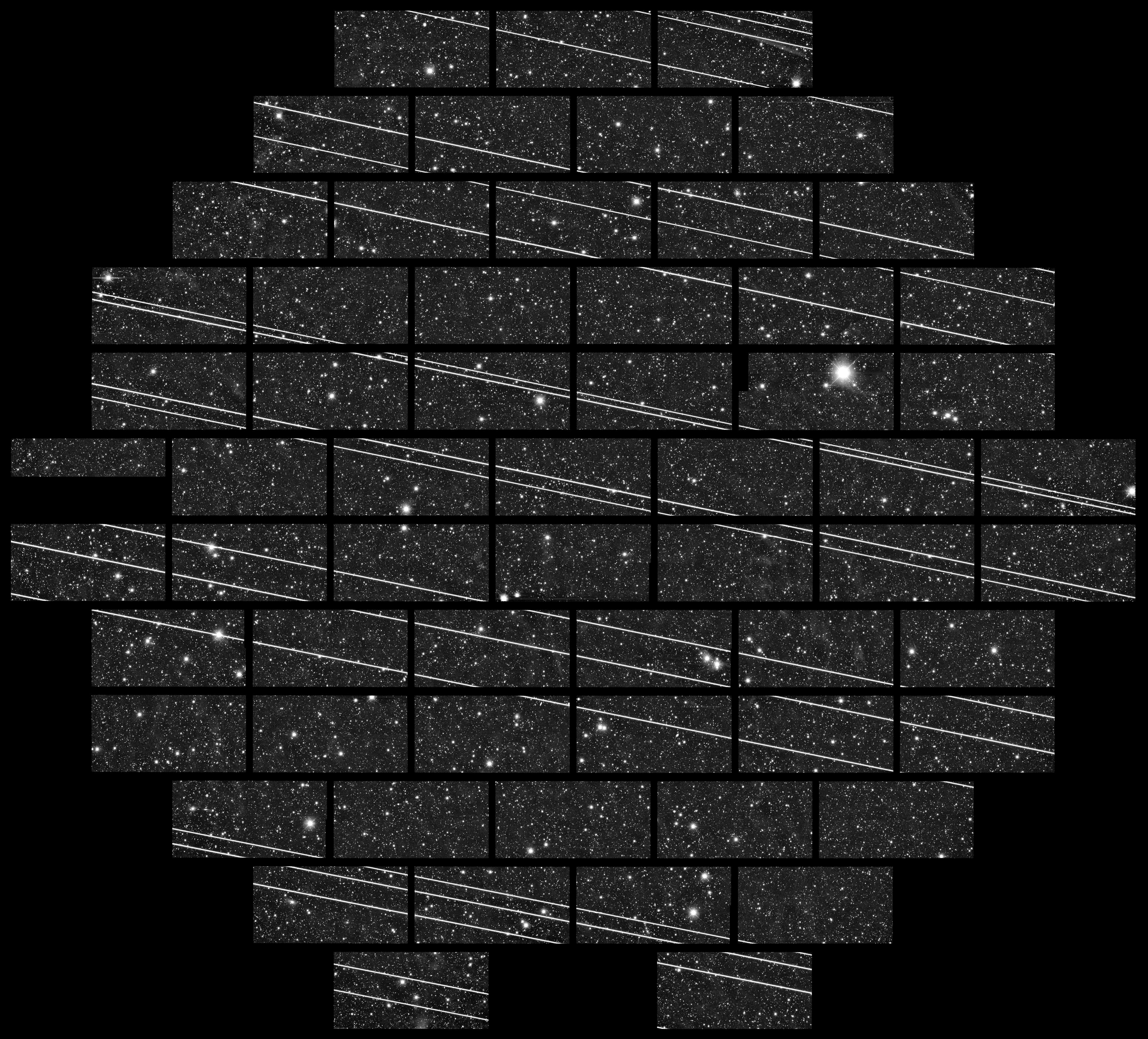
333 seconds-exposure image of the night sky containing 19 or more streaks due to Starlink satellite's satellite flare light pollution

Humans have been producing a range of radiation which has reached space unintentionally as well as intentionally, well before any direct human presence in space. Electromagnetic radiation such as light, of humans, has been reaching even stars as far away as the age of the radiation.

Beginning in the 20th century, humans have been sending radiation significantly into space. Nuclear explosions, especially high-altitude ones have since at times, starting with 1958, just a year after the first satellite Sputnik was launched, introduced strong and broad radiation from humans into space, producing electromagnetic pulses and orbital radiation belts, adding to the explosion's destructive potential on ground and in orbit.

While Earth's and humanities radiation profile is the main material for space based remote Earth observation, but radiation by human activity from Earth and from space has also been an obstacle for human activities, such as spiritual life or astronomy through light pollution and radio spectrum pollution from Earth and space. In the case of radio astronomy radio quiet zones have been kept and sought out, with the far side of the Moon being most pristine facing away from human made electromagnetic interference.

=== Space junk and human impact ===
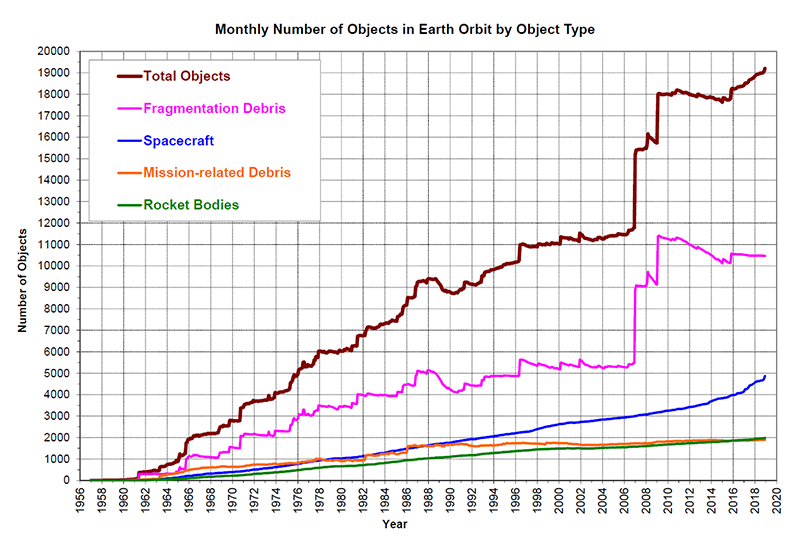
Objects in Earth orbit including fragmentation debris. November 2020 NASA:ODPO

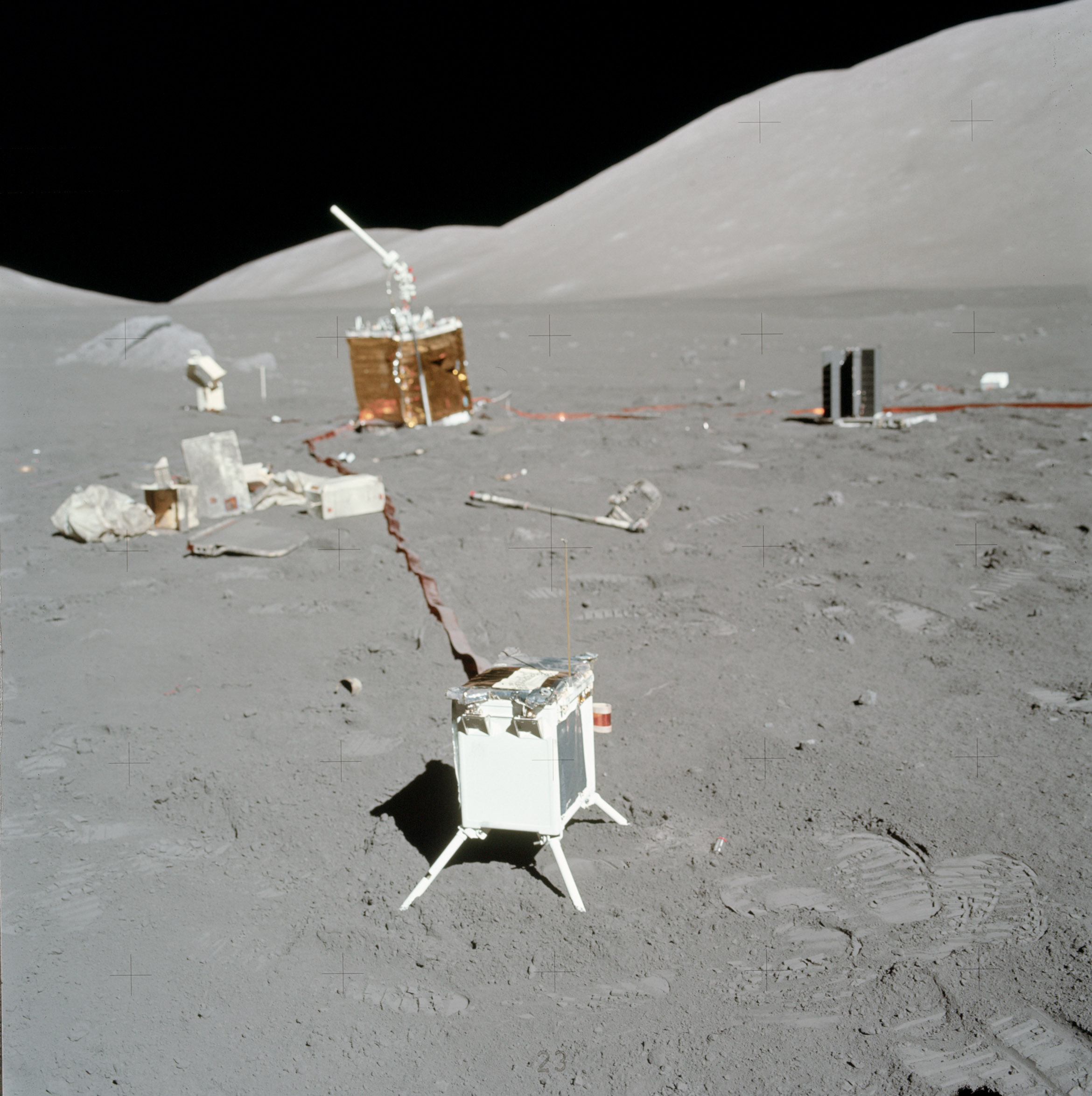
Remains of human activity, Apollo 17's Lunar Surface Experiments Package

Space junk as product and form of human presence in space has existed ever since the first orbital spaceflights and comes mostly in the form of space debris in outer space. Space debris for example was ejected in 1957 purposefully from an Aerobee launch system in a likely failed attempt to reach for the first time escape velocity from Earth, and therefore space beyond Earth. Most space debris is in orbit around Earth, it can stay there for years to centuries if at altitudes from hundreds to thousands of kilometers, before it falls to Earth. Space debris is a hazard since it can hit and damage spacecraft. Having reached considerable amounts around Earth, policies have been put into place to prevent space debris and hazards, such as international regulation to prevent nuclear hazards in Earth's orbit and the Registration Convention as part of space traffic management.

But space junk can also come as result of human activity on astronomical bodies, such as the remains of space missions, like the many artificial objects left behind on the Moon, and on other bodies.

| Surface | Total estimated mass of objects (kg) | Total estimated local weight of objects (N) |
|---|---|---|
| Churyumov–Gerasimenko | 100 | ? |
| Eros | 487 | ? |
| Itokawa | 0.591 | ? |
| Jupiter | 2,564 | 59,400 |
| Mars | 10,240 | 37,833 |
| Mercury | 507.9 | 1,881 |
| The Moon | 218,829 | 36,181 |
| Ryugu | 18.5 | ? |
| Saturn | 2,150 | 2,289.75 |
| Tempel 1 | 370 | 2.5 |
| Titan | 319 | 372 |
| Venus | 22,642 | 201,256 |
| Dimorphos | 570 | ? |
| Total | 259,073 | 613,725+ |

=== Robotic ===
Human presence in space has been strongly based on the many robotic spacecraft, particularly as the many artificial satellites in orbit around Earth.

Many firsts of human presence in space have been achieved by robotic missions. The first artificial object to reach space, above the 100 km altitude Kármán line, and therefore performing the first sub-orbital flight was MW 18014 in 1944. But the first sustained presence in space was established by the orbital flight of Sputnik in 1957. Followed by a rich number of robotic space probes achieving human presence and exploration throughout the Solar System for the first time.

Human presence at the Moon was established by the Luna programme starting in 1959, with a first flyby and heliocentric orbit (Luna 1), a first arrival of an artificial object on the surface with an impactor (Luna 2), and the first pictures of the far side of the Moon (Luna 3). The Moon then was in 1966 visited for the first time by a lander (Luna 9), as well as an orbiter (Luna 10), and in 1970 for the first time a rover (Lunokhod 1) landed on an extraterrestrial body. Interplanetary presence was established at Venus by the Venera program, with a flyby in 1961 (Venera 1) and a crash in 1966 (Venera 3).

Presence in the outer Solar System was achieved by Pioneer 10 in 1972 and presence in interstellar space by Voyager 1 in 2012.

The 1958 Vanguard 1 is the fourth artificial satellite and the oldest spacecraft still in space and orbit around Earth, though inactive.

=== Presence of non-human life from Earth ===
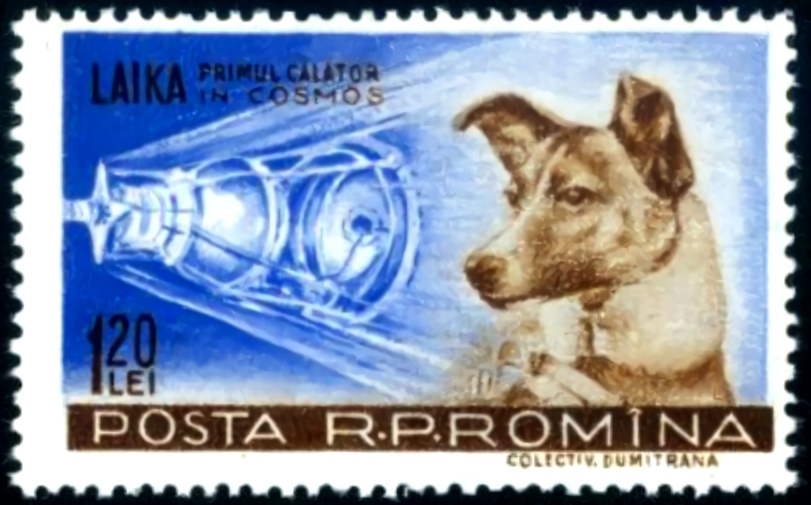
Laika was sent into space in 1957, without plans for survival on return, becoming the first animal (including humans) to reach orbit. Here in her flight harness on a Romanian stamp from 1959.

Since the very beginning of human outer space activities in 1944, and possibly before that, life has been present with microscopic life as space contaminate and after 1960 as space research subjects. Prior to crewed spaceflight non-human animals had been subjects of space research, specifically bioastronautics and astrobiology, being exposed to ever higher testflights. The first animals (including humans) and plant seeds in space above the 100 km Kármán line were corn seeds and fruit flies, launched for the first time on 9 July 1946, with the first fruit flies launched and returned alive in 1947. In 1949 Albert II, became the first mammal and first primate reaching the 100 km Kármán line, and in 1957 the dog Laika became the first animal in orbit, with both also becoming the first fatalities of spaceflight and in space, respectively. In 1968, on Zond 5 Russian tortoises, worms, flies and seeds became the first multicelular life from Earth to be flown to, as well as returned safely from, deep space. In 2019 Chang'e 4 landed fruit flies on the Moon, the first extraterrestrial stay of non-human animals.

Visits of organisms to extraterrestrial bodies have been a significant issue of planetary protection, as with the crash of tardigrades on the Moon in 2019.

Plants first grown in 1966 with Kosmos 110 and in 1971 on Salyut 1, with the first producing seeds August 4, 1982 on Salyut 7. The first plant to sprout on the Moon and any extraterrestrial body grew in 2019, on the Chang'e 4 lander.

Plants and growing them in space and places such as the Moon have been important subjects of space research, but also as psychological support and possibly nutrition during continuous crewed presence in space.

=== Direct human presence in space ===
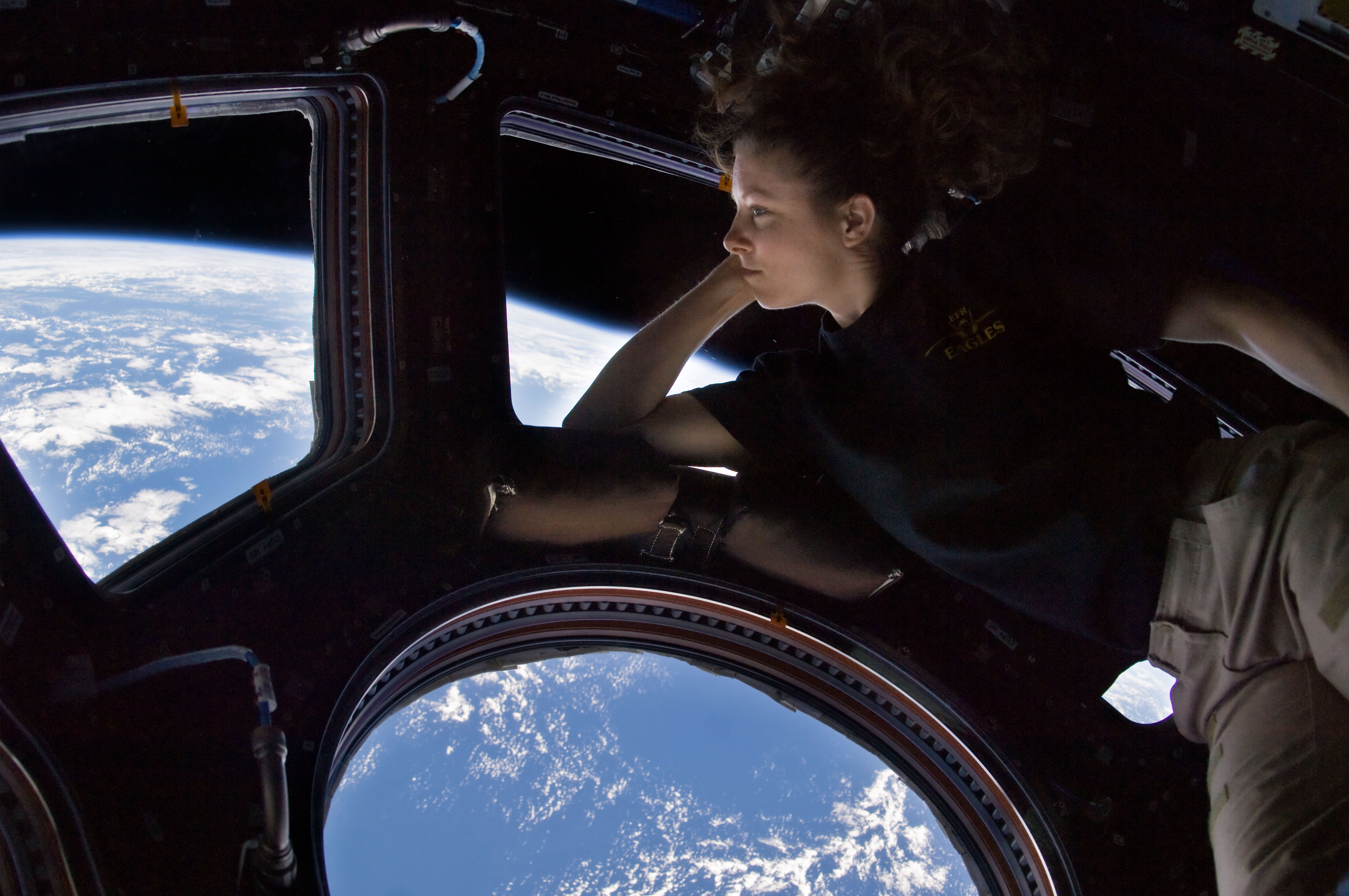
International Space Station crewmember Tracy Caldwell Dyson views the Earth, 2010.

Direct human presence in space was achieved with Yuri Gagarin flying a space capsule in 1961 for one orbit around Earth for the first time. While direct human presence in open space, by exiting a spacecraft in a spacesuit, a so-called extravehicular activity, has been achieved since the first person to do so, Alexei Leonov, in 1965.

Though Valentina Tereshkova was in 1963 the first woman in space, women saw no further presence in space until the 1980s and are still underrepresented, e.g. with no women ever present on the Moon. Only one woman, Artemis II astronaut Christina Koch, has left low Earth orbit, flying around the Moon. Artemis IV plans to send the first woman to lunar orbit and the lunar surface. An internationalization of direct human presence in space started with the first space rendezvous of two crews of different human spaceflight programs, the Apollo–Soyuz mission in 1975 and at the end of the 1970s with the Interkosmos program.

Space stations have harboured so far the only long-duration direct human presence in space. After the first station Salyut 1 (1971) and its tragic Soyuz 11 crew, space stations have been operated consecutively since Skylab (1973), having allowed a progression of long-duration direct human presence in space. Long-duration direct human presence has been joined by visiting crews since 1977 (Salyut 6). Consecutive direct human presence in space has been achieved since the Salyut successor Mir starting with 1987. This was continued until the operational transition from the Mir to the ISS, giving rise with its first occupation to an uninterrupted direct human presence in space since 2000. While human population records in orbit developed from 1 in 1961, 2 in 1962, 3 in 1964, 4 in 1965, 5 and 7 in 1969, 8 and 11 in 1984, 12 in 1990 and 13 in 1995, to 14 in 2021, 17 in 2023 and 19 in 2024, developing into a continuous population of no less than 10 people on two space stations since 5 June 2022 (as of 2024). The ISS has hosted the most people in space at the same time, reaching 13 for the first time during the eleven day docking of STS-127 in 2009.

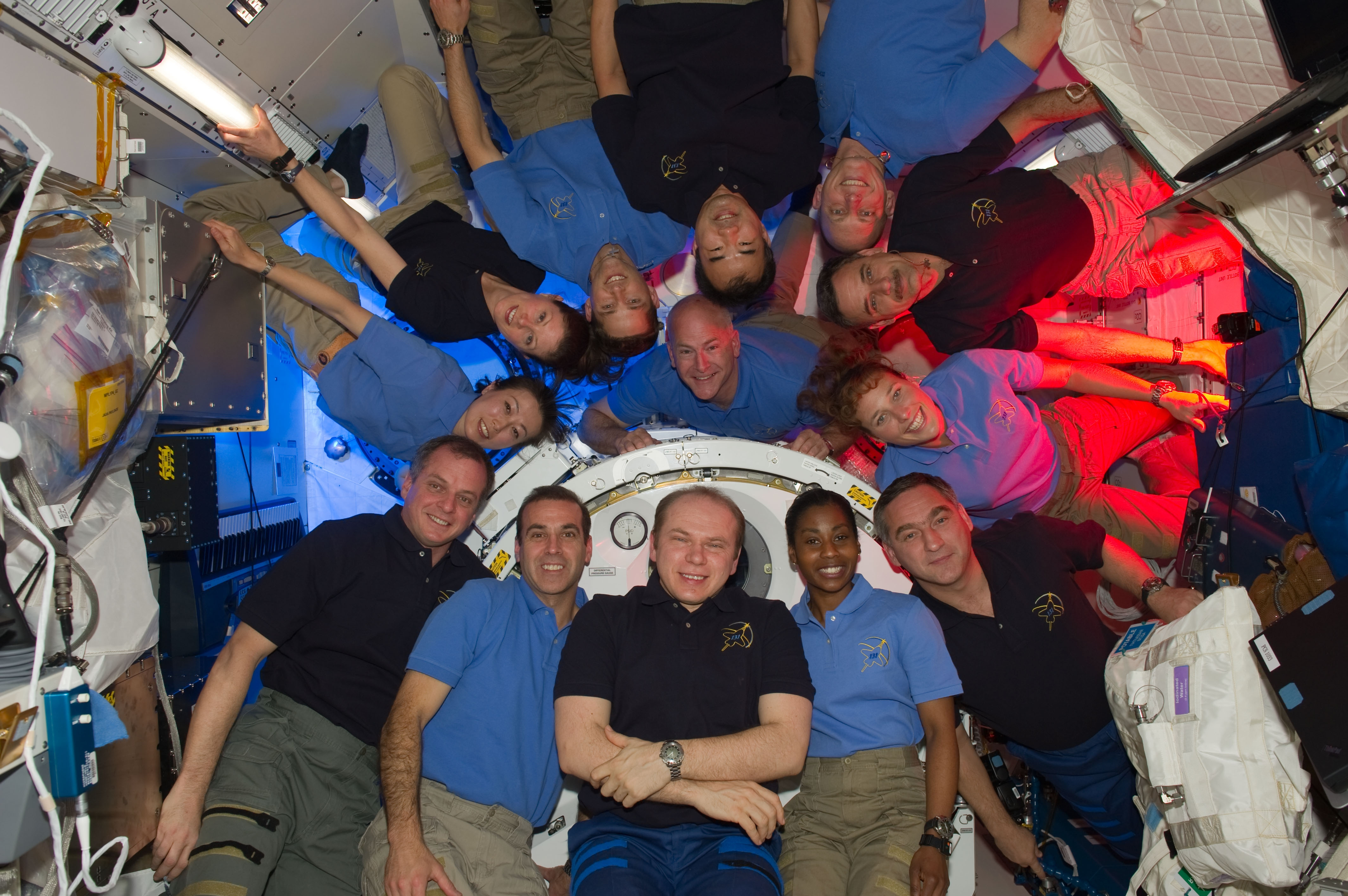
STS-131 and Expedition 23 crew members gather for a group portrait of 13 in 2010, which set the record of four women at the same time in space.

Beyond Earth the Moon has been the only astronomical object which so far has seen direct human presence through the Apollo missions between 1968 and 1972, beginning with the first orbit by Apollo 8 in 1968 and with the first landing by Apollo 11 in 1969. The longest, and most recent, extraterrestrial human stay was three days by Apollo 17 in 1972.

While most persons who have been to space are astronauts, professional members of human spaceflight programs, particularly governmental ones, the few others, starting in the 1980s, have been trained and gone to space as spaceflight participants, with the first space tourist staying in space in 2001.

By the end of the 2010s several hundred people from more than 40 countries have gone into space, most of them reaching orbit. Twenty-eight people (24 Apollo astronauts and the four Artemis II astronauts, the most at the same time) have entered deep space, all of them reaching the Moon's vicinity, and 12 of them have walked on the Moon. Space travelers have spent by 2007 over 29,000 person-days (or a cumulative total of over 77 years) in space including over 100 person-days of spacewalks. Usual durations for individuals to inhabit space on long-duration stays are six months, with the longest stays on record being at about a year.

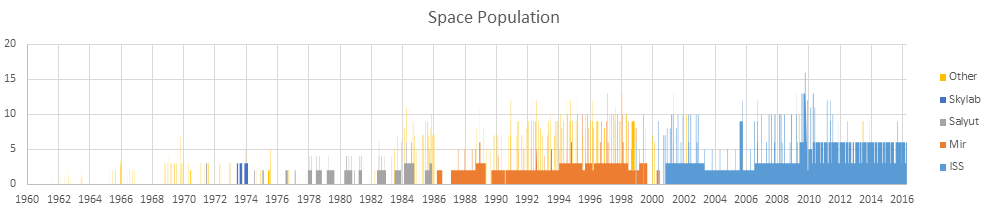

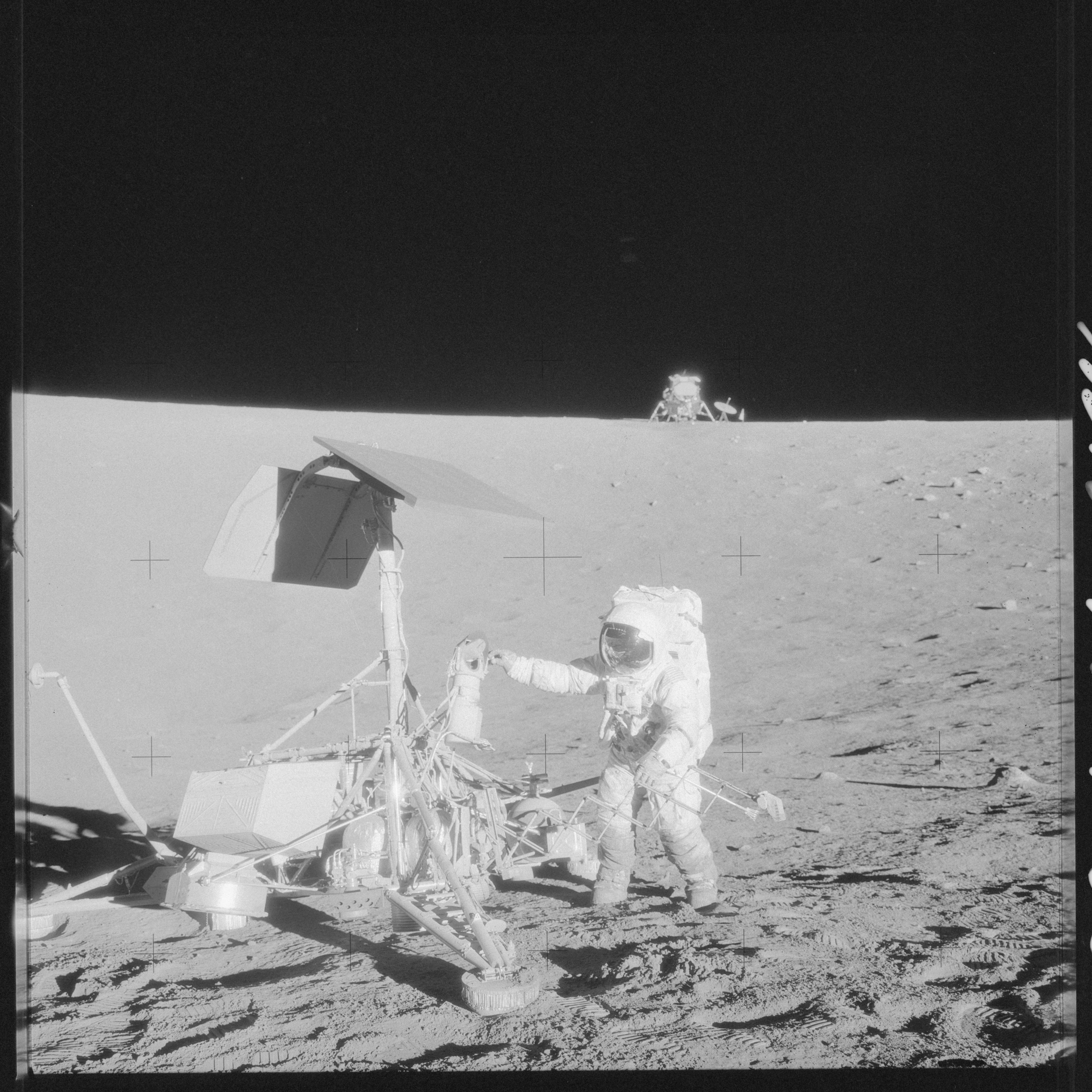
Apollo 12 astronaut Pete Conrad with Surveyor 3 and Apollo 12 lunar base with the Intrepid lander and S-band antenna in the background, in a first ever visit of a separate mission beyond Low Earth Orbit

=== Space infrastructure ===
A permanent human presence in space depends on an established space infrastructure which harbours, supplies and maintains human presence. Such infrastructure has originally been Earth ground-based, but with increased numbers of satellites and long-duration missions beyond the near side of the Moon space-to-space based infrastructure is being used. First simple interplanetary infrastructures have been created by space probes particularly when employing a system which combines a lander and a relaying orbiter.

Space stations are space habitats which have provided a crucial infrastructure for sustaining a continuous direct human, including non-human, presence in space. Space stations have been continuously present in orbit around Earth from Skylab in 1973, to the Salyut stations, Mir and eventually ISS. The current Artemis program includes a lunar station to research longer extraterrestrial stays and their effects.

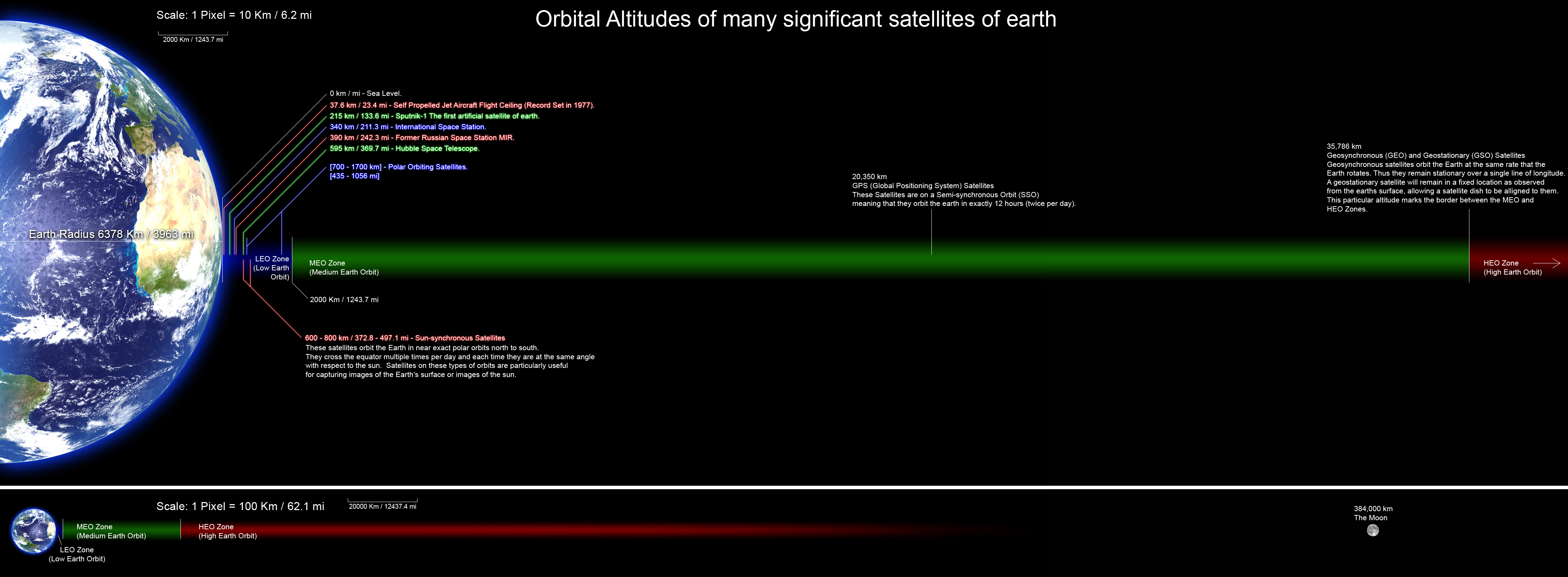
Orbital altitudes of several significant satellites of Earth

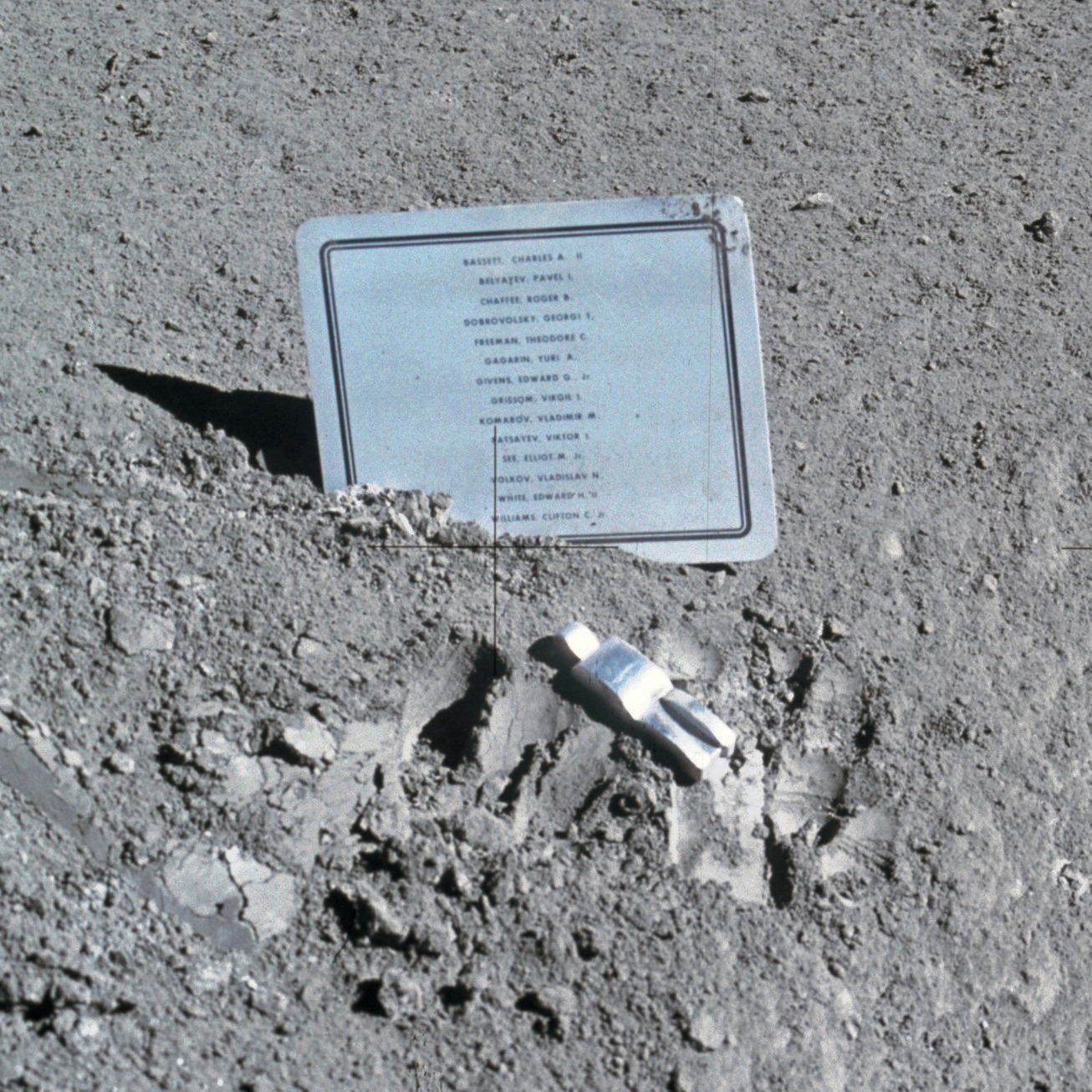
Fallen Astronaut sculpture by Paul Van Hoeydonck, placed on the Moon by David Scott of Apollo 15

=== Spiritual and artistic ===
Human presence has also been expressed through spiritual and artistic installations in outer space or on the Moon.

Apollo 15 Mission Commander David Scott left for example a Bible on their Lunar Roving Vehicle during an extravehicular activity on the Moon. Space has furthermore been the site of people taking part in religious festivities such as Christmas on the International Space Station.

== Locations ==
=== Particular orbits ===
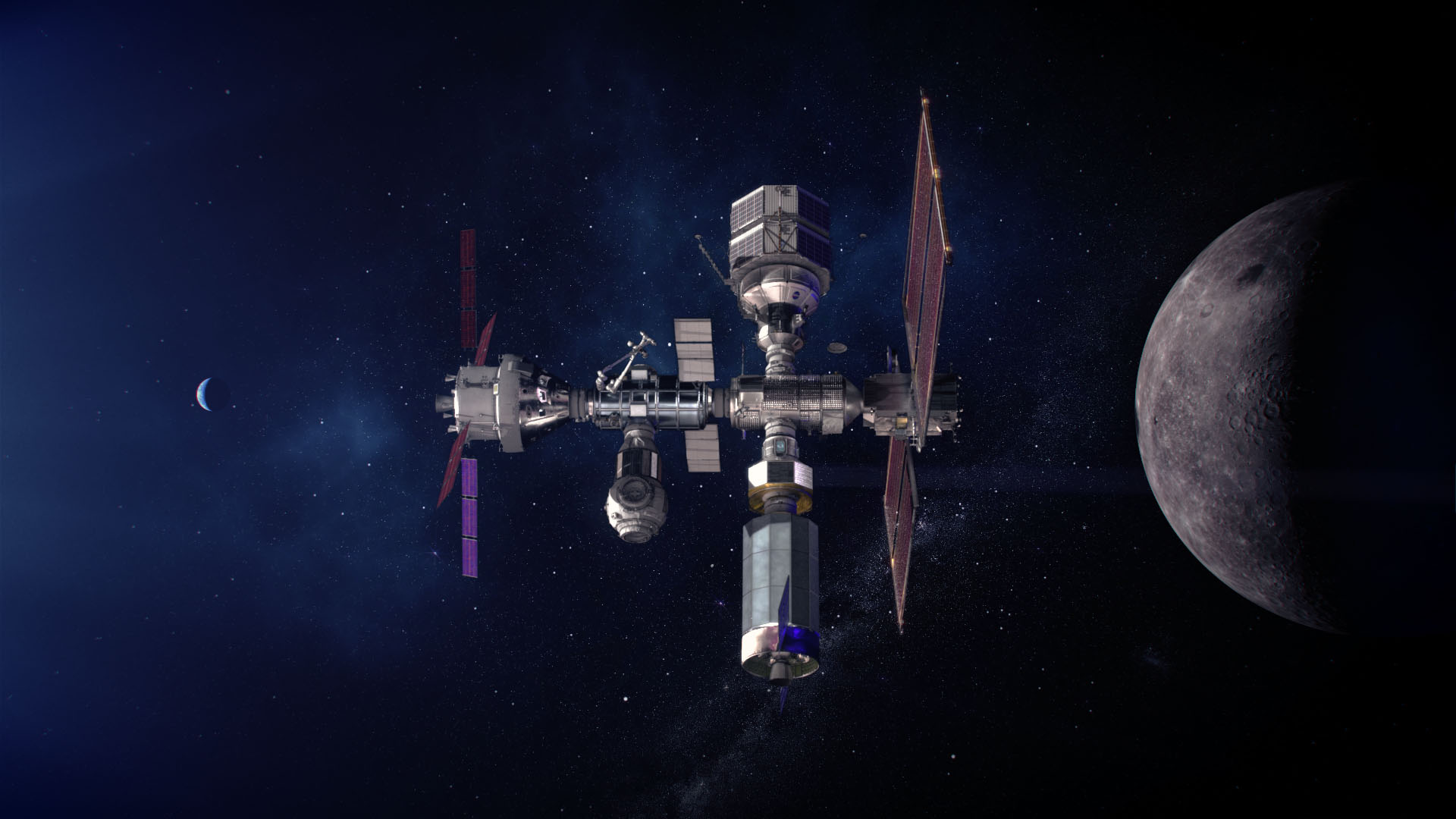
Concept art of the previously planned first space station outside of Low Earth Orbit in near-rectilinear halo orbit around the Earth-Moon lagrange point L-2 called Lunar Gateway

Human presence in Earth orbit and heliocentric orbit has been the case with a range of artificial objects since the beginning of spaceflight (in orbit since 1957 with Sputnik 1 and heliocentric orbit since 1959 with Luna 1), and at more interplanetary heliocentric orbits since 1961 with Venera 1. Extraterrestrial orbits other than heliocentric orbit has been achieved since 1966, starting with Luna 10 around the Moon and several at the same time in orbit of the Moon that same year starting with Lunar Orbiter 1, and since 1971 with Mariner 9 around another planet (Mars).

Humans have also used and occupied co-orbital configurations, particularly at different liberation points with halo orbits, to harness the benefits of those so called Lagrange points.

Some interplanetary missions, particularly the Ulysses solar polar probe and considerably Voyager 1 and 2, as well as others like Pioneer 10 and 11, have entered trajectories taking them out of the ecliptic plane.

=== Extraterrestrial bodies ===
Humanity has reached different types of astronomical bodies, but the longest and most diverse presence (including non-human, e.g. sprouting plants) has been on the Moon, particularly because it is the first and only extraterrestrial body having been directly visited by humans.

Space probes have been establishing and mediating human presence interplanetarily since their first visits to Venus. Mars has seen a continuous presence since 1997, after being first flown by in 1964 and landed on in 1971. A group of missions have been present on Mars since 2001, including continuous presence by a series of rovers since 2003.

Selfie of the Mars rover Perseverance and of Ingenuity, the first aircraft to conduct a powered and controlled extraterrestrial flight.

Beside having reached some planetary-mass objects (that is planets, dwarf planets or the largest, so-called planetary-mass moons), humans have also reached, landed and in some cases even returned robotic probes from some small Solar System bodies, like asteroids and comets, with a range of space probes.

The Solar System region near the Sun's corona, inside Mercury's orbit, with its high gravitational potential difference from Earth and the subsequent high delta-v needed to reach it, has only been considerably pierced on highly elliptic orbits by some solar probes like Helios 1 & 2, as well as the more contemporary Parker Solar Probe. The latter being the closest to reach the Sun, breaking speed records with its very low solar altitudes at perihelion apsis.

Future direct human presence beyond Earth's orbit is possibly going to be re-introduced if current plans for crewed research stations to be established on Mars and on the Moon are continued to be developed.

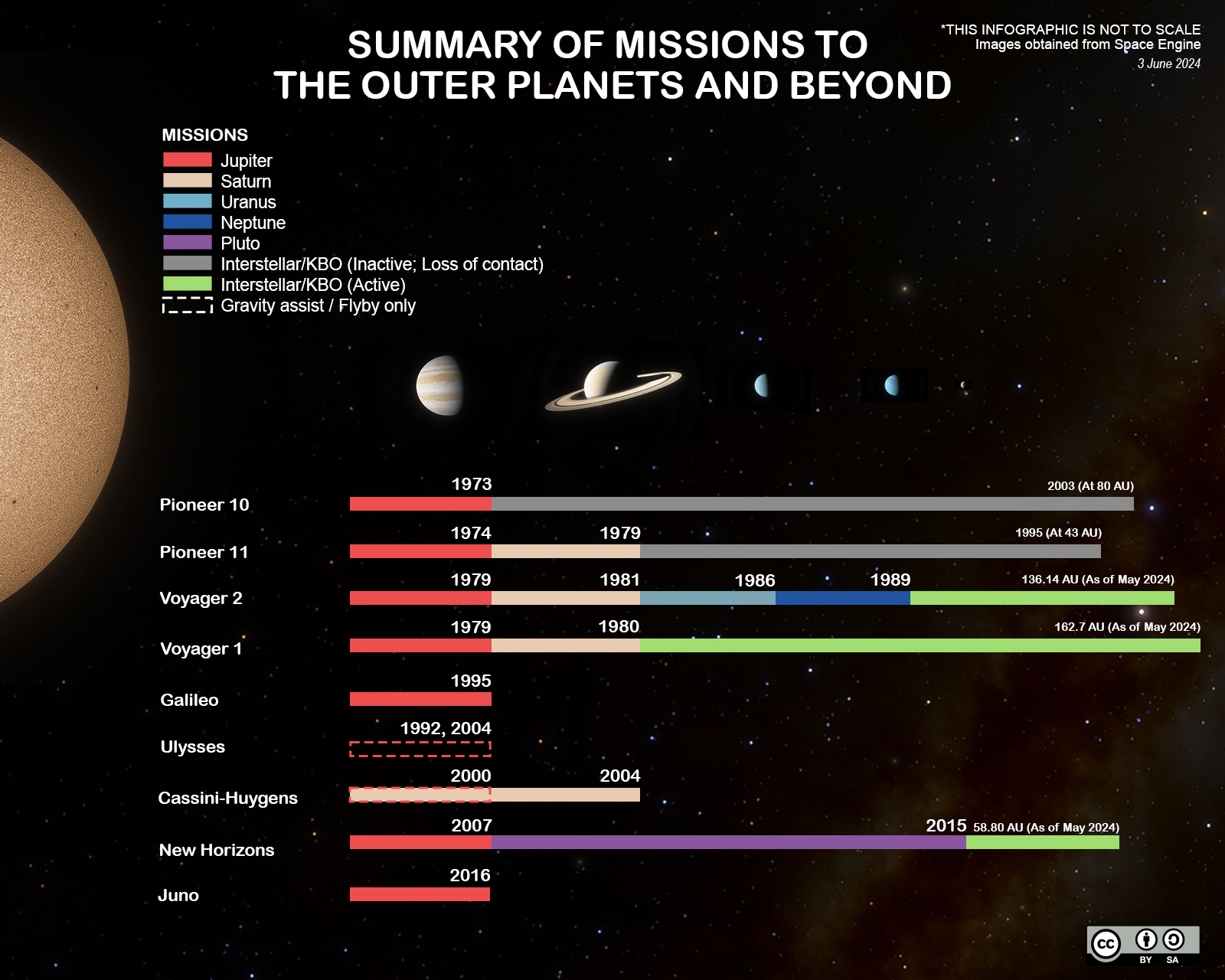
Summary of missions to the outer planets and beyond.

=== Outer Solar System ===
Human presence in the outer Solar System has been established by the first visit to Jupiter in 1973 by Pioneer 10. Thirty years later nine probes had traveled to the Outer Solar System, and the first such probe (JUICE, the Jupiter Icy Moons Explorer) by another space agency than NASA had just been launched on its way. Jupiter and Saturn are the only outer Solar System bodies which have been orbited by probes (Jupiter: Galileo in 1995 and Juno in 2016; Saturn: Cassini–Huygens in 2004), with all other outer Solar System probes performing flybys.

The Saturn moon Titan, with its special lunar atmosphere, has so far been the only body in the outer Solar System to be landed on by the Cassini–Huygens lander Huygens in 2005.

=== Outbound ===
Several probes have reached Solar escape velocity, with Voyager 1 being the first to cross after 36 years of flight the heliopause and enter interstellar space on August 25, 2012, at distance of 121 AU from the Sun.

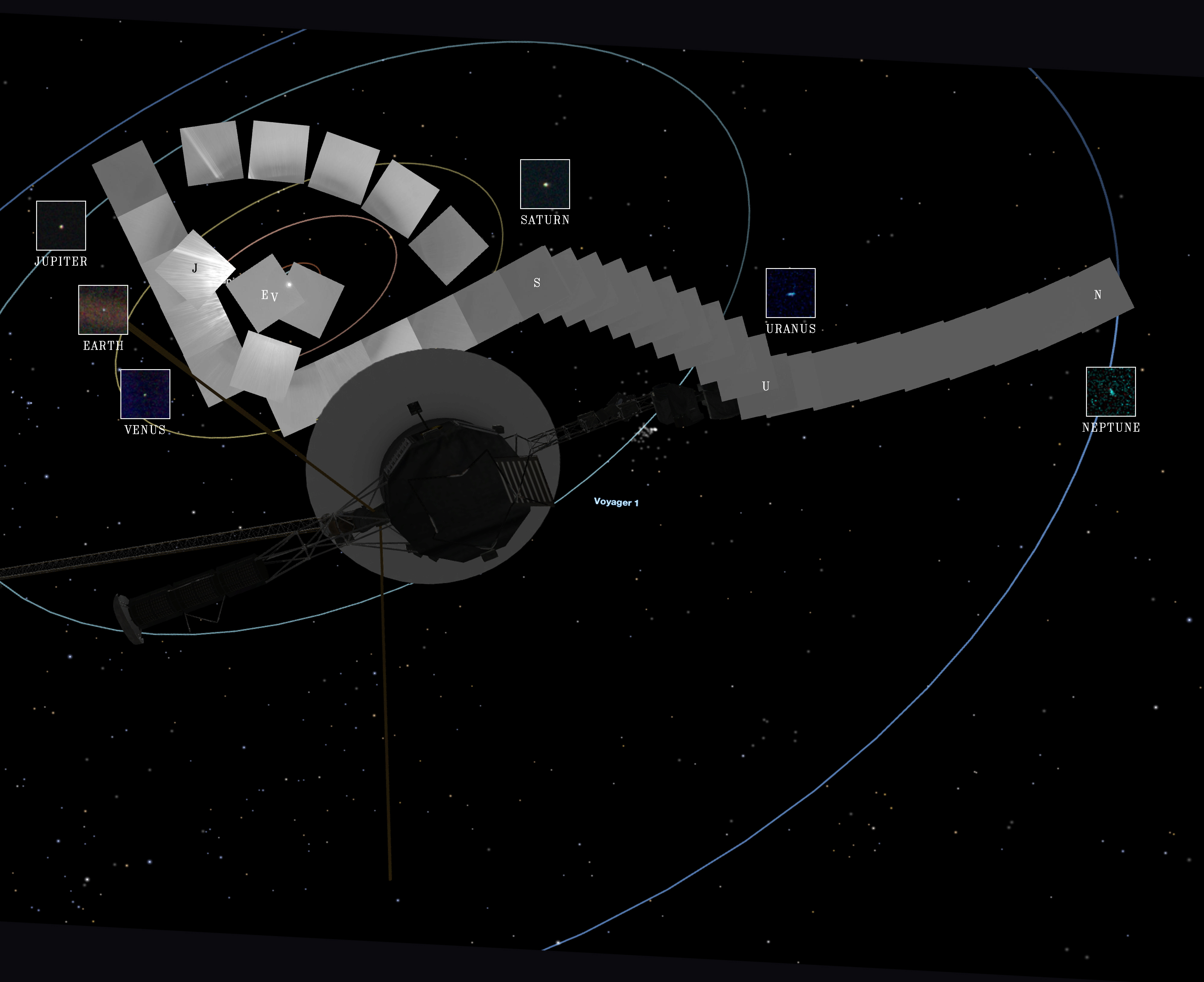
The updated Family Portrait collage of the most recent pictures of the Solar System taken by Voyager 1 (12 February 2020)

== Living in space ==
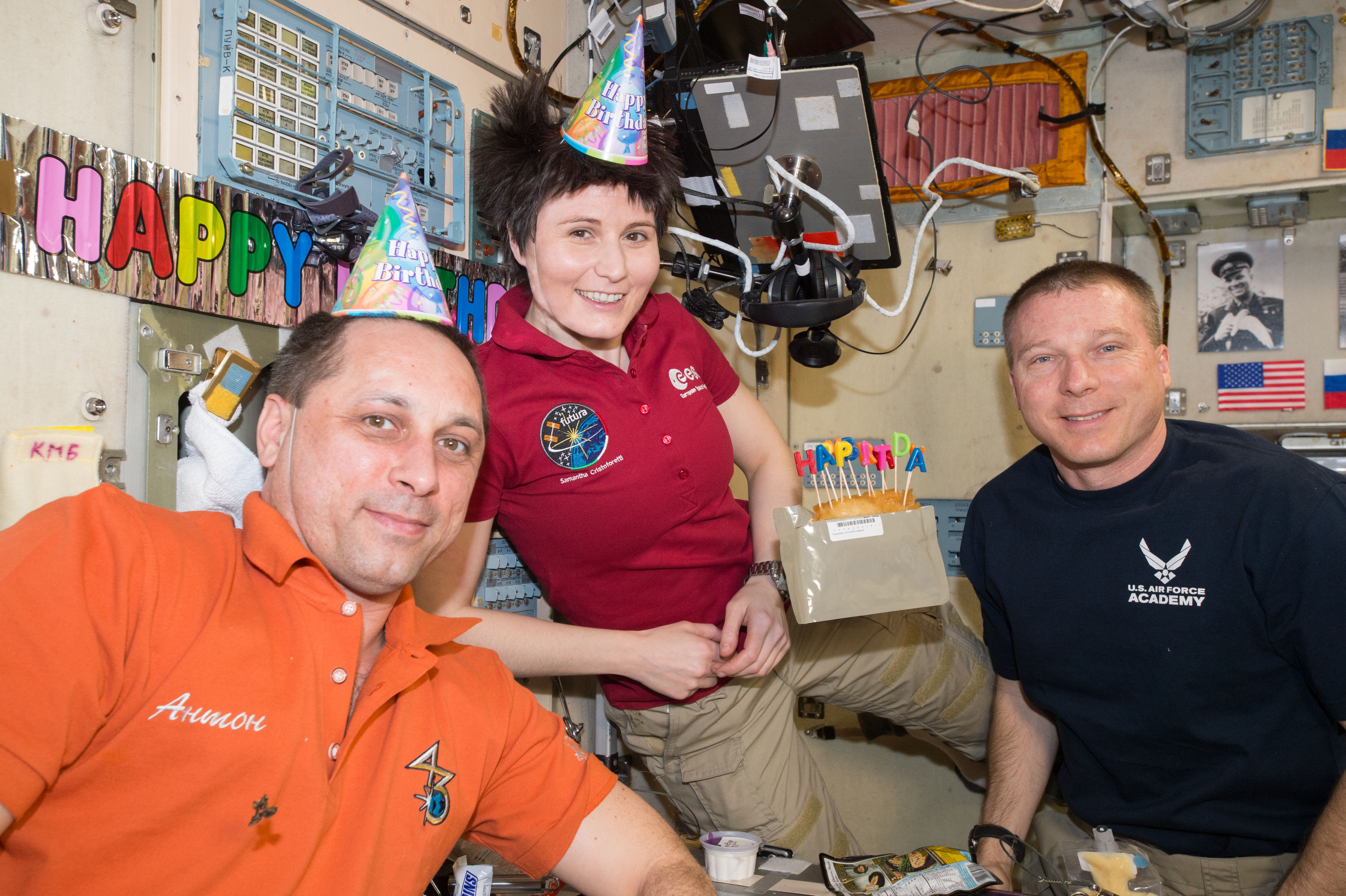
Expedition 43 crew celebrate a birthday in Zvezda the ISS service module, 2015.

Living in outer space is fundamentally different to living on Earth. It is shaped by the characteristic environment of outer space, particularly its microgravity (producing weightlessness) and its near perfect vacuum (supplying few and producing unhindered exposure to radiation and material from far away). Mundane needs such as for air, pressure, temperature and light have to be accommodated completely by life support systems. Furthermore movement, food intake and hygiene is confronted with challenges.

Long-duration stays are particularly endangered by the prevalent radiation exposure and the health effects of microgravity. Human fatalities have been the case due to accidents during spaceflight, particularly at launch and reentry. With the last in-flight accident killing humans, the Columbia disaster in 2003, the sum of in-flight fatalities has risen to 15 astronauts and 4 cosmonauts, in five separate incidents. Over 100 others have died in accidents during activity directly related to spaceflight or testing. None of them remained in space, but small parts of the remains of deceased people have been taken as space burials to orbital space since 1992 and controversially even to the Moon since 1999.

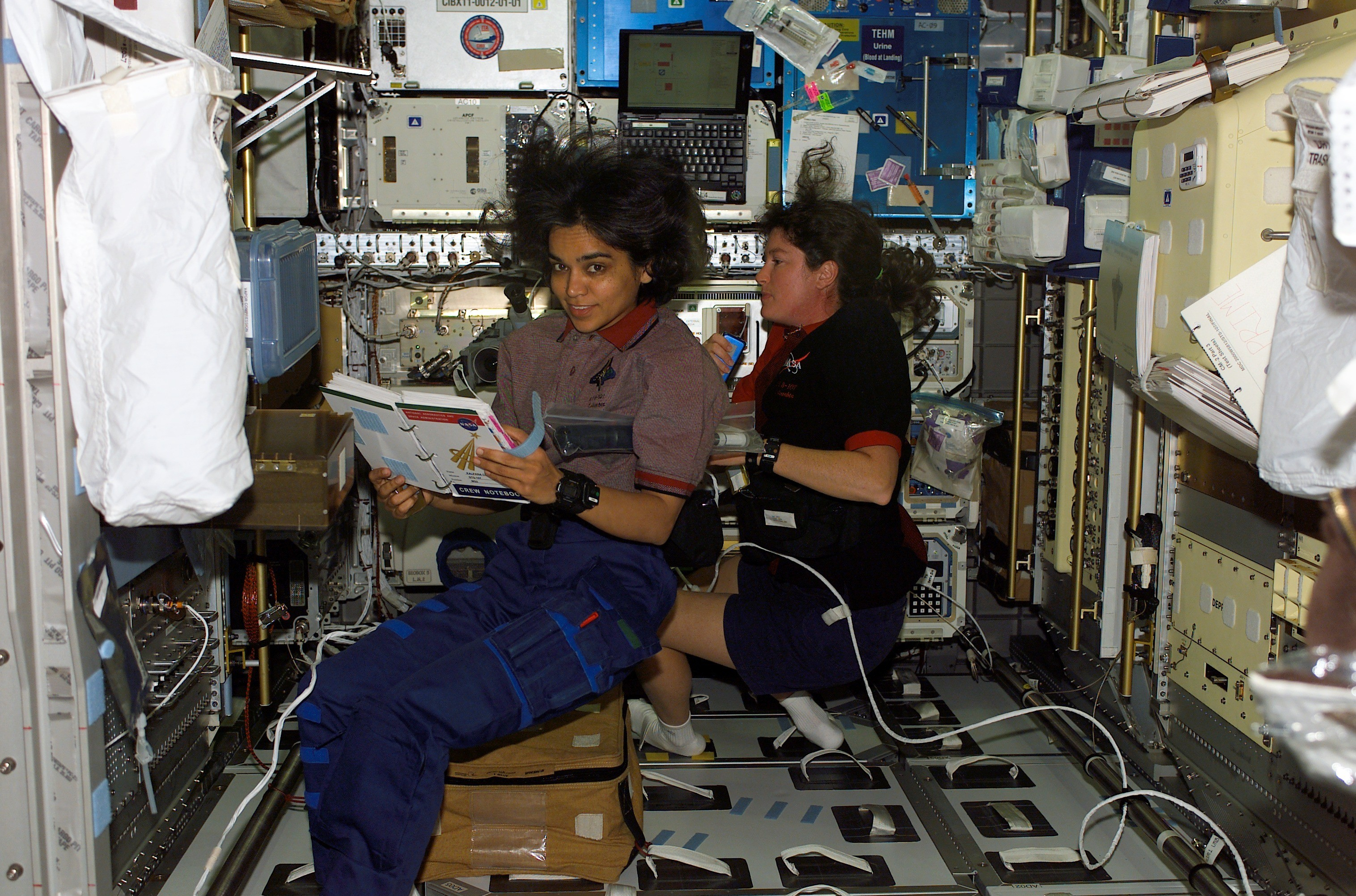
Kalpana Chawla (foreground), the first Indian woman in space, and Laurel Clark on STS-107 before the crew's fatal return flight, 2003

Bioastronautics, space medicine, space technology and space architecture are fields which are occupied with alleviating the effects of space on humans and non-humans.

=== Culture ===
Research has begun into the culture and "microsocieties" that are formed in space, with space archeologists analyzing residue from space environments to learn about astronaut life. A few incidents of astronauts from different countries having difficulties in getting along have also been studied.

== Impact, environmental protection and sustainability ==
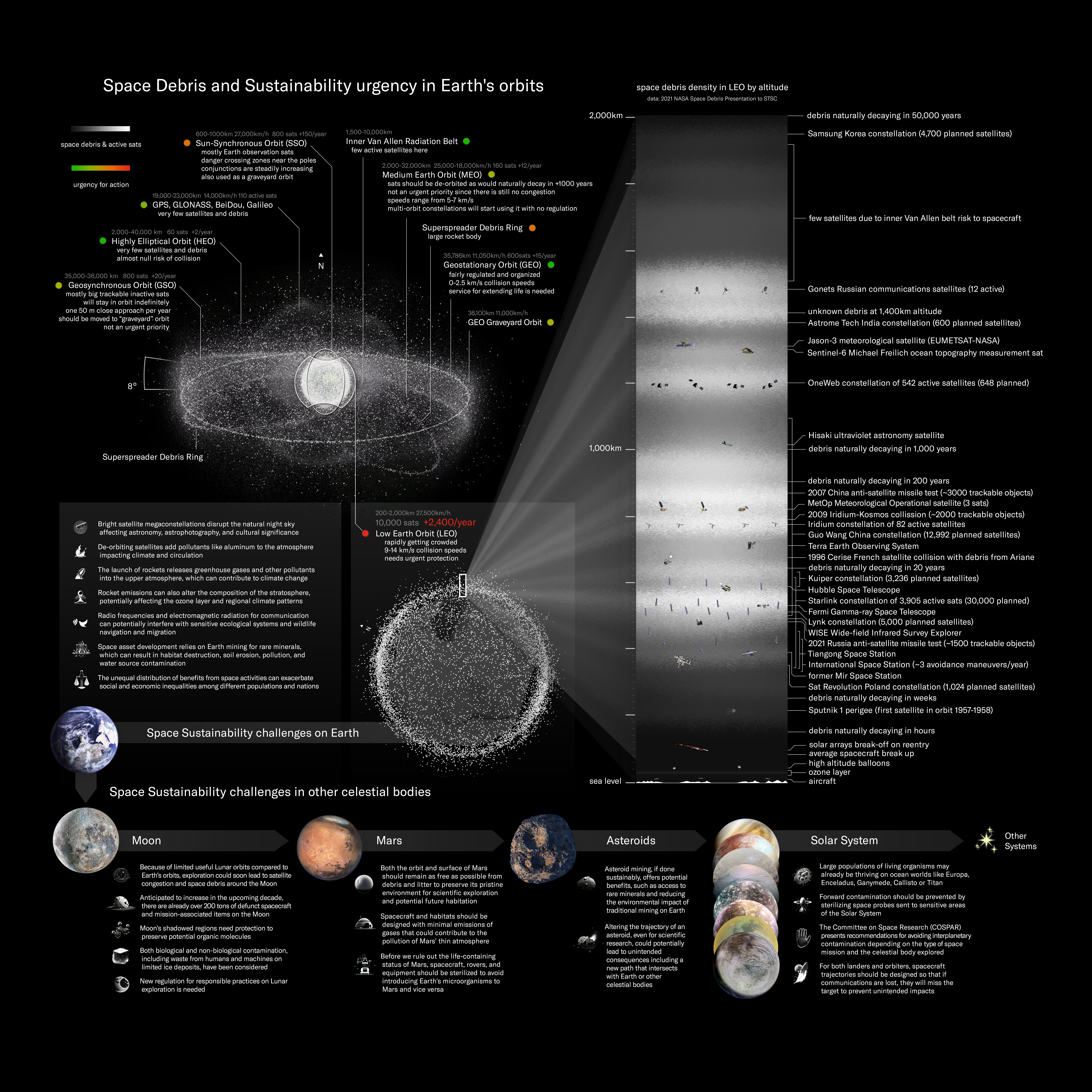
Overview of key space sustainability issues under consideration

Human space activity, and its subsequent presence, can and has been having an impact on space as well as on the capacity to access it. This impact of human space activity and presence, or its potential, has created the need to address its issues regarding planetary protection, space debris, nuclear hazards, radio pollution and light pollution, to the reusability of launch systems, for space not to become a sacrifice zone.

Sustainability has been a goal of space law, space technology and space infrastructure, with the United Nations seeing the need to advance long-term sustainability of outer space activities in space science and application, and the United States having it as a crucial goal of its contemporary space policy and space program.

Human presence in space is particularly being felt in orbit around Earth. The orbital space around Earth has seen increasing and extensive human presence, beside its benefits it has also produced a threat to it by carrying with it space debris, potentially cascading into the so-called Kessler syndrome. This has raised the need for regulation and mitigation of such to secure a sustainable access to outer space.

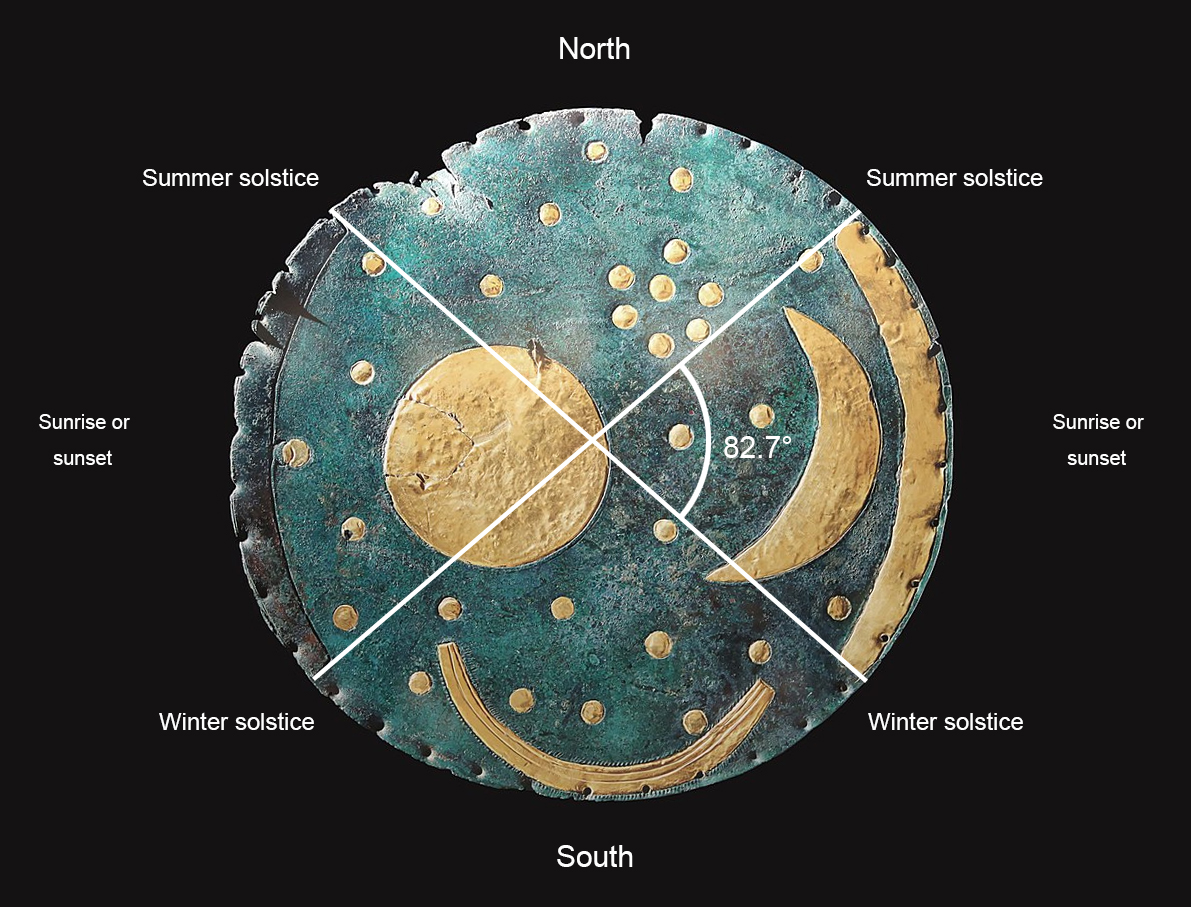
The Nebra sky disc (c. 1800–1600 BCE), one of the oldest astronomical artifacts, displaying the Sun, possibly the Pleiades and the Moon as a crescent, and gold strips on the side of the disc marking the summer and winter solstices, and the top representing the horizon and north

== Study and reception ==
Individually or as a society humans have engaged since pre-history in developing their perception of space above the ground, or the cosmos at large, and developing their place in it.

Social sciences have been studying such works of people from pre-history to the contemporary with the fields of archaeoastronomy to cultural astronomy. With actual human activity and presence in space the need for fields like astrosociology and space archaeology have been added.

=== Human presence observed from space ===
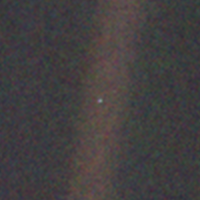
Pale Blue Dot: Earth from beyond the planets of the Solar System, imaged by Voyager 1

Earth observation has been one of the first missions of spaceflight, resulting in a dense contemporary presence of Earth observation satellites, having a wealth of uses and benefits for life on Earth.

Viewing human presence from space, particularly by humans directly, has been reported by some astronauts to cause a cognitive shift in perception, especially while viewing the Earth from outer space, this effect has been called the overview effect. A planetary understanding of life on Earth has given rise to an understanding of Earth as homeworld with a precious ecosystem, which we need to take care of, as famously described in Terre-Patrie (1993) by Edgar Morin or Carl Sagan in his description of Earth as a Pale Blue Dot in space.

=== Perception of space from space ===
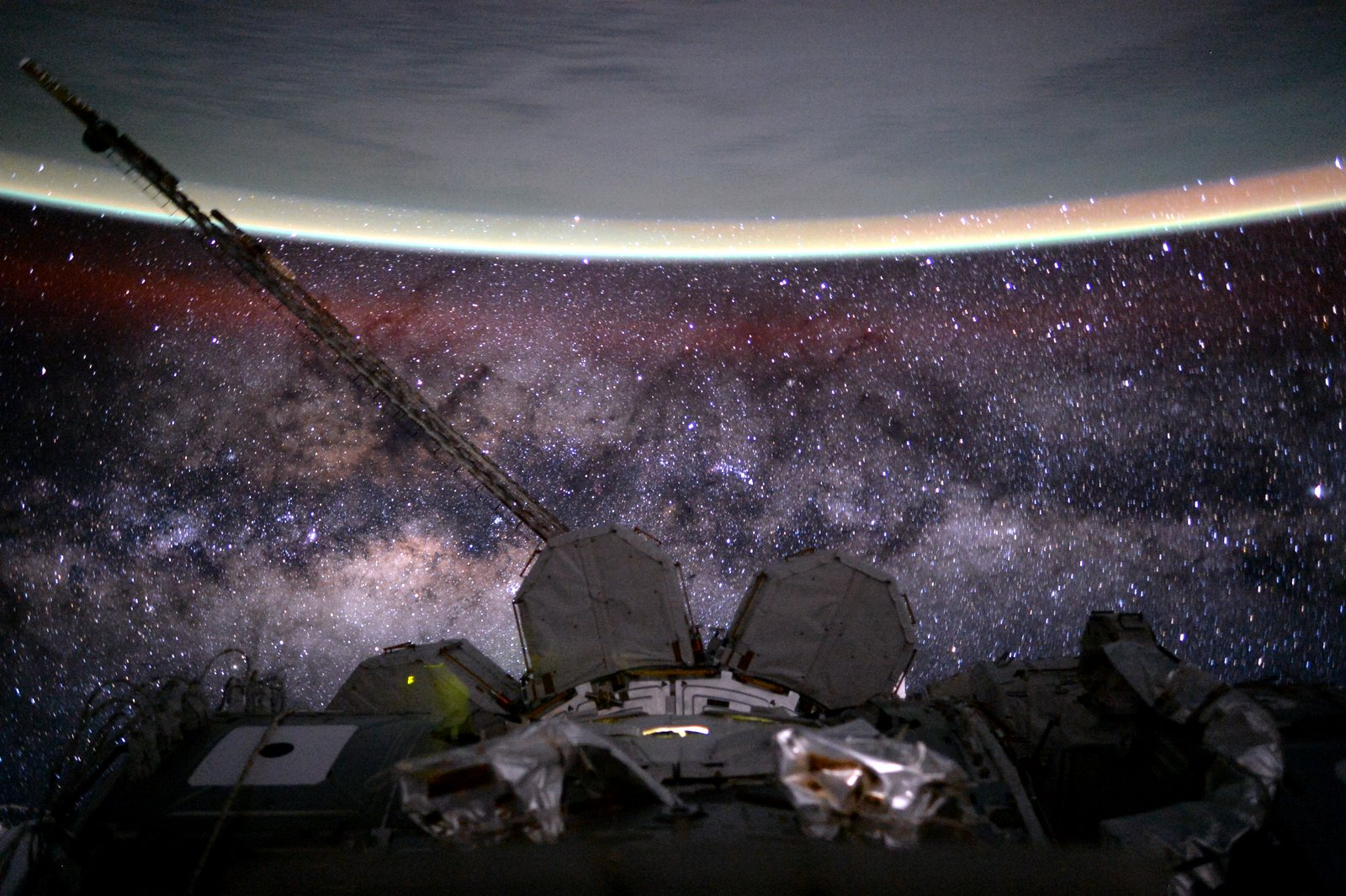
View from International Space Station, showing the yellow-green airglow of Earth's ionosphere with the Milky Way in the background.

Earthshine illuminates parts of the Moon and possibly either or both the solar corona and the zodiacal light are visible as a spiking glow around the Moon.

Parallel to the above overview effect the term "ultraview effect" has been introduced for a subjective response of intense awe some astronauts have experienced viewing large "starfields" while in space.

Space observatories like the Hubble Space Telescope have been present in Earth's orbit, benefiting from advantages from being outside Earth's atmosphere and away from its radio noise, resulting in less distorted observation results.

=== Direct and mediated human presence ===
Related to the long discussion of what human presence constitutes and how it should be lived, the discussion about direct (e.g. crewed) and mediated (e.g. uncrewed) human presence, has been decisive for how space policy makers have chosen human presence and its purposes.

The relevance of this issue for space policy has risen with the advancement and resulting possibilities of telerobotics, to the point where most of the human presence in space has been reallized robotically, leaving direct human presence behind.

=== Localization in space ===
The location of human presence has been studied throughout history by astronomy and was significant in order to relate to the heavens, that is to outer space and its bodies.

The historic argument between geocentrism and heliocentrism is one example about the location of human presence.

A diagram of Earth's location in the observable Universe. Alternative version: block arranged collage

=== Scenarios of and relations to space beyond human presence ===
Realizations of the scales of space, have been taken as subject to discuss human and life's existence or relations to space and time beyond them, with some understanding humanity's or life's presence as a singularity or one to be in isolation, pondering on the Fermi paradox.

A diverse range of arguments of how to relate to space beyond human presence have been raised, with some seeing space beyond humans as reason to venture out into space and exploring it, some aiming for contact with extraterrestrial life, to arguments for protection of humanity or life from its possibilities.

Considerations about the ecological integrity and independence of celestial bodies, counter exploitive understandings of space as dead, particularly in the sense of terra nullius, have raised issues such as rights of nature.

==== Extraterrestrialness ====
Extraterrestrialness is the imagination or description of otherworldlyness, alienness or outright outer space, characterizing the other through extraterrestrial space, beyond mere extraterritoriality or periphery, being the space that is imagined or described as extraterrestrial, or simply any space outside a described land. It creates conditions of extraterrestrialness, spatially set apart otherness, unlike any othered cohabiting entity.

Extraterrestriality has been a feature of many past and contemporary cultures. Politically it has been an element of utopianism and colonialism, particularly its formation, colonies being the product in extraterrestrial space. Such histories have informed contemporary cultures of extraterrestriality, informing the prospecting of space exploration and the reception of its findings, particularly for space colonization and the search for extraterrestrial life. Colonialism was associated with extraterrestrial space already in the first half of the 17th century when John Wilkins suggested in A Discourse Concerning a New Planet that future adventurers like Francis Drake and Christopher Columbus might reach the Moon, and people to live there.

== Purposes and uses ==
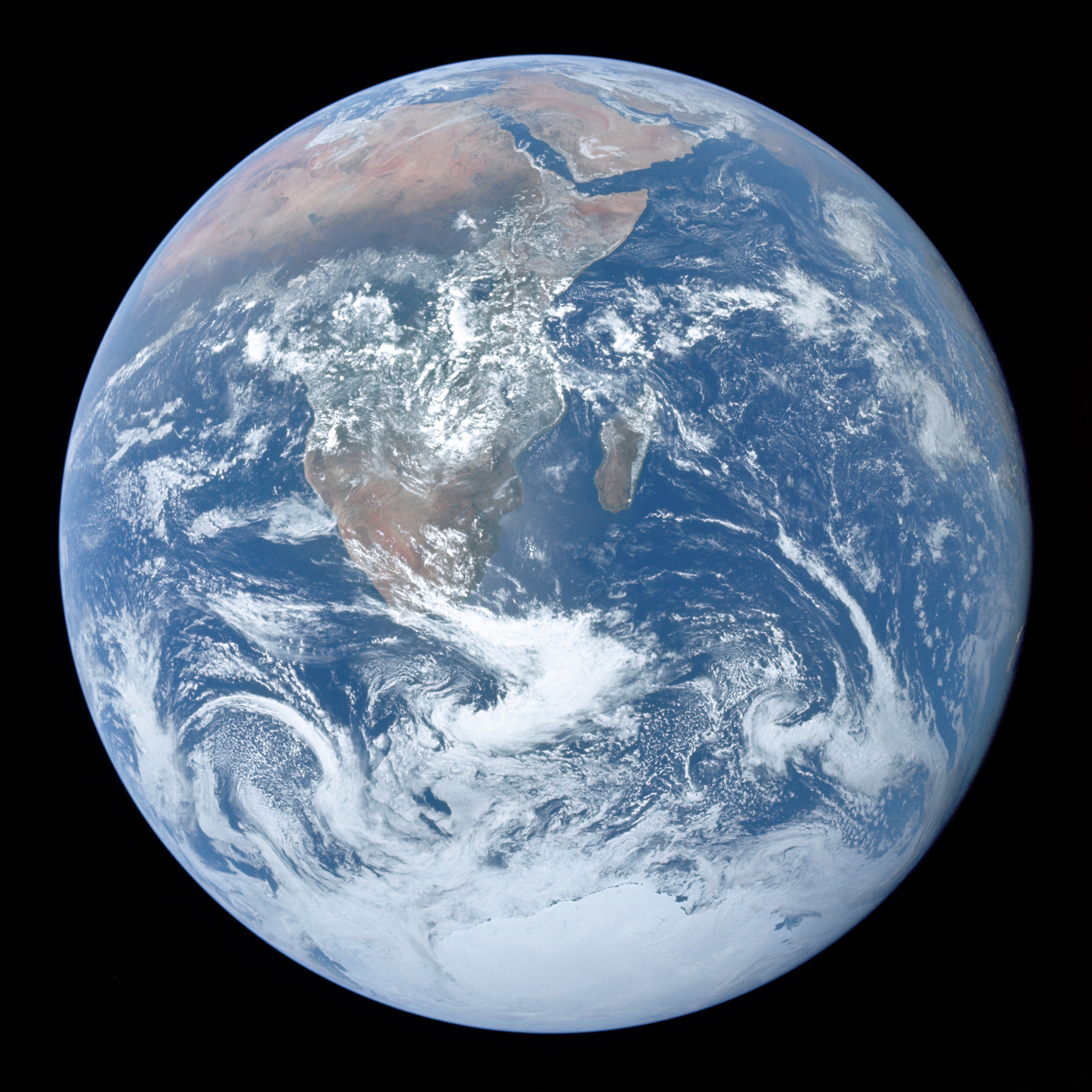
Earth observation, like with this famous image of Earth called The Blue Marble, has been one of the most basic uses of outer space, having enabled a critical awareness of the global dimension of humanity's impact on Earth.

Space and human presence in it has been the subject of different agendas.

The goal of spaceflight developed during high modernity. This was fueled and enabled by the accumulated knowledge about space since the invention of the telescope and its first use (1609, Galileo Galilei) for astronomical observations early into modernity. Fiction and utopian literature started to imagine exploring space, giving rise to science-fiction and space as an envisioned realm reachable by living humans. New coherent world views, with the scales of space in mind, developed, such as the transhumanist cosmism movement, which have been significantly influential in the pursued of spaceflight ever since the groundbreaking Soviet space program.

Human presence in space, at its beginnings, was fueled by the Cold War and its outgrowing the Space Race. During this time technological, nationalist, ideological and military competition were dominant driving factors of space policy and the resulting activity and, particularly direct human, presence in space.

With the waning of the Space Race, concluded by the 1975 Apollo–Soyuz mission, cooperation in human spaceflight focus shifted in the 1970s to further space exploration and telerobotics with a range of achievements and technological advances. Space exploration also engaged governments in the search for extraterrestrial life.

Since human activity and presence in space has produced manyspin-off benefits, such as Earth observation and communication satellites for civilian use, international cooperation to advance such benefits grew with time. Particularly for the purpose of continuing benefits of space infrastructure and space science, the United Nations has pushed for safeguarding human activity in outer space in a sustainable way.

With contemporary so-called NewSpace, interest in commercialization of space has grown along with a narrative of space habitation for the survival of some humans away from and without Earth. This goal has been critically analyzed, and highlights the efforts and intentions of space colonialization and a deeper interest in the fields of space environment and space ethics.

"If you can't take love to the stars, then what are we doing? [...] That's why we send humans instead of robots sometimes, that's why we have that firsthand witness."

— Amit Kshatriya, NASA Associate Administrator (2026)

=== Overview of different purposes and uses ===
- Space exploration#Rationales
  - Benefits of space exploration
    - NASA spinoff technologies
  - Space research
    - Earth observation
      - Astronomy
        - Space observatory
      - Search for extraterrestrial life (see also first contact)
  - Communication
  - Spaceflight/Space transportation
  - Commercial use of space
    - Space tourism
    - Space mining (see also Surface chauvinism and surfacism)
    - Space manufacturing
    - Environmental dumping
  - Planetary protection
    - Planetary defense
    - Isolationism
- For presence, in itself (see Human outpost space basing)
  - Space imperialism
    - National or private potency and competition (see Space Race)
    - Militarization of space
  - Extraterrestrial settlement
    - Emigration from Earth
      - Integration or naturalization (see also biological naturalization such as Pantropy)
      - Demographic push (e.g. due to overconsumption)
      - Forced displacement
      - Space and survival
      - Escapism
  - Space development as a purpose of progress (see also New Frontier)
    - Expansionism
      - Space colonization
      - Civilizing mission
        - Terraforming (see also Ethics of terraforming)
        - Directed panspermia

== See also ==
- Category:Outer space lists
  - Category:Lists of outer space lists
- Outline of space science
- Outline of space exploration
- Timeline of Solar System exploration
- List of spaceflight records
- Rights of nature
- Anthropogenic metabolism
- Anthroposphere
- Collective consciousness
- Scale (analytical tool)
- Noosphere
- Ecological civilization
- Human impact on the environment
- World Ocean § Anthropogenic presence and impact
- Human ecology
- Technosignature
- Extremophile
