= Lists of artificial objects sent into space =

The term artificial objects is closely associated with made by humans or not naturally occurring items that have been sent into space. This is a list of lists of artificial objects in space found on Wikipedia.

- Lists of spacecraft
- List of Solar System probes
  - List of active Solar System probes
  - List of space telescopes
- List of extraterrestrial orbiters
  - List of artificial objects in heliocentric orbit, those that orbit the Sun
- List of landings on extraterrestrial bodies
- List of artificial objects on extra-terrestrial surfaces locations excluding:
  - List of artificial objects on Venus
  - List of artificial objects on the Moon
  - List of artificial objects on Mars
- List of artificial objects leaving the Solar System

For the general concept of artificial see Artificiality. For artificial objects not in space, see Category:Inventions or List of inventions.

== See also ==
- Human presence in space
- Timeline of planetary exploration
- Timeline of artificial satellites and space probes
- Category:Lists of artificial objects sent into space
- Category:Lists of satellites
- Category:Lists of space missions
- Category:Lists of spacecraft
