= Extraterrestrial settlement =

Extraterrestrial settlement can be any type of permanent habitation outside of Earth, beyond its space boundary, such as:

- Space settlement
  - Orbital space station
  - Cycler
  - Interstellar ark
    - Generation ship
- Extraterrestrial surface settlement (incl. extraterrestrial underground settlement)
  - Moonbase
  - Mars base
- Extraterrestrial floating settlement
  - High Altitude Venus Operational Concept (HAVOC)
- Extraterrestrial submerged settlement

== See also ==
- Human presence in space
- Human outpost
