= Population of space =

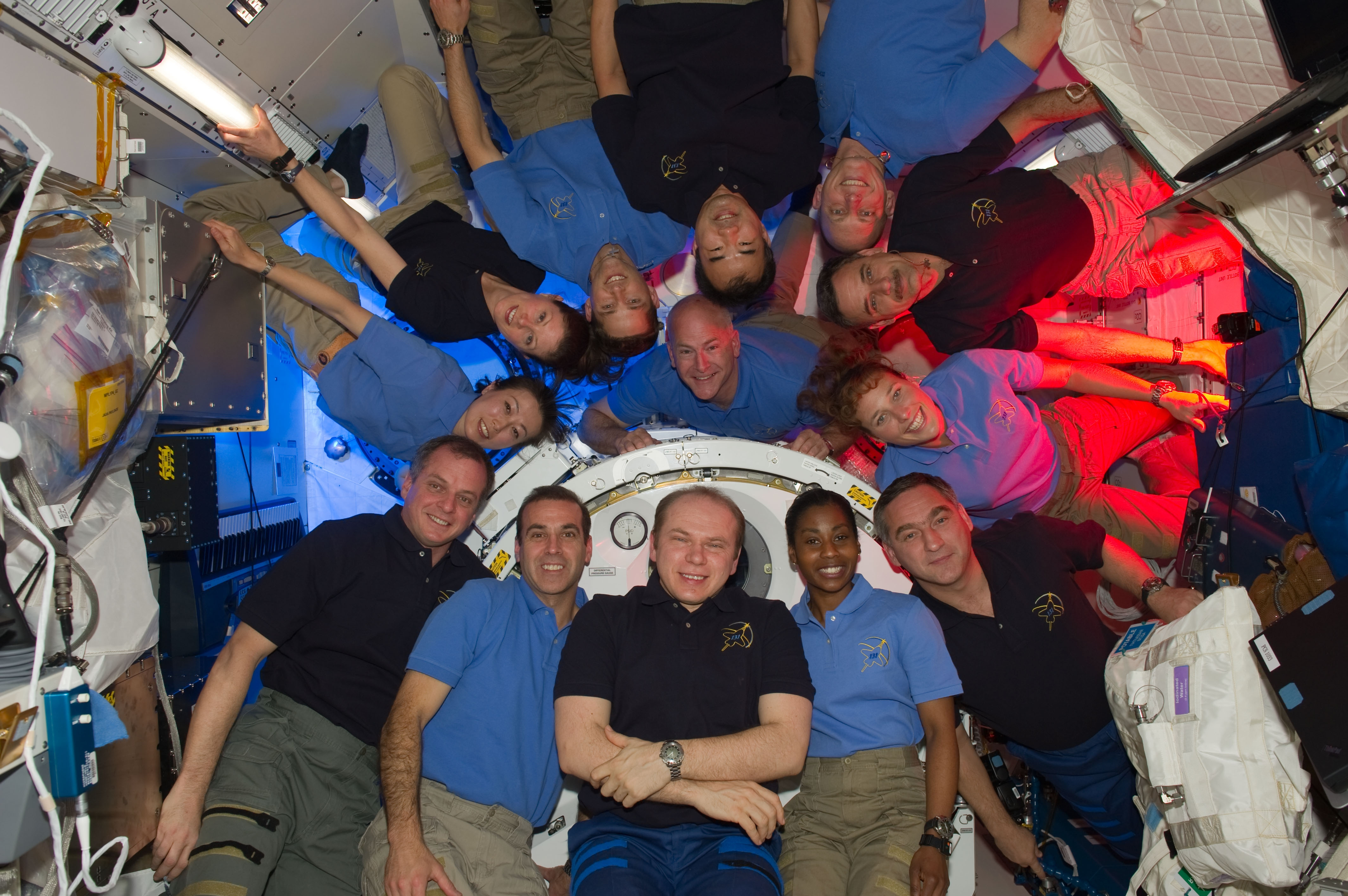
The ISS has hosted the most people in space at the same time, reaching 13 for the first time during the eleven day docking of STS-127 in 2009. Here STS-131 and Expedition 23 crew members gather for a group portrait of 13 in 2010, which set the record of four women at the same time in space.

The last time when no people were in space was 30 October 2000. After this, Expedition 1 to the International Space Station (ISS) launched. Since then, the station has been continually occupied.

Human population records in orbit developed from 1 in 1961, 2 in 1962, 3 in 1964, 4 in 1965, 5 and 7 in 1969, 8 and 11 in 1984, 12 in 1990 and 13 in 1995, to 14 in 2021, 17 in 2023 and 19 in 2024, developing into a continuous population of no less than 10 people on two space stations since 5 June 2022 (as of 2024).

== Timeline of records ==
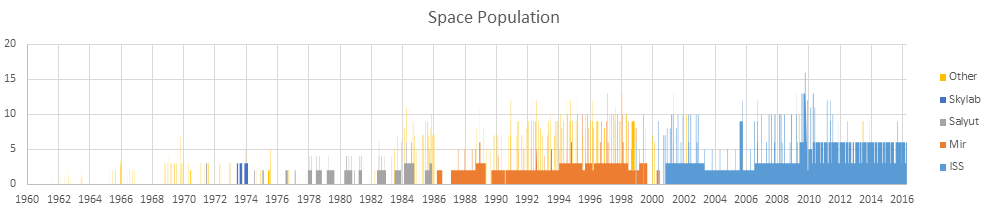

Orbital population records
Year	Population
1961	1
1962	2
1964	3
1965	4
1969	5 and 7
1984	8 and 11
1990	12
1995	13
2021	14
2023	17
2024	19

After Yuri Gagarin's first space flight in 1961, the population reached two with the first close approach of two crewed spacecraft (Vostok 3 and Vostok 4) in 1962. In 1964 a flight of three, in one spacecraft (Voskhod), followed.

In December 1965, the record of the most people in space became four, with the launch and close approach in space of both Gemini 6A and Gemini 7.

In early 1969, the first docking and crew transfer (the only time via a spacewalk) in history, by Soyuz 4 and Soyuz 5, increased the population record to five. In October 1969, the record became seven when the Soviet Union's Soyuz 6, Soyuz 7 and Soyuz 8 were in orbit at the same time.

In 1984, the population reached first eight then eleven with Space Shuttle crews of five at the same time as Salyut 7 space station crews, including an exchange of two crews.

With the start of the 1990s, the maximum population increased to 12 (STS-35 and Mir: Soyuz TM-10/Soyuz TM-11). In March 1995, the record number of people in space became 13 after the launch of Soyuz TM-21. At this time there were two cosmonauts and one American astronaut on the Soyuz, headed towards the three cosmonauts aboard Mir. There were also seven astronauts on Space Shuttle Endeavour.

In September 2021, the record number of people in space became 14 after the launch of SpaceX's Inspiration4.

In December 2021, the record number of people in space (but not orbit) became 19 after the brief suborbital Blue Origin NS-19 spaceflight.

In May 2023, the record number of people in orbit became 17 after the launch of China's Shenzhou 16 mission. Three people were from Shenzhou 16, three from Shenzhou 15, seven people from Expedition 69 on the International Space Station and four people from Axiom Mission 2, who had recently departed from the ISS.

In May 2023, the number of people in space (but not in orbit) was 20 for five minutes when Virgin Galactic Unity 25 took place. This included 6 people from Unity 25, 3 people from Shenzhou 15, seven people from Expedition 69 and four people from Axiom Mission 2.

In September 2024, the record of people in orbit became 19 after the launch of Soyuz MS-26. This included the three astronauts on the MS-26 mission, three more on China's Tiangong space station, four people on the SpaceX Polaris Dawn mission, and nine more on board the ISS.

== Future predictions ==
Space settlements have been proposed to accommodate large numbers of people. Jeff Bezos, the founder of the American aerospace company Blue Origin, has identified such settlements, when built in the millions, as an opportunity to house trillions of humans.

== Population at extraterrestrial bodies ==
Beyond Earth the Moon has been the only astronomical object which so far has seen direct human presence through the Apollo missions between 1968 and 1972, beginning with the first orbit by Apollo 8 in 1968 and with the first landing by Apollo 11 in 1969. The longest extraterrestrial human stay was three days by Apollo 17.

== See also ==
- Human presence in space
