= Benefits of space exploration =

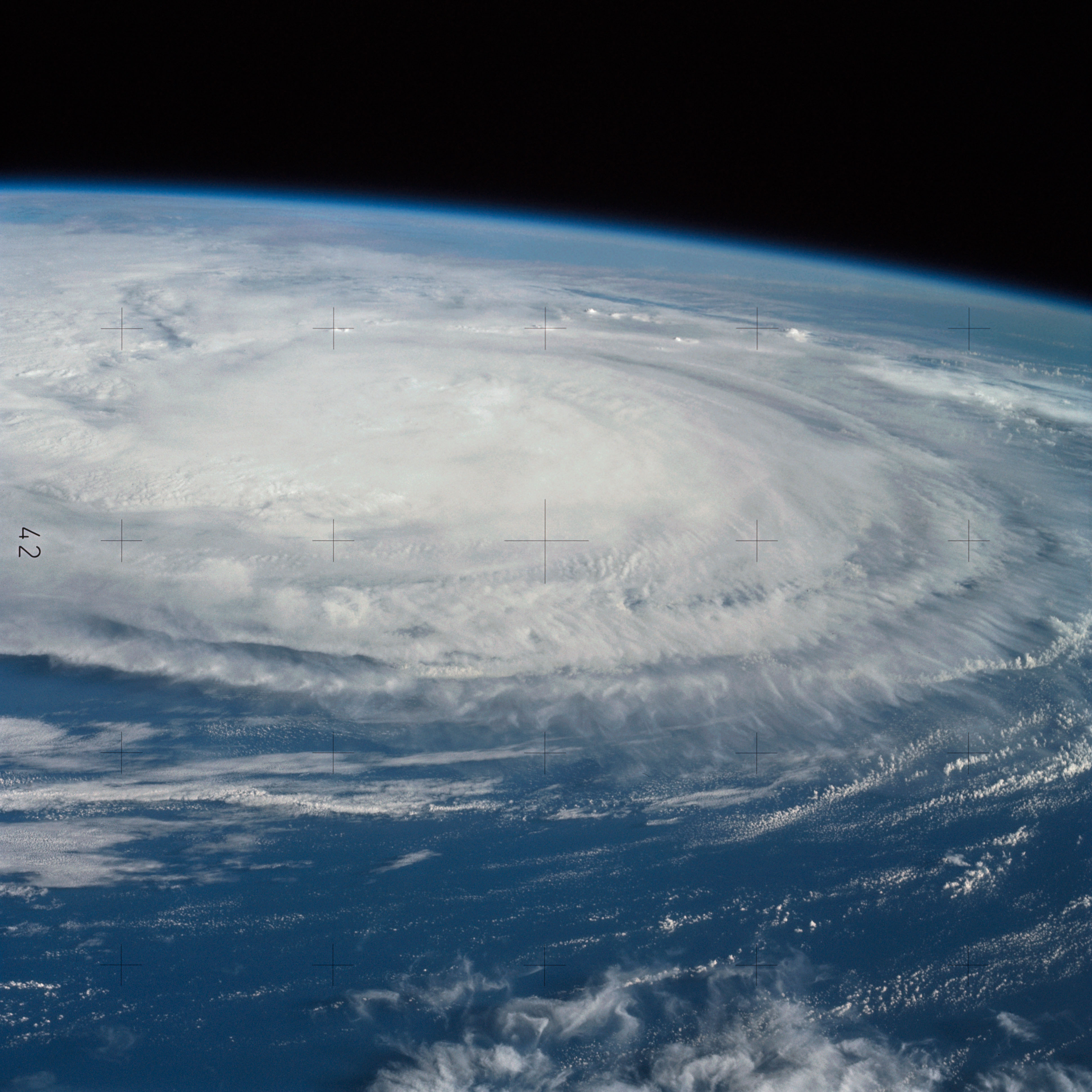
Hurricane Ellen of 1973 was photographed from orbit by astronauts aboard the Skylab space station.

As the space race came to an end, a new rationale for investment in space exploration emerged, focused on the pragmatic use of space for improving life on Earth. The legacy of the space race is that nations continue to pursue space exploration to enhance their prestige. As the justification for government-funded space programs shifted to "the public good", space agencies began to articulate and measure the wider socio-economic benefits that might derive from their activities, including both the direct and indirect (or less obvious) benefits of space exploration. However, such programs have also been criticized with several drawbacks cited.

== Direct and indirect benefits of space exploration ==
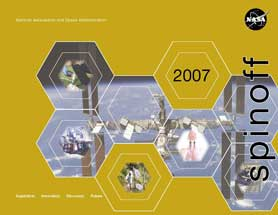

Space agencies, governments, researchers and commentators have isolated a large number of direct and indirect benefits of space exploration programs including:

- New technologies that can be utilized in other industries and society (such as the development of communications satellites)
- Improved knowledge of space and the origin of the universe
- Cultural benefits

In an attempt to quantify the benefits derived from space exploration, NASA calculated that 444,000 lives have been saved, 14,000 jobs have been created, $5 billion in revenue has been generated, and there has been $6.2 billion in cost reductions due to spin-off programs from NASA research. NASA states that among the many spin-off technologies that have come out of the space exploration program, there have been notable advancements in the fields of health and medicine, transportation, public safety, consumer goods, energy and environment, information technology, and industrial productivity. Solar panels, water-purification systems, dietary formulas and supplements, material science innovation, and global search and rescue systems are some of the ways in which these technologies have diffused into everyday life.

== Satellite technology ==
The development of artificial satellite technology was a direct result of space exploration. Since the first artificial satellite (Sputnik 1,) was launched by the USSR on October 4, 1957, thousands of satellites have been put into orbit around the Earth by more than 40 countries.

These satellites are used for a variety of applications including observation (by both military and civilian agencies), communication, navigation, and weather monitoring. Space stations, space telescopes and spacecraft in orbit around the Earth are also regarded as satellites.

=== Communications satellites ===
Communications satellites are used for a variety of purposes including television, telephone, radio, internet and military applications. According to statistics, there were 2,666 active artificial satellites orbiting the Earth in 2020. Of these, 1,327 belonged to the US and 363 to China. Many of these satellites are in geostationary orbit 22,236 miles (35,785 km) above the equator, so that the satellite appears stationary at the same point in the sky. Communications satellites can also be in Medium Earth orbit (known as MEO satellites) with an Orbital altitude ranging from 2,000 to 36,000 kilometres (1,200 to 22,400 mi) above Earth and low Earth orbit (known as LEO satellites) at 160 to 2,000 kilometres (99 to 1,243 mi) above Earth. MEO and LEO orbits are closer to the surface of the Earth and therefore a larger number of satellites are required in such a constellation to provide continuous communications. Satellites are vital for providing communications to remote areas and ships.

=== Weather satellites ===
The United States, Europe, India, China, Russia, and Japan all have weather satellites in orbit that are used to monitor the weather, environment, and climate of the Earth. Polar-orbiting weather satellites cover the entire Earth asynchronously, or geostationary satellites cover the same spot on the equator. In addition to monitoring weather patterns for forecasting, which is extremely important for certain activities and industries (such as farming and fishing), meteorological satellites monitor fires, pollution, auroras, sand, and dust storms, as well as snow cover and ice mapping. They have also been used to monitor ash clouds from volcanoes such as Mount St. Helens and Mount Etna as well as major weather events such as El Niño and the Antarctic ozone hole. Recently, weather monitoring satellites have also been used to assess the viability of solar panel sites by monitoring cloud cover and weather patterns. Nigeria and South Africa have successfully employed satellite-based disaster management and climate monitoring.

=== International Space Station ===
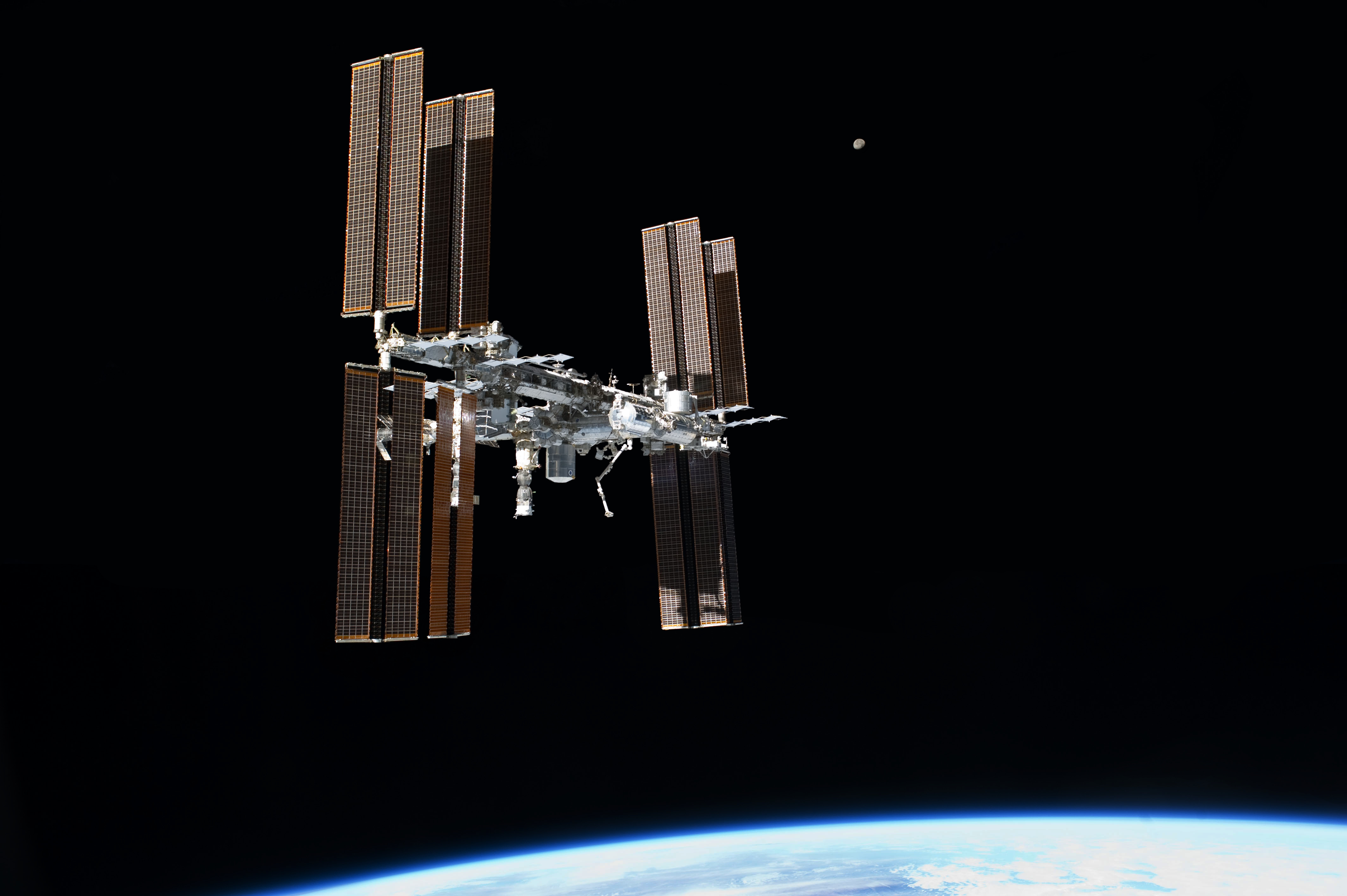
The ISS

The International Space Station is a modular space station (habitable artificial satellite) in low Earth orbit that was built by 18 countries including NASA (US), Roscosmos (Russia), JAXA (Japan), ESA (Europe), and the CSA (Canada). The station serves as a microgravity and space environment research laboratory in which scientific research is conducted in astrobiology, astronomy, meteorology, physics, and other fields. The ISS is also used for testing spacecraft systems and equipment required for future long-duration missions to the Moon and Mars.

=== Hubble Space Telescope ===
The Hubble Space Telescope is a space telescope that was launched into low Earth orbit in 1990 by NASA with contributions from the European Space Agency. It was not the first space telescope, but it is one of the largest and most versatile. Its orbit allows it to capture extremely high-resolution images with substantially lower background light than ground-based telescopes, enabling a deep view into space. Many Hubble observations have led to breakthroughs in astrophysics, such as determining the rate of expansion of the universe.

== Knowledge of space ==
Since Sputnik 1 entered orbit in 1957 to perform Ionospheric experiments, the human understanding of Earth and space has increased. The missions to the Moon begin as early as 1958 and continued into the current age. A few successful lunar missions by the USSR include missions such as the Luna 1 spacecraft that completed the first flyby of the Moon in 1959, the Luna 3 lunar probe that took the first pictures of the far side of the Moon in 1959, the Luna 10 orbiter that was the first orbiter of the Moon in 1966, the Zond 5 circumlunar mission which flew the first Earthlings (two tortoises) to the Moon and safely returned them to Earth, and the Lunokhod 1 lunar rover in 1970, which was the first rover to explore the surface of a world beyond Earth. United States firsts include Apollo 8 in 1968, which carried the first three humans into lunar orbit, and the historic 1969 Apollo 11 mission which first landed humans on the Moon. Missions to the Moon have collected samples of lunar materials and there are now multiple satellites such as ARTEMIS P1 that currently orbit the Moon and collect data.

== Precious metals ==
Proponents of space travel have noted the rich amount of precious metals that exist in space. For example, in 2021, NASA discovered an asteroid called "16 Psyche" which has more gold on it than the value of the global economy, about $10,000 quadrillion (the global economy is about $84.5 trillion). There have also been asteroids that have been discovered that are made of 85% metal, such as iron and nickel, other precious metals that are relatively scarce on Earth, which has garnered optimism for space mining. Metallic asteroids also have other rare metals like platinum, iridium, palladium, osmium, ruthenium and rhodium at a "concentration several times higher than what is found on Earth."

Although regulations may pose as a barrier to the mining of precious metals in space with one advocate for space mining stating, "The rate of regulatory change must accelerate until it can match the rate of technological change!"

== Biomedical research ==

Beginning in 1967, NASA successfully began its Biosatellite program that initially took frog eggs, amoeba, bacteria, plants and mice and studied the effects of zero gravity on these biological life forms. Studies of human life in space have augmented the understanding of the effects of adjusting to a space environment, such as alterations in body fluids, negative influences on the immune system and effects of space on sleep patterns. Current space research pursuits are divided into the subjects of Space Biology, which studies the effects of space on smaller organisms such as cells, Space Physiology, which is the study of the effects of space on the human body and Space Medicine, which examines the possible dangers of space on the human body. The Canadian science experiments in the cardiovascular system examines how astronauts’ blood vessels change before, during and after missions. The study in space helps understand heart failures and how our arteries age on earth. Space engineers helped design heart pumps now used to keep people in need of heart transplant alive until a donor heart becomes available. Discoveries concerning the human body and space, particularly the effects on the development of bones, may provide further understanding of biomineralization and the process of gene transcription.

== Culture and inspiration ==
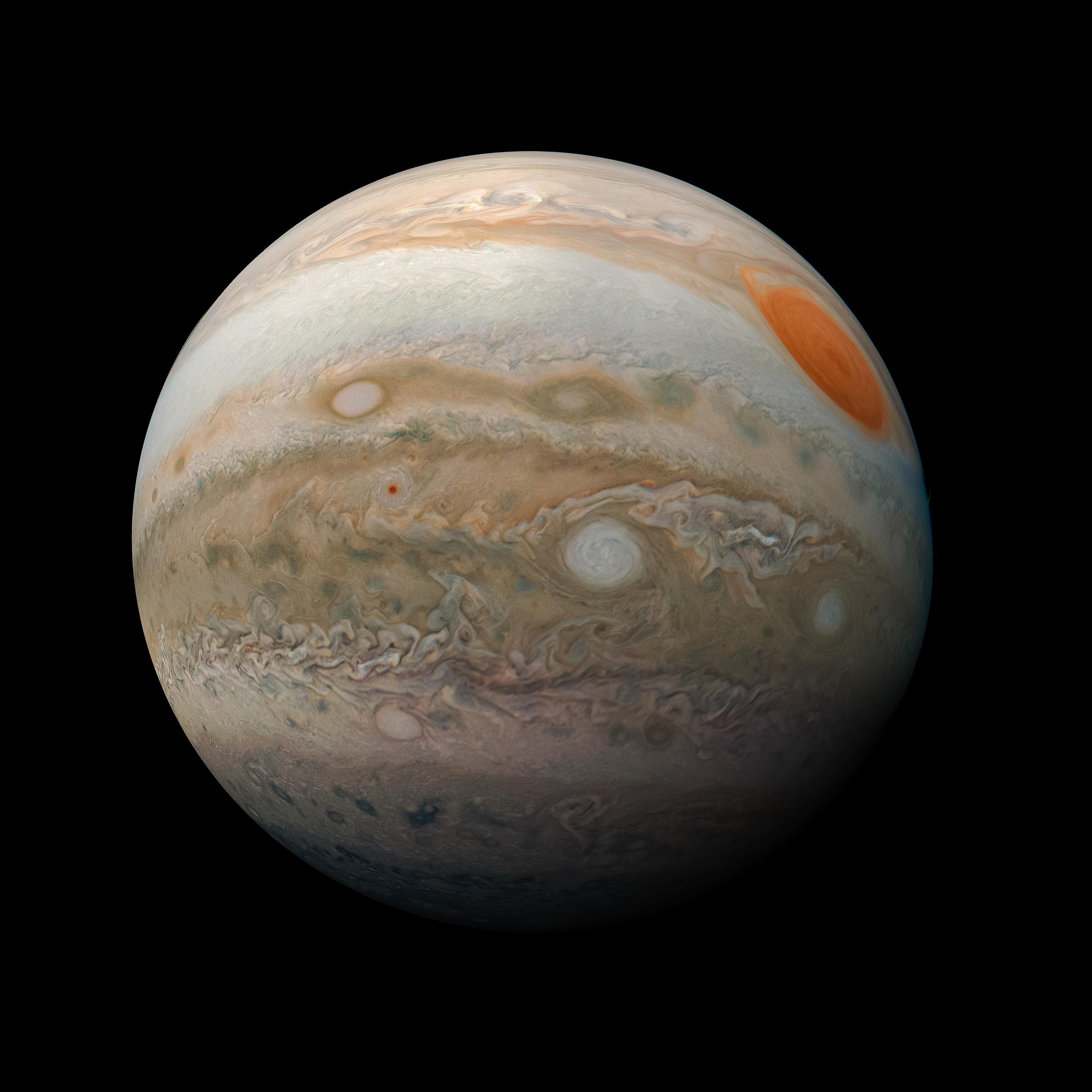
Published by NASA in March 2019, the "Jupiter Marble" by the Juno probe

Culture exists as a social environment made up by traditions, norms, rules written or unwritten, and social practices. Astronaut Jeffrey A. Hoffman stated that space exploration "expands the realm of human experience and of human consciousness". Cultures can be specific to groups of any size such as a family or group of friends but also as large as a state or nation. The range and diversity of human culture is markedly large. International collaboration in the space age brought together different cultures and, as a result, the exchange and advancement of human culture. In over fifty years of space travel, the diversity of those working in space and in the field as a whole has dramatically increased from the beginnings of space exploration. This progression in diversity brought more cultures into close quarters and resulted in the enrichment of human culture globally.

The innovation and exploration of the space age has served as an inspiration to humankind. Breaking through into space travel, humans leaving Earth and defeating gravity, taking steps on the Moon, and various other achievements were pivotal moments in human cultural development. In particular, the scientific and technological advancements stand as an inspiration to the scientific community of students, teachers, and researchers worldwide. Moreover, space exploration has also inspired innovative training programs aimed at preschoolers, such as the Future Astronauts Program. It is evident that by drawing in the wonder of space together with the knowledge and skills developed through space exploration into classrooms, children can be strongly motivated and empowered from a young age.

== Criticisms and drawbacks ==
There are three main types of criticism levied against space exploration: the cost, ideological criticism, and social criticism.

The calculations of the benefits of space exploration have frequently been criticized due to a conflict of interests argument (the agencies responsible are the ones who calculate the benefits) and the complexity of quantifying the benefits. As Matthew Williams stated: "How do you put a dollar value on scientific knowledge, inspiration, or the expansion of our frontiers?"

While some commentators have argued that space exploration is a lifeboat strategy to avoid annihilation of the human race, others have countered that it misses the point. Amitai Etzioni – Professor at The George Washington University and an adviser to the US's Carter administration – countered in Humanity Would Be Better off Saving Earth, Rather Than Colonizing Mars that: "It is better to hold off disasters at home than to assume all is lost". Etzioni also pointed out the vast cost of colonization of extraterrestrial planets by citing that Elon Musk, an advocate of space exploration and colonization, had calculated the cost of sending the first 12 astronauts to Mars at £10 billion per person. The Mars Climate Orbiter is a good example of this argument, burning up—before returning any scientific data—at a cost of $328 million.

Social critics say that the cost of space exploration cannot be justified when hunger and poverty are rampant. "As they see it, space exploration takes money, resources, and talent away from helping people in need and from improving the quality of life for everybody." In 1967, Martin Luther King Jr. said: "Without denying the value of scientific endeavor, there is a striking absurdity in committing billions to reach the moon where no people live, while only a fraction of that amount is appropriated to service the densely populated slums."

Some critics have pointed out the hazards of space debris which affect satellites, spacecraft and the surface of the Earth. For example, in March 2009 debris believed to be a 10 cm (3.9 in) piece of the Kosmos 1275 satellite nearly hit the ISS. Although it is relatively rare for people on the ground to be hit by space debris, it does happen. In 1969 five sailors on a Japanese ship were injured by space debris. In 1997 an Oklahoma woman, Lottie Williams, was injured when she was hit in the shoulder by a 10 cm × 13 cm (3.9 in × 5.1 in) piece of blackened, woven metallic material confirmed as part of the propellant tank of a Delta II rocket which launched a U.S. Air Force satellite the year before. Environmentalists have pointed to the pollution caused by space exploration and at distracting Americans from a mounting pollution problem.

Feminists criticized the US space exploration programs, and even filed lawsuits, for sexist hiring practices and all-male astronaut corps.

It is unclear how much the American public agrees with the importance of space exploration. Gallup polls in the 1960s showed that less than 50% of Americans considered the endeavour worth the cost. An NBC News and Associated Press Poll in 1979 found that only 41% of respondents considered the benefits worth the costs. By the 50th anniversary of the Moon landing, the percentage of those favorable to space exploration had recovered to 64%.

== See also ==
- NASA spinoff technologies
