= List of artificial objects in heliocentric orbit =

Below is a list of artificial objects currently in heliocentric orbit, but not intended to orbit or land on any planetary or satellite body. This list does not include upper stages from robotic missions (only the S-IVB upper stages from Apollo missions with astronauts are listed), objects in the Sun–Earth Lagrange points or objects that are escaping from the Solar System.

== United States ==
The United States has placed in heliocentric orbit:

- Pioneer 4 – Moon (1959)
- Ranger 3 – Moon (1962)
- Ranger 5 – Moon (1963)
- Mariner 2 – Venus (1962)
- Mariner 3 – Intended for Mars, communication lost when launch shroud failed to separate (1964)
- Mariner 4 – Mars (1964–1967)
- Mariner 5 – Venus (1967)
- Pioneer 5, Pioneer 6, Pioneer 7, Pioneer 8, and Pioneer 9 – Sun (1966–1969)
- S-IVB for Apollo 8 (1968)
- S-IVB for Apollo 9 (1969)
- S-IVB and LM Snoopy (ascent stage) for Apollo 10 (1969)
- S-IVB for Apollo 11 (1969)
- Mariner 6 and Mariner 7 – Mars (1969)
- S-IVB for Apollo 12 (1969) – temporarily recaptured in Earth orbit 2002, escaped again 2003
- ICE – Comets Giocabinni-Zinner and Halley (1974–1987)
- Mariner 10 – Venus and Mercury (1974–1975)
- Mars Observer (1992) – Intended for Mars, failed prior to orbital insertion (1993)
- Protective cover of Cassini CDA instrument (1997)
- Stardust – Comet Wild 2 (1999–2006)
- Genesis – Solar wind sample mission (2001–2004)
- CONTOUR – Intended to flyby several comets, failed after launch (2002), seen as three separate fragments
- Spitzer Space Telescope (2003–2020)
- Deep Impact – Comet Tempel 1
- STEREO-A and STEREO-B (2006–2016)
- Kepler Mission (2009–2018)
- TAGSAM head cover – jettisoned from OSIRIS-REx (2018)
- MarCO-A and MarCO-B – CubeSat relays for InSight (2018–2019)
- Parker Solar Probe (2018–present)
- Lucy, various orbits between Earth gravity-assists and Jupiter's Trojans (2021–present)
- LICIACube (ASI) – CubeSat flyby of Didymos system (2021–2022)
- CubeSat for Solar Particles, intended to study Sun, but contact was lost in an hour (2022)
- Team Miles, intended to test technologies, but contact never established (2022)
- BioSentinel (2022–present)
- Near-Earth Asteroid Scout, was intended to conduct an asteroid flyby, but contact never established (2022)

On Apollos 8 and 10–17, each S-IVB upper stage jettisoned four sections of a truncated conical adapter that supported the Apollo service module and (except for Apollo 8) enclosed the Apollo Lunar Module. These panels are in heliocentric orbit, including those from Apollos 13–17 whose S-IVBs impacted the Moon, as the S-IVBs jettisoned them before maneuvering themselves into lunar impact trajectories. The panels continued on lunar flyby trajectories into heliocentric orbit. (The adapter panels on Apollo 9 were jettisoned in Earth orbit before the S-IVB burned into an Earth escape trajectory. They eventually decayed.)

U.S.-based commercial spaceflight companies have placed in heliocentric orbit:

- Elon Musk's Tesla Roadster with Falcon Heavy second stage (2018)
- Odin (Brokkr-2); flyby of 2022 OB5, but failed due to communication and tumbling issues (2025)
- Blue Origin launched NASA's ESCAPADE satellites with New Glenn second stage going into heliocentric orbit.

== Soviet Union or Russian Federation ==
The Soviet Union or the Russian Federation has placed in heliocentric orbit:

- Luna 1 – Intended to crash on Moon the first one in heliocentric orbit (1959)
- Venera 1 – Intended for Venus, communication lost en route (1961)
- Mars 1 – Intended for Mars, communication lost en route (1962)
- Zond 2 – Intended for Mars, communication lost en route (1964)
- Luna 6 – Intended to land on Moon, but missed (1965)
- Zond 3 – Moon (far side) and interplanetary space (1965)
- Venera 2 – Venus (1966)
- Mars 4 – Intended to orbit Mars, but retrorocket failed, mission partial success (1974)
- Mars 6 coast stage – Mars (1974)
- Mars 7 coast stage – Mars (1974)
- Mars 7 lander – Intended to land on Mars, but missed planet (1974)
- Venera 11 cruise stage – Venus (1978)
- Venera 12 cruise stage – Venus (1978)
- Venera 13 cruise stage – Venus (1982)
- Venera 14 cruise stage – Venus (1982)
- Vega 1 – Venus and Halley's Comet (1984–1986)
- Vega 2 – Venus and Halley's Comet (1984–1986)
- Phobos 1 – Intended for Mars and moon Phobos, communication lost en route (1988)

== European Space Agency (ESA) ==
The European Space Agency has placed in heliocentric orbit:

- Helios 1 (joint U.S./Germany) – Sun (1975–1985), launched on a US Titan III
- Helios 2 (joint U.S./Germany) – Sun (1976–1979)
- Giotto mission – Halley's Comet (1985–1992)
- Ulysses (joint U.S./ESA) – Jupiter and Sun's north and south poles (1990–2009)
- Gaia mission (2013-2025)

== Japan ==
Japan has placed in heliocentric orbit:

- Sakigake – Halley's Comet (1985–1999)
- Suisei – Halley's Comet (1985–1991)
- Nozomi – Intended for Mars, but retrorocket failed (1998–2003)
- MINERVA mini-lander – Intended for asteroid Itokawa but missed (2005)
- IKAROS – Venus flyby
- DCAM1 and DCAM2 – Ejected from IKAROS (2010)
- SHIN-EN – failed mission to Venus
- SHIN-EN 2 – amateur radio satellite, material demonstration (possibly active)
- ARTSAT2:DESPATCH – Deep space artwork (2014)

== China ==
China has placed in heliocentric orbit:

- Chang'e 2 – asteroid 4179 Toutatis flyby

== See also ==
- List of extraterrestrial orbiters
- List of artificial objects leaving the Solar System
- Human presence in space
- List of objects at Lagrange points
