= Human outpost =

Human habitats located in environments inhospitable for humans

Human outposts are artificially-created, controlled human habitats located in environments inhospitable for humans, such as on the ocean floor, in the Antarctic, in outer space, or on another planet, as in the challenges to live on Mars.

The logistics and difficulties inherent in such ventures have been heavily explored in science fiction.

== Outposts by environment ==
=== Polar ===
Polar research stations have been built and advanced by many states and for many purposes. For more see the articles about research stations in Antarctica and Arctic drifting ice stations.

=== Under sea ===
NASA trains astronauts in an underwater habitat, to simulate living and working in the International Space Station. They conduct scientific research on the human body and coral reefs, and build undersea structures to simulate space station assembly spacewalk tasks. The program is also being used to study how isolation affects human behaviour, to prepare for the first human outposts on the Moon and Mars.

=== Outer space ===
The Salyut 1 space station in low Earth orbit was the first human outpost in space. The International Space Station and Tiangong space station are the two functional human outposts in space, after China de-orbited its Tiangong-2 in 2019.

NanoRacks, after finalizing its contract with NASA, and after winning NextSTEPs Phase II award, is now developing its concept Independence-1 (previously known as Ixion), the first 'outpost' in NanoRacks' Space Outpost Program, which would turn spent rocket tanks into a habitable living area, often known as a wet workshop.

Planning and design for Lunar and Martian outposts is underway.

== In fiction ==
Human outposts in other worlds are a common motif in science fiction, whether established and occupied solely by humans or in cooperation – or competition – with alien species. The setting may be another planet, Earth-like or otherwise; or a spaceship large enough to house a city.

== Similar concepts ==
- Research station – Facility for scientific research
- Observatory – Location used for observing terrestrial or celestial events
- Space habitat – Type of space station, intended as a permanent settlement
- Spaceport – Location used to launch and receive spacecraft
- Ground station – Terrestrial radio station for communication with spacecraft
- Observation post – Position from which soldiers can watch enemy movements
- Military base – Facility directly owned and operated by or for the military
- Waypoint – Point on a route of travel
- Mountain pass – Route through a mountain range or over a ridge
- Base camp – Activity involving ascending mountains
- Caravanserei – Type of roadside inn
- Stage station – Place of rest provided for stagecoach travelers
- Way station – Pause during scheduled transportation
- Layover – Pause during scheduled transportation
- Roadhouse (premises) – Mixed-use premises typically built on or near a major road
- Shelter (building) – Architectural structure providing protection
- Mission (station) – Organized effort to spread Christianity
- Diplomatic mission – Representatives of one state in another
- Legation – Antiquated type of diplomatic mission with lower rank than an embassy
- Bridgehead – Strategically important position on a river crossing which enemy forces seek to control
- Crossroads village – term for a settlement situated at a crossroads
- Fuelling station – Facility for dispensing coal or oil for vehicles and power plants
- Railway town – Settlement developed when building a railway
- Special economic zone – Geographical region in which business and trade laws are different from the rest of the country
- Free economic zone – Geographic area where economic activity between and within countries is less regulated
- Exclusive economic zone – Adjacent sea zone in which a state has special rights
- Free-trade area – Regional trade agreement
- Trading post – Area where economic activity between peoples is less regulated
- Factory (trading post) – Transshipment zone (5th- to 19th-century name)
- Entrepôt – Hub for commercial activity
- Colony – Territory governed by another country
- Mill town – Settlement that developed around one or more mills or factories
- Mining community – Community that houses miners
- Industrial park – Area for development of industry
- Border outpost – outpost maintained by a sovereign state on its border, usually one of a series placed at regular intervals, to watch over and safeguard its border with a neighboring state
- Outpost (military) – Military post
- Station (frontier defensive structure) – defensible residence constructed on the American frontier during the late 18th and early 19th century
- Drillship – Vessel fitted for offshore drilling
- Oil platform – Offshore ocean structure with oil drilling and related facilities
- Kibbutz – Collective settlements in Israel
- Development town – Israeli towns established to house new immigrants
- Underwater habitat – Human habitable underwater enclosure filled with breathable gas
- Whaling station – Hunting of whales
- Fortification – Military defensive construction
- Castle – Fortified residential structure of medieval Europe
- Bailey (castle) – Fortified yard in a medieval castle
- Outwork – Type of fortification
- Burgus – Fortification of late Roman imperial times
- Guardhouse – Building to house security personnel and equipment
- Tower – Structure with height greater than width
- Lighthouse – Structure designed to emit light to aid navigation
- Broadcast relay station – Repeater transmitter
- Refugee camp – Temporary settlement for refugees

== See also ==
- Frontier – Area near or beyond a boundary
- Frontier thesis – Argument by historian Frederick Jackson Turner
- Border – Geographic boundaries of political entity
- No-go area – Area where authorities are unable to enforce law or sovereignty
- Terra nullius – International law term for unclaimed land
- No-mans land – Strip of land between wartime trenches
- Exile – Event by which a person is forced away from home
