= List of Planetes episodes =

Cover art for the volume 1 compilation DVD of Planetes released by Bandai Entertainment

This is a list of episodes of the Japanese animated TV series Planetes (プラネテス, Puranetesu; Ancient Greek: πλάνητες "Wanderers").

== Overview ==
It began airing its 26-episode run on NHK BS-2 on October 4, 2003, and ended on February 23, 2004. Produced and animated by Sunrise, it was directed by Gorō Taniguchi and scripted by Ichirō Ōkouchi (both of whom would later reunite in 2006 to work on the Sunrise original production Code Geass). The anime began development and production before the end of the manga serialization. In the beginning and middle of the series, the writing and production staff only had the first three volumes of the manga as source. In order to fill the entire 26-episode run of the anime, new characters, new settings and new relationships between characters were made in order to increase dramatic tension, reinforce themes introduced in the manga, and introduce new themes that were compatible with the manga. While the manga deals more with existential themes, and humanity's relationship with space, the anime further expands the political elements of the story.

The music of Planetes is a mixture of traditional orchestral music, supplemented by chorals, several uses of a theremin, and traditional Japanese woodwinds (e.g. Shakuhachi). The music score was composed by Kōtarō Nakagawa and produced by Victor Entertainment. The opening theme is "Dive in the Sky" by Mikio Sakai, and the ending themes are "Wonderful Life" by Mikio Sakai for episodes 1-25 and "Planetes" by Hitomi Kuroishi for episode 26. There are two insert songs, "A Secret of the Moon" by Hitomi Kuroishi, used in various episodes, and "Thanks My Friend" by Mikio Sakai used in episode 13.

== Episodes ==
No.	Title	Directed by	Original release date
1	"Outside the Atmosphere"; Transliteration: "Taiki no Soto de" (Japanese: 大気の外で)	Masaki Kitamura; Gorō Taniguchi	October 4, 2003
Ai Tanabe arrives for her new job with Technora aboard the ISPV 7 space station, and comes to find that she is assigned to the Debris Section, derogatorily deemed the "Half Section". She is introduced to the members, who seem unorganized and awkward upon first impression. She begins training in extra-vehicular activity with Hachirota "Hachimaki" Hoshino as her instructor. Tanabe and Hachimaki's first mission together is to deorbit a memorial plate to prevent it from colliding with a military satellite. Tanabe initially believes that the plate should be spared because it is a message of peace, but is swayed when she realizes the plate is really just propaganda.
2	"Like a Dream"; Transliteration: "Yume no Yō na" (Japanese: 夢のような)	Yoshimitsu Ōhashi	October 11, 2003
Hachimaki is made fun of by his co-workers in the Debris Section and Technora because he dreams of getting his own spaceship by winning the lottery. Tanabe continues her zero gravity training with Hachimaki. Kho Cheng-Shin, Hachimaki's friend, celebrates his promotion to orbital shuttle co-pilot. Tanabe and Hachimaki are later sent on a debris retrieval mission to recover a derelict satellite. However, Tanabe accidentally activates its maneuvering system and sends it on a collision course with Cheng-Shin's orbital shuttle. Hachimaki risks his life to save the passengers by manually activating the satellite's engines.
3	"Return Trajectory"; Transliteration: "Kikan Kidō" (Japanese: 帰還軌道)	Megumi Yamamoto	October 18, 2003
Life insurance salespeople swarm the ISPV 7 while members of the Debris Section write their annual wills. Tanabe is annoyed that Hachimaki is not taking his will seriously enough. During a routine debris collection mission, Tanabe and Hachimaki, along with Yuri Mihairokov, recover a space coffin containing a famous astronaut. Although the astronaut's daughter wants him to be buried in outer space since he never visited his family in life, Tanabe believes that he should be valued as a family member and returned to Earth to be buried. His daughter changes her mind when she sees that he was buried with a picture of his family, and asks that he be brought to Earth.
4	"Part of the Job"; Transliteration: "Shigoto Toshite" (Japanese: 仕事として)	Tatsuya Igarashi	October 25, 2003
Colin Clifford, the spoiled son of the current INTO chairman, visits the ISPV 7 and observes a debris hauling mission with the Debris Section. Claire Rondo, a member of the Control Section that is supervising Colin, tells the crew to retrieve Colin's camera, which he carelessly left attached to a derelict satellite after visiting it as a space tourist, much to Hachimaki's frustration. Fee Carmichael volunteers herself to do the job after it becomes clear Hachimaki might physically assault Colin. After the mission, Colin and his friends mock Hachimaki about the low status of debris collecting, prompting the other members of the Debris Section to defend Hachimaki and humiliate Colin.
5	"Fly Me to the Moon"; Transliteration: "Furai Mī Tu Za Mūn" (Japanese: フライ·ミー·トゥ·ザ·ムーン)	Hiroshi Ishiodori	November 1, 2003
Hachimaki, Tanabe, and Fee decide to go to the Moon for their holiday, and happen to end up on a lunar ferry co-piloted by Cheng-Shin. On the trip over, Tanabe loses her wallet. After confusing an actor for a thug, Hachimaki fills in for a movie scene, not long before the film equipment is confiscated because the film crew didn't have permits. A mother and father are planning to commit suicide on the ferry and to take their daughter with them, because they are deeply in debt. A pickpocket is reported to have stolen Tanabe's wallet and the poison intended for the daughter. The pickpocket takes the daughter hostage, but with Cheng-Shin's help, Hachimaki rescues her. The girl's parents find a renewed will to live from the experience.
6	"The Lunar Flying Squirrels"; Transliteration: "Tsuki no Musasabi" (Japanese: 月のムササビ)	Masaki Kitamura	November 8, 2003
Hachimaki takes Tanabe to a rundown hotel on the Moon. Unfortunately, the surrounding neighbors are a group of wannabe ninjas who chase after Hachimaki due to a misunderstanding. The neighbors apologize to Hachimaki and welcome Tanabe to the hotel, where they all reveal that they are currently looking for job. At a nearby fancy hotel, a father sets up a marriage arrangement for his daughter (formerly the wife of one of the ninjas) with Hachimaki, but a fire starts and Hachimaki helps her evacuate from her room. The wannabe ninjas enter the hotel and find Hachimaki and the daughter, and with a combined effort, they all manage to parachute down from the hotel.
7	"Extraterrestrial Girl"; Transliteration: "Chikyūgai Shōjo" (Japanese: 地球外少女)	Yoshimitsu Ōhashi	November 15, 2003
After injuring his leg parachuting from the hotel fire, Hachimaki must stay in a hospital on the Moon for a week to recover. He meets Harry Roland, a veteran astronaut who is initially in an adjacent hospital bed, but later goes missing from the hospital. Hachimaki also meets a young girl named Nono, and tells her what it is like to live on Earth. After his release, Fee drives Hachimaki to the airport. On their way there, they find Roland on the side of the road, and he reveals he has leukemia before he passes away from decompression sickness. Returning to the hospital, Hachimaki is surprised to find that Nono is a twelve-year-old Lunarian, a person born on the Moon.
8	"A Place to Cling to" Transliteration: "Yorubeki Basho" (Japanese: 拠るべき場所)	Megumi Yamamoto	November 22, 2003
Arvind "Robbie" Lavie suspects that Fee is having an affair with Dolph Azalia, the Technora Second Division director, and informs the other members of the Debris Section about it. However, Fee is actually being promoted to assistant chief of the Control Section. Debris Section soon discover this. The next debris retrieval mission is to collect some experimental material that is invisible to radar and expands when heated, requiring collection at night. Although debris that is unseen by radar will be difficult to haul in at night, the rest of the members of the Debris Section take the opportunity to do this on their own without Fee to prove to her that they can function without her. When Fee hears word that they are struggling, she manages to guide them to success, and she later decides to turn down the promotion.
9	"Regrets"; Transliteration: "Kokoro Nokori" (Japanese: 心のこり)	Tatsuya Igarashi	November 29, 2003
Gigalt Gangaragash, Hachimaki's extra-vehicular activity former instructor, visits the Debris Section as part of a safety inspection. Hachimaki asks Tanabe if she is seeing anyone, and she replies that she is not. Hachimaki formerly dated Claire, much to Tanabe's surprise. Gigalt explains to Tanabe that Hachimaki wears his headband when he is focused. On a debris hauling run supervised by Gigalt, the crew encounters a group performing illegal debris dumping. Hachimaki and Gigalt try to stop them, but Hachimaki becomes glued to the vessel, while Gigalt is rescued by Tanabe after his suit thrusters become damaged. Hakim Ashmead, also one of Gigalt's former pupils who now works for the Orbital Security Agency (OSA), arrives to arrest the illegal haulers and save Hachimaki. Tanabe finds out that Gigalt has cancer while fixing his thrusters, and is told to not tell Hachimaki.
10	"A Sky of Stardust"; Transliteration: "Kuzuboshi no Sora" (Japanese: 屑星の空)	Kazuya Murata	December 6, 2003
Hachimaki notices that both Tanabe and Yuri have been acting strange lately. Tanabe is preoccupied with her discovery of Gigalt having cancer, both worried that Hachimaki may suffer the same fate and concerned about having to keep it a secret from him. Philippe Myers later reveals that Yuri was aboard a sub-orbital shuttle with his wife, who was killed after orbital debris struck it. On a routine debris retrieval mission, Yuri finds the only keepsake of his deceased wife, a compass she brought as a good luck charm, which he has been searching for ever since the accident. However, because he was forced to move into the path of debris to retrieve it he is struck, knocked unconscious, and forced into the Earth's atmosphere. Both Hachimaki and Tanabe are forced to risk their lives to save him.
11	"Boundary Line"; Transliteration: "Baundarī Rain" (Japanese: バウンダリー·ライン)	Yoshimitsu Ōhashi	December 13, 2003
An engineer from an impoverished country called El-Tanica comes to the ISPV 7 to have his new spacesuit tested. No company or department will agree to test his unusual suit because of the lowly status of his home country until the Debris Section volunteer to help him with the basic testing procedures, monitored by Claire, who is revealed as a native of El-Tanica. During the final set of tests, in outer space proper, Hakim receives orders from INTO to arrest the engineer and return him to El-Tanica under protective custody. Hachimaki manages to buy time to complete the final tests, which are all successful. Although Claire is able to prevent Hakim from arresting the engineer, the engineer accepts being taken into custody, having accomplished his goal of proving that even third-world countries can reach space.
12	"A Modest Request"; Transliteration: "Sasayaka naru Negai o" (Japanese: ささやかなる願いを)	Akira Yoshimura	December 20, 2003
Fee and Yuri take the Toy Box to the Moon for routine repairs. On her way to the smoking room there, Fee narrowly escapes a terrorist attack. She is told that there have been bombings set off by the Space Defense Front (SDF), a terrorist organization, in various smoking rooms to stop human development in space. Much to Fee's frustration, many of the smoking rooms on the Moon are being torn down. Meanwhile, Tanabe goes on for her date with Cheng-Shin, after she overhears her friend, Lucy Askam, seemingly asking out Hachimaki. However, she is really asking Hachimaki to help her date Cheng-Shin by becoming Tanabe's girlfriend. Fee is again unable to have a smoke after another terrorist attack in a nearby Moon city. Hachimaki and Tanabe accidentally damage her smoking chamber on the ISPV 7, further denying her the ability to smoke. Shortly after, during a debris mission, the SDF prepares to send a large missile towards the ISPV 7, in order to initiate the Kessler syndrome. Fee realizes that her newly repaired smoking chamber will be destroyed, and retaliates by driving the Toy Box straight into the missile, deflecting it into the Earth's atmosphere and destroying the Toy Box in the process. After saving the ISPV 7 from destruction, Fee safely lands on Earth, and is happily able to enjoy a cigarette.
13	"Scenery With a Rocket"; Transliteration: "Roketto no aru Fūkei" (Japanese: ロケットのある風景)	Masami Furukawa	January 10, 2004
Since the Toy Box has been destroyed, the Debris Section go on a holiday on Earth. Tanabe and Yuri accompany Hachimaki on a visit to his mother, Haruko Hoshino. At the household, they meet Hachimaki's brother, Kyutaro Hoshino, who is a rocketry enthusiast. Yuri helps Kyutaro modify his home-built rocket and then helps him conduct a test launch at the beach. Hachimaki and Tanabe, after meeting an old friend of Hachimaki's at the grocery store who mistakes Tanabe for Hachimaki's girlfriend, stop for a walk on the beach. They almost kiss, but are interrupted by Kyutaro's malfunctioning rocket. Fee informs Hachimaki that the Debris Section has received a new debris hauling ship. Hachimaki makes Kyutaro apologize to Yuri for breaking his compass during the failed launch, but Yuri thanks Kyutaro for doing so, as the destruction of the compass has helped him realize how to move on with his life and not dwell on the past. As Hachimaki, Tanabe, and Yuri fly back to the ISPV 7, Kyutaro successfully launches his rocket with Yuri's compass in the nosecone.
14	"Turning Point"; Transliteration: "Tāningu Pointo" (Japanese: ターニング·ポイント)	Tatsuya Igarashi	January 17, 2004
Tanabe and Hachimaki hesitate to realize their feelings for each other, especially after Robbie informs the Debris Section that office romance is prohibited because of the risk of demotion or reassignment. Hachimaki accidentally insults Tanabe while trying to prove he isn't in a relationship, and she rejects him multiple times. On a test flight of the new Toy Box, the Debris Section become embroiled in company intrigue, as they choose to help a scientist move an orbital research facility away from a meteoroid against the will of the Technora Third Division manager, whose daughter was involved in an office romance with the scientist. After saving the facility, the scientist thanks the Debris Section for their help, and Tanabe is impressed with Hachimaki's handling of the situation. Hachimaki asks Tanabe to be his girlfriend, and she responds by kissing him.
15	"In Her Case"; Transliteration: "Kanojo no Baai" (Japanese: 彼女の場合)	Masaki Kitamura	January 24, 2004
The Debris Section worries about office temp staffer Edelgard "Edel" Rivera and her serious attitude despite being a non-contracted employee at Technora. During a conference meeting, Gigalt's heart gives out and is sent to the hospital upon Hakim's request. Hachimaki seems to be struggling on his first date with Tanabe, and they decide to check into a hotel for privacy. After being contacted by an old acquaintance named Sasha, Edel sets off to meet him, although she is delayed as Sasha wrote down the wrong room number. Hachimaki and Tanabe find Sasha in their hotel room, and soon learn that Edel used to be his wife. Edel threatens to shoot Sasha because she was abused by him, but Tanabe and Hachimaki intervene. When Sasha tries to escape, Hakim arrives and arrests Sasha because he was one of three criminals being tracked by the OSA.
16	"Ignition"; Transliteration: "Igunisshon" (Japanese: イグニッション)	Kazuya Murata	January 31, 2004
Hachimaki is stuck adrift in space in the middle of a solar flare, yet miraculously survives. However, due to the mental trauma sustained he may be grounded for the rest of his life. He undergoes rehabilitation tests for two weeks on the Moon in order to overcome his fear of going into outer space, with Tanabe monitoring his progress. During his last of his tests, Hachimaki sees a hallucination of himself in space, who tells him to give up being an astronaut and return to Earth. Convinced he will be grounded, Hachimaki sneaks out of the hospital, planning to commit suicide like Roland. Tanabe, Yuri, and Fee find him outside the hospital, readying himself to die alone. His friends bring him to the testing site of the Jovian exploration ship Von Braun and show him the Tandem Mirror Engine, the most powerful engine ever built, which inspires him to overcome his trauma.
17	"His Reasons"; Transliteration: "Sore Yue no Kare" (Japanese: それゆえの彼)	Yoshimitsu Ōhashi	February 7, 2004
Claire has been reassigned to monitor the flight crew and assist Cheng-Shin because of a string of mistakes. The head designer of the Jupiter Exploration Mission, Werner Locksmith goes to visit the Debris Section to speak with Hachimaki. He is in search of Goro Hoshino, Hachimaki's father, who is revealed to be a veteran of several missions to Mars. Locksmith hopes to recruit Goro as Chief Engineer for the Von Braun because of his experience with fusion engines. After he leaves, Goro comes out of hiding, telling Hachimaki that all he wants is to settle down back on Earth. Later, all flight departures to the Moon are canceled because the research laboratory containing the Tandem Mirror Engine has exploded. Locksmith's practical attitude toward the accident convinces Goro to sign onto the Von Braun.
18	"Debris Section, Last Day"; Transliteration: "Deburi ka, Saigo no Hi" (Japanese: デブリ課, 最期の日)	Megumi Yamamoto	February 14, 2004
Dolph is replaced as director of the Technora Second Division, and the new director wants to shut down the Debris Section. Robbie is offered a high position in the Second Division, which convinces him that he will finally be able to support his family. The crew of the Toy Box go on one last mission and they find a secret INTO orbital mine disguised as debris. Although Robbie does not want to risk his new position, the crew sends Hachimaki to shut down the mine. The new Second Division director prepares to shut down the Toy Box remotely to protect the secrecy of the mine, but Philippe and Edel fight back and prevent the shutdown. Going against the new director's orders, Robbie operates the manual controls, shuts down the orbital mine, and saves the rest of the crew. Shortly after, Hachimaki decides to resign from the Debris Section to pursue becoming a crewman on the Von Braun.
19	"Endings Are Always..."; Transliteration: "Owari wa Itsumo..." (Japanese: 終わりは いつも...)	Tatsuya Igarashi	February 21, 2004
The Debris Section has won a reprieve after their discovery and destruction of the classified INTO mine. On Earth, Hachimaki and Cheng-Shin both apply to be candidates to join the Von Braun's crew after a series of tests hosted by Locksmith. Hachimaki has entered the preliminary round of tests, while Cheng-Shin is exempt from them because of his employment at Technora. Forced to live homeless and unemployed, Hachimaki finds out that Hakim will also be a candidate, and has also quit his job at the OSA. Cheng-Shin asks Hachimaki to contact Tanabe, but he keeps putting it off. The final test of the preliminary round is to restore their life support system while in orbit within ten minutes, using a pool as a simulation. As Hachimaki and Cheng-Shin take the test with two other candidates, one of the candidates accidentally cuts off one of her oxygen tubes and starts to fall to the bottom of the pool. Hachimaki, ignoring the situation, proceeds and passes the test, while Cheng-Shin and the other candidate rescue her. Before Cheng-Shin wishes Hachimaki well for passing the test on his own, the latter expresses his anger at the fact that the former took the test without truly giving it his all.
20	"Tentative Steps"; Transliteration: "Tamerai Gachi no" (Japanese: ためらいがちの)	Masaki Kitamura	February 28, 2004
Claire has been demoted from the Control Section to the Debris Section, where she replaces Hachimaki and is trained by Tanabe, who is upset about Hachimaki's absence. Cheng-Shin forces himself onto Tanabe, claiming that she should leave Hachimaki because he wants to be alone. Hachimaki and Hakim join two other candidates in the second round of tests, where they are isolated in a pod for ten days, and they must assemble a model of the Von Braun before they are released. However, the main power unexpectedly goes out on the last day, jeopardizing the isolation pod's power and air supply. The air supply will only last for three people, so the four of them must think of something to survive. Hakim considers killing one of them to save the rest. After the test is over, the rescue squad realize that the four lowered their body temperature to minimize their oxygen consumption, allowing them all to survive.
21	"Tandem Mirror"; Transliteration: "Tandemu Mirā" (Japanese: タンデム·ミラー)	Kazuya Murata	March 6, 2004
The Debris Section has been assigned to the Moon for a month to help collect debris from the Tandem Mirror Drive disaster, with Colin and Lucy tagging along on the flight over. Colin is now an inspector working for INTO. For the third round of tests, Hachimaki and Hakim will train aboard the Von Braun for six months as finalists. Hachimaki is called by Tanabe, but he hangs up on her after explaining that he has decided to make his own life decisions. Claire attacks Tanabe's ideals, claiming she would never be able to save anyone with love. Hachimaki is constantly haunted by visions of himself, which try to convince him to give up on the Von Braun and live with Tanabe on Earth. Hachimaki later realizes that Hakim is planning to sabotage the Von Braun's engine. Hachimaki does all he can to stop Hakim, including threatening to shoot him. However, Hachimaki doesn't have the will to go through with killing Hakim, who has already planted a bomb. The engine is damaged but not destroyed, and Hakim escapes.
22	"Exposure"; Transliteration: "Bakuro" (Japanese: 暴露)	Akira Yoshimura	March 13, 2004
Philippe, Robbie, and Edel are welcomed by the Debris Section stationed on the Moon. Meanwhile, Hachimaki is called to the Moon for questioning about Hakim's social status and his possible connection with the Space Defense Front. He finds out that Claire may be associated with this since she has become Hakim's girlfriend. Later that night, Hachimaki later comes across Philippe, Robbie, and Edel, who are all happy to see him. He tries to visit Tanabe at her hotel, but is distracted by one of the lunar ninjas. He learns that all the ninjas (except the one he is talking to) were employed at the Tandem Mirror research lab and died in the accident. He goes to the hospital and sees Nono in the lobby. She gives him a camera before she leaves for her checkup, which plays back a recording of Gigalt, revealing that he has died from cancer. When Tanabe catches up to Hachimaki, he is surprised that she already knew about Gigalt's struggle with cancer. She tries to explain, but his declining mental health and the visions of himself have convinced him that he is alone in the world, and no one truly deserves his love.
23	"Debris Cluster"; Transliteration: "Deburi no Mure" (Japanese: デブリの群れ)	Yoshimitsu Ōhashi	March 20, 2004
As the final preparations are being made for the Von Braun's maiden voyage to Jupiter, Tanabe boards the Von Braun with the help of Colin and Lucy, with the goal of helping Hachimaki out of his self-imposed isolation. The Space Defense Front makes a bold attempt at interrupting an ongoing INTO summit by taking control of the Von Braun, and jamming all communications in orbit. They take Dolph hostage and force him to shut down the engine, and the Von Braun is redirected onto a collision course with the largest lunar city, which is used as leverage to force the INTO council to accept the SDF's demands. During a concurrent debris mission, Claire and Hakim lock Yuri and Fee in a room and tie them up, then commandeer the Toy Box to board the Von Braun and neutralize all resistance aboard. Tanabe is separated from Lucy and Colin during the gunfight. Goro is unable to restart the Von Braun's engine. Claire is wounded during a gunfight with some of the crew candidates. Hachimaki finds Hakim in Locksmith's office and points a gun to his face, determined to shoot him this time.
24	"Love"; Transliteration: "Ai" (Japanese: 愛)	Megumi Yamamoto	April 3, 2004
The Space Defense Front is about to crash the Von Braun into the largest city on the Moon. Tanabe finds a badly wounded Claire and takes her to an escape pod. Yuri and Fee free themselves aboard the Toy Box and attempt to push the Von Braun away from the city with the help of Cheng-Shin. The SDF plan is aborted at the last minute when INTO caves in to the terrorists' demands, and the Von Braun manages to restore its orbit. Tanabe and Claire crash into the Moon, but are unable to send out a distress call. Tanabe is forced to walk with Claire on her back for ten hours to reach a staffed communications outpost before they run out of oxygen. Fee and Yuri ask Colin and Lucy, who are in shock from the gunfight, where Tanabe is. On the Moon, Tanabe tries to prove to Claire that love can save at least one life, but after she realizes both that she is running low on oxygen and that Hachimaki never loved her, she almost decides to sacrifice her ideals, and Claire, to save herself.
25	"The Lost"; Transliteration: "Madoibito" (Japanese: 惑い人)	Tatsuya Igarashi	April 10, 2004
Six months have passed following the Von Braun crisis. Hachimaki sinks into a deep depression, isolates himself, and nearly dies on the lunar surface. Dolph sends Hachimaki and Goro back to Earth for a holiday, much to Locksmith's surprise. Hachimaki makes a chance stop on the ISPV 7 to visit the Debris Section, where he finds Tanabe's will and Philippe and Robbie give him Tanabe's home address. After spending time with his family but failing to recover, he discovers that Tanabe didn't write anything in her will. This moves him to try and drive to Tanabe on his motorcycle to visit her one last time, but another vision of himself convinces himself he is alone, and causes him to crash. He survives, but in the process realizes that he has been looking at things the wrong way. Soon after, he encounters Tanabe, who is now temporarily paralyzed from oxygen deprivation. After she tells him about what happened to her and Claire, he shares with her of his belief that everything in the world is connected to space, and they share a moment together.
26	"And the Days We Chance Upon..."; Transliteration: "Soshite Meguri au Hibi" (Japanese: そして巡りあう日々)	Masaki Kitamura; Gorō Taniguchi	April 17, 2004
Tanabe and Hachimaki remain in contact, and she expresses her desire to return to space. Hachimaki and Cheng-Shin visit Claire in prison, where she says that she saved Tanabe on the Moon by signaling a shuttle bus, somehow bringing herself not to abandon Tanabe. Hachimaki says it may have been because she was moved by Tanabe's devotion to her ideals. Dolph refuses to return to Technora and remains at his position of president of Galileo Development, following the success of the Jupiter Project. Hakim meets Nono on the lunar surface, where she convinces him not to commit another terrorist attack. After months of intensive physical therapy and a full recovery, Tanabe visits the ISPV 7, and meets Hachimaki there. The members of the Debris Section, as well as some other friends, are happy to see them. Hachimaki and Tanabe go out into space to spend some quality time together, and there he proposes to her. Months later, Hachimaki finally leaves for Jupiter with the Von Braun. As Tanabe watches on, it is implied that she is pregnant.

== See also ==
- Planetes
- List of Planetes chapters
