= To the Moon =

To the Moon may refer to:

== Film and television ==
- To the Moon, a 2012 short film by Damian Harris
- To the Moon (2021 film), an American psychological thriller
- To the Moon (2024 film), a Canadian comedy
- To the Moon (TV series), a 2025 South Korean romantic comedy series
- To the Moon, an announced TV series about the 2021 GameStop short squeeze

== Music ==
- To the Moon World Tour, a 2022 concert tour by Kid Cudi

=== Songs ===
- "To the Moon" (song), by Jnr Choi, 2021
- "To the Moon", by Alok and Illenium, 2025
- "To the Moon", by Bootleg Rascal featuring Ivan Ooze, 2018
- "To the Moon", by Hans Zimmer from the Fateh film soundtrack, 2025
- "To the Moon", by Kyle from Light of Mine, 2018
- "To the Moon", by Meghan Trainor from Timeless, 2024
- "To the Moon", by Miguel from All I Want Is You, 2010
- "To the Moon", by Sara Groves from Add to the Beauty, 2005
- "To the Moon", by Sweet Trip from You Will Never Know Why, 2009
- "To the Moon", by We Are Defiance from Trust in Few, 2011

== Video games ==
- To the Moon (video game), a 2011 adventure game

== See also ==
- "To the Moon, Alice!", a catchphrase in the 1950s American sitcom The Honeymooners
- To the Moon and Back (disambiguation)
- Fly Me to the Moon (disambiguation)
- Talking to the Moon (disambiguation)
