= To the Moon and Back =

To the Moon and Back can refer to:

== Film and television ==
- To the Moon and Back, a story by Etgar Keret, translated for The New Yorker in October 2016
- To the Moon and Back, a 2023 Thai romantic drama series was directed by Pawanrat Naksuriya

== Literature ==
- To the Moon and Back (book), a 2004 book by Jackie French and Bryan Sullivan
- To the Moon and Back, a 2016 documentary about the Dima Yakovlev Law
- To the Moon and Back (Karen Kingsbury book), a 2018 book by Karen Kingsbury

== Songs ==
- "To the Moon and Back" (Fever Ray song), 2017
- "To the Moon and Back" (Savage Garden song), 1996

== See also ==
- To the Moon (disambiguation)
