= Talking to the Moon (disambiguation) =

"Talking to the Moon" is a 2011 song by Bruno Mars.

Talking to the Moon may also refer to:

- "Talking to the Moon", a 1926 song by Billy Baskette and George A. Little
- "Talking to the Moon", a 1985 song by Charlie Daniels from the album Me and the Boys
- "Talking to the Moon", a 1982 song by Don Henley from the album I Can't Stand Still

== See also ==
- "Talkin' to the Moon", a 1986 song by Larry Gatlin & the Gatlin Brothers
- To the Moon (disambiguation)
