= Ride (2018 film) =

2018 American thriller film

- Film poster
- Directed by: Jeremy Ungar
- Written by: Jeremy Ungar
- Produced by: Sefton Fincham; Tyler Jackson; Keith Kjarval
- Starring: Bella Thorne; Jessie Usher; Will Brill
- Cinematography: Rob C. Givens
- Edited by: Kayla M. Emter
- Music by: Paul Haslinger
- Production company: Garden of Eden Entertainment
- Distributed by: RLJE Films
- Release date: October 5, 2018
- Running time: 76 minutes
- Country: United States
- Language: English

Ride is a 2018 American thriller film written and directed by Jeremy Ungar and starring Bella Thorne, Jessie Usher and Will Brill. It is Ungar's feature length directorial debut.

== Plot ==
Struggling actor James (Jessie Usher) pays his bills by driving people around Los Angeles for a ride-sharing service. James' shift starts out like any other, until he hits it off with a beautiful woman named Jessica (Bella Thorne) whom he picks up. He drops her off at a local place to which she invites him inside for a drink. He refuses as he already has his next fare. At his next pick-up destination, James meets the fast-talking Bruno (Will Brill), who has just suffered from a recent break-up with his girlfriend. He convinces James to invite Jessica along for a wild night out. They then head back to the club to find her but whilst James and Jessica talk inside, things take a shocking turn and Bruno drives off with the car to a random location. There he adjusts the doors and turns on the child locks. He heads back to pick up the two and they head off toward their destination.

After a few fun moments, Bruno suggests they rob a liquor store and shock them when he is armed with a gun. He has a twisted idea of fun and initiates a terrifying, white-knuckle ride that quickly spirals out of control. He instructs James to shoot the store clerk and steal a bottle of alcohol threatening to murder Jessica if he does not follow through. James follows through and shoots the clerk in the process. They head to the highway and drink some of the alcohol. Bruno instructs Jessica to drive, she switches the child lock off beforehand and attempts to escape with James but he tries to stall Bruno. Jessica tries to catch a bus passing by but heads back to the vehicle when she sees Bruno threatening to shoot James. As during the struggle Bruno dislocated James' shoulder, she is instructed to drive to the local pharmacy to get some things for James.

Whilst in the store, she steals the required items and sees the breaking news on TV which states that Bruno Anthony was a club owner that was murdered. To her shock the "Bruno" that they know is using fake identity. In the vehicle, the fake Bruno sedates James and pops his shoulder back into place. They head to a local drive thru and he gets them all a meal. It is finally James' turn to drive with Jessica in the front seat, they head to the fake Bruno's ex-girlfriend's house. James crashes the vehicle in the process and escapes with Jessica. They hide in a pool where they kiss. However they are eventually caught again. They all sit in the hot tub, which was their agenda from the beginning when they planned their "wild night out". Jessica mentions that the fake Bruno is not really Bruno Anthony and that the original is survived by his girlfriend, who was in fact the fake Bruno's ex-girlfriend. She states that he was indeed suffering from a break-up, but this had occurred a long time ago. In the midst of this James beats the fake Bruno with the alcohol bottle and takes his gun. He aims the gun at the fake Bruno's chest but leaves him to suffer. He and Jessica walk away, leaving the fake Bruno alone.

Unknown to James, the fake Bruno still has his phone and accepts a new ride request. He phones the passenger and addresses himself as "James", which indicates that another terrifying, white-knuckle ride is about to take place as the film ends.

== Cast ==
- Bella Thorne as Jessica
- Jessie Usher as James
- Will Brill as Bruno

== Production ==
The film was shot in Los Angeles.

== Release ==
In July 2018, it was announced that RLJE Films and Urban Movie Channel acquired North American distribution rights to the film. It was released via VOD and in limited theaters on October 5, 2018. Afterwards, it was released on DVD and Blu-Ray on December 4, 2018.

== Reception ==
The film has a 33% rating on Rotten Tomatoes. Alan Ng of Film Threat awarded the film a 5 out of 10. Mike Sprague of JoBlo.com gave the film a 7 out of 10.
