= List of Planetes characters =

This is a list of fictional characters from the manga and anime series Planetes.

== Toy Box Crew ==
Hachirota "Hachimaki" Hoshino (星野 八郎太, Hoshino Hachirōta)
Voiced by: Kazunari Tanaka (Japanese); Kirk Thornton (English)
Hachirota Hoshino is the protagonist of the series. Everyone simply calls him "Hachi" (Japanese for "eight" or "eighth") or "Hachimaki" (ハチマキ), "headband", because he wears one during his EVAs. His dream has always been to own his own spaceship, but between the cost of purchasing one and his low-paying, seemingly dead-end job, Hachi struggles with even deciding whether or not to pursue his dream. Hachi's father is a renowned engineer, a source of much ambivalence to Hachimaki. Much of Hachi's drive is summed up in "bigger, faster, and further". However, this drive makes him conflicted about his own relationship with space. Loud and brash, Hachi has difficulty expressing himself adequately, especially in romantic matters.
Ai Tanabe (田名部 愛, Tanabe Ai)
Voiced by: Satsuki Yukino (Japanese); Julie Ann Taylor (English)
Ai Tanabe is the newest member of the Debris Section. She is the adopted daughter of a death metal band leader turned engineer and an elementary school teacher. Tanabe did not speak until she was three years old. She is bright and earnest, but mostly unsure of herself. As a newcomer to space, the Debris Section and to extra-vehicular activity all at the same time, she has to slowly learn the ropes from everyone else. She believes that love, or "ai" (possibly a pun intended on her name being the Japanese word for love) is the solution to every problem. Kind and sweet, she is willing to do almost anything to help others. However, her kind spirit also masks a drive to become better than she is. After meeting her during the Orbital Security Audit, Gigalt gave her the affectionate nickname of "Angel".
Fee Carmichael (フィー·カーマイケル, Fī Kāmaikeru)
Voiced by: Ai Orikasa (Japanese); Wendee Lee (English)
Fee Carmichael is the American pilot of the "Toy Box", the debris-collecting ship used by the main characters. She was born in Richmond, Virginia, and the daughter of a prominent lawyer. Even more loud and brash than Hachi, Fee often becomes violent at others' actions and inaction, but she always means well. Being a heavy (and slightly ashamed) smoker, she has difficulty finding places to indulge her habit in space, as smoking is a strain on life support systems and is thereby restricted to designated smoking rooms. This often makes her quite irritable, especially after all smoking rooms are shut down as the SDF began planting bombs in them. In the anime, she is able to get around this with an enclosed personal "smoker's seat" (which is prone to inadvertent sabotage). Married with a young son, Fee lives in Florida when not in space, which is not very often. While working with the team, Gigalt gave her the nickname of "Turbolighter".
Yuri Mikhalkov (ユーリ·ミハイロコフ, Yūri Mihairokofu; Russian: Юрий Михалков, Yuri Mihalkov, Tokyopop spelling of surname is "Mihairokov")
Voiced by: Takehito Koyasu (Japanese); Jamieson Price (English)
Yuri Mikhalkov is the Russian member of the Debris team. Calm, stoic, kind and compassionate, Yuri often acts as the level head of the group. Several years before the events of the story, he and his wife were in a low-orbit craft traveling to England when a small bolt slammed into one of the ship's windows at high velocity, causing the plane to depressurize and make an emergency landing. Many died in the highly publicized incident, including Yuri's wife, who was never found. The incident and Yuri's desire to recover his wife's lost keepsake, a compass she wore around her neck, drives him to collect more debris. In the anime, Yuri and the Debris Section Office Staff are responsible for looking after the ISPV 7's resident animals. Gigalt apparently gave Yuri a nickname, though it is never spoken within the anime.

== Debris Section Office Staff ==
The Debris Section Office Staff only appear in the anime.

Philippe Myers

- Voiced by: Aikou Ogata (Japanese); Doug Stone (English)

The chief clerk of the Debris Section. He is overweight but jolly, and calls his co-workers by the first syllable of their names. At first glance, he seems like a bumbling stereotypical salaryman, however, when given the chance, shows heroic courage. His hair color changes throughout the series, from very light blonde to reddish-brown (It was revealed to be a wig in the final episode). His physical mannerisms throughout the series strongly suggest that he wears a hairpiece (and this is confirmed in the last episode of the anime). Gigalt gave him the nickname of "Marshmallow".

Arvind "Robbie" Lavie

- Voiced by: Tetsuo Gotō (Japanese); Steve Schatzberg (English)

The assistant chief clerk and self-described "Number 2" of the Debris Section who hails from India. He is a divorced father of seven children. He is portrayed as a trickster or prop comedian with a very flexible body. Seemingly obnoxious and opportunistic, he seems to always seek to climb the corporate ladder. However, this is because he pays a substantial amount of child support, and seeks a better life for his many children. His nickname, taken from his comic turns, is "Sunflower", given to him by Gigalt.

Edelgard Rivera

- Voiced by: Maiko Itō (Japanese); Kate Higgins (English)

The temporary worker, who does the secretarial and clerical duties of the Debris Section. She works in the Debris Section in order to complete her studies. Projecting a quiet and professional exterior, she hides a darker past which she wishes to leave behind her. Her nickname from Gigalt is "Hourglass". In the final episode, her contract at Technora ends but decides to work as a regular employee at the General Affairs section.

== ISPV 7 Staff ==
The ISPV 7 Staff only appear in the anime.

Claire Rondo

- Voiced by: Kumiko Watanabe (Japanese); Lia Sargent (English)

A member of the Control Section, a combination of mission control and air traffic control for spacecraft around or based in the ISPV 7 Space Station. She was raised in and a citizen of the United States, but born in the impoverished South American nation of El Tanika. She makes a fateful friendship with Hakim, of the Orbital Security Agency and later, a Jupiter Mission candidate.
Gigalt gave her a nickname too - "The Swan". He gave his reasoning for this nickname to Tanabe: Claire's personality is, on the surface, serene and relaxed. But below the surface, she is working (paddling) very hard just to keep pace with the world around her. In this way, Claire's career-driven personality is well described, very penetratingly by Gigalt.

Kho Cheng-Shin

- Voiced by: Nobuyuki Hiyama (Japanese); Steven Blum (English)

A spacecraft pilot based in the ISPV 7 Space Station. He has been friends with Claire and Hachimaki ever since they all came to the Space Station together. He is often playing confidant to Hachimaki. Cheng-Shin has a crush on Tanabe.

== Von Braun characters ==
Goro Hoshino (星野 五郎, Hoshino Gorō)

- Voiced by: Shōzō Iizuka (Japanese); Tom Wyner (English)

The Chief Engineer of the Von Braun Jupiter Exploration Spacecraft and Hachimaki's father. He is portrayed as an eccentric genius, and seeks to constantly irritate his eldest son. Plays the part of the "dirty old man". He was a pioneer in space exploration, as he was on a mission to build a human settlement on Mars before joining the Von Braun.

Werner Locksmith

- Voiced by: Unshō Ishizuka (Japanese); Dave Mallow (English)

The CEO of the Jupiter Mission and Chief Designer of the Von Braun Jupiter Exploration Spacecraft. Seemingly cold and heartless, he is portrayed in the anime and manga as someone without sympathy and believes that the ends justify the means. This implies getting the Von Braun to Jupiter no matter what the cost is, human or monetary.

Hakim Ashmead

- Voiced by: Ryūzaburō Ōtomo (Japanese); Peter Spellos (English)

A Jupiter Mission candidate, along with Hachimaki. Hakim and Hachimaki had the same EVA instructor, and have some personal connection with each other. Prior to entering the Jupiter Exploration program, Hakim was a member of the Orbital Security Agency (OSA). It turns out that he is a member of the Space Defence Front, the terrorist organization that threatened to initiate the Kessler Syndrome in Earth's orbit. In his last moments, Gigalt wonders how he didn't come up with a nickname for his former student, as he was informed he was actually a terrorist working undercover.

== Volume 4 Characters ==
Volume 4 Characters only appear in detail within the manga, though some do have minor cameos within the anime series.

Danshaku

A fellow debris collector, nicknamed "The Baron", who sports a large pompadour and glasses. He claims that he is from the planet Reticle, and is on a mission to make one hundred friends. He is seen as always socially awkward, much like Lt. Cmdr. Data in Star Trek. He writes his notes about etiquette, observations, and human interaction in his small notebook. The Baron also claims that he was made into a human as a punishment for making crop circles and performing cow mutilations for his own enjoyment while on a mission for the Galaxy Union to observe humanity. Becomes fast friends with Tanabe, and by extension, Fee and Yuri. His nickname is a reference to Baron Munchausen for his tall tales of being an alien.
The Baron does however make a guest appearance in the Anime, as one of the guys at a party for Hachimaki. He is seen very briefly as the party is viewed from above.

Albert Charmichael

Fee's nine-year-old son. He is responsible for the Charmichael household being full of dogs, as he brings them home whenever he sees a stray on the street. Albert displays little respect for his mother, since she does not come home very often. Albert appears very briefly in the anime, with one of his signature dogs pulling him along during a family outing to Cape Canaveral.

Colonel Sanders

An American colonel who seeks to prevent the war between the United States of America and an unnamed Republic. He filed a report to his commanding officer of the Kessler Syndrome that would be the result of an orbital war, but to no avail. Sanders sought to support Fee on her protest against orbital mines, which also failed. He was berated by Fee and Tanabe on his name, rank, and appearance, which is very similar to Colonel Harland Sanders, the founder of KFC.

== Other characters ==
Gigalt Gangaragash

- Voiced by: Norio Wakamoto (Japanese); Paul St. Peter (English)

A veteran astronaut, formerly of Technora Corporation's Debris Section, and currently with the Orbital Security Agency. He is Hachimaki and Hakim's EVA instructor. Gigalt contracted cancer (most probably lung cancer) from prolonged exposure to radiation from his many EVA missions. Gigalt only appears in the anime. Gigalt has a habit of bestowing nicknames on work partners, including Hachimaki's nickname of 'Hachi', which is the only one which stuck. The last two nicknames he bestows are 'Angel' to Ai Tanabe, and 'Artemis' to Nono while she keeps him company at Tranquility City Hospital.

Harry Roland

- Voiced by: Yōsuke Akimoto (Japanese); Michael Forest (English)

A veteran astronaut who is in love with outer space. He attempts suicide when his leukemia threatens his ability to go into space. He was Gigalt's EVA instructor.

Kyutaro Hoshino (星野九太郎, Hoshino Kyūtarō)

- Voiced by: Soichiro Hoshi (Japanese); Johnny Yong Bosch (English)

Hachimaki's younger brother, currently a high school student on Earth and an amateur rocket maker. Kyutaro considers Hachimaki an "insincere astronaut", and any conversation between the two almost always degenerates into a brawl. Kyutaro hopes to eventually become an engineer to design larger and more powerful rockets.

Nono

- Voiced by: Satomi Koorogi (Japanese); Lara Jill Miller (English)

A twelve-year-old girl who, along with three other children, is a "Lunarian", born and has lived her whole life on the Moon. Due to the effects of lower gravity, she's grown to be very tall and appears to be twice her age. Her physiology is always examined as part of a study on the effect of being born and raised on the Moon. Once the study is finished, she wishes to visit the Earth and swim in the ocean, although she also states she doesn't want to live there because she considers the Moon to be her home. Gigalt bestows on her a very poetic and affectionate nickname of 'Artemis' as she keeps him company.
