= Fly Me to the Moon (disambiguation) =

"Fly Me to the Moon" is a song written by Bart Howard and made famous by Frank Sinatra.

Fly Me to the Moon may also refer to:

== Music ==
- Fly Me to the Moon (Bobby Womack album), 1969
- Fly Me to the Moon (Michael Feinstein album), 2010
- Fly Me to the Moon... The Great American Songbook Volume V, a 2010 album by Rod Stewart

== Film ==
- Fly Me to the Moon (2008 film), an animated film
- Fly Me to the Moon (2023 film), a Hong Kong film starring Wu Kang-ren and Angela Yuen
- Fly Me to the Moon (2024 film), an American film

== Television ==
- "Fly Me to the Moon", a 1967 episode of the TV series I Dream of Jeannie
- "Fly Me to the Moon", a 2003 episode of the anime series Planetes
- "Fly Me to the Moon", a 2006 episode of the TV series Teenage Mutant Ninja Turtles

== Other uses ==
- Fly Me to the Moon (manga), a manga series by Kenjiro Hata
- The fanzine of Middlesbrough F.C.
- FlyMe2TheMoon, the first mobile game developed by the Chinese video game developer miHoYo
