= Will Brill =

American actor (born 1986)

- Brill at the 2026 Toronto International Film Festival
- Born: July 11, 1986 (age 40)
- Education: Carnegie Mellon University (BFA)
- Occupation: Actor
- Years active: 2008–present

Will Brill (born July 11, 1986) is an American actor. He is known for his role as Scott Brown in The OA. Additionally, Brill also starred in Stereophonic, a show on Broadway loosely based on the creation of the Fleetwood Mac album Rumours, winning the Tony Award for Best Featured Actor in a Play for his performance.

== Early life and education ==
Brill grew up in Menlo Park, California. Brill loved singing from an early age and participated in children's theaters across the San Francisco Bay Peninsula, where he grew up.

During his high school years, he left Menlo School amid a scandalous fake ID fiasco and subsequently attended Menlo-Atherton High School. While there, he continued to do children's theater and co-directed a production of Lost in Yonkers. After only one semester, he transferred to Woodside High School in Redwood City to do more theatre. Afterwards, he transferred to Gunn High School, one of the top public schools in the country, to be with friends and do lots of theatre. After graduating from Gunn High School, he attended Carnegie Mellon School of Drama.

== Career ==
In 2020, Brill starred as an apparition come to life of William Shakespeare in the film The Scottish Play. In addition to his television and film work, Brill has also appeared on Broadway, as part of the original cast of Act One, as Ed in the 2014 revival of You Can't Take It with You, and as Ali Hakim in the reimagined 75th-anniversary revival of Oklahoma!. He has also appeared in off-Broadway productions of Tribes and Our Town, both directed by David Cromer.

== Acting credits ==
=== Film ===
Year	Title	Role	Notes
2010	Faith	Slim	
2012	Girls Against Boys	Duncan	
2012	King Kelly	Ryan	
2012	Not Fade Away	Wells	
2013	Beside Still Waters	Martin	
2015	Up the River	Thomas	
2015	Don't Worry Baby	Jack	
2016	The Eyes of My Mother	Charlie	
2018	Piercing	The Bellhop	
2018	Slice	Bradley	
2018	Unsane	Male Patient	
2018	Ride	Bruno	
2019	Test Pattern	Evan	
2020	The Scottish Play	William Shakespeare	
2021	To the Moon	Roger Lotz	
2023	Power Signal	Michael	
2023	Tender	JD	
2025	Caught Stealing	Jason	
2026	The Musical	Doug Leibowitz	Completed
2026	The Whisper Man		Post-production
TBA	Being Heumann		Post-production

=== Television ===
Year	Title	Role	Notes	Ref.
2010	Louie	Guy #1	Episode: "Dogpound"	
2015	Gotham	Arnold Dobkins	2 episodes	
2015	The Blacklist	Gavin Delgado	Episode: "Arioch Cain (No. 50)"	
2015	The Knick	Leo Guggenheim	Episode: "The Best with the Best to Get the Best"	
2015	Elementary	Tyler Eggert	2 episodes	
2016	Civil	Randy	Unaired pilot	
2016	Person of Interest	Charlie Vaida	Episode: "Synecdoche"	
2016–2019	The OA	Scott Brown	12 episodes	
2017	Law & Order: Special Victims Unit	Harry Ingram	Episode: "Net Worth"	
2017	NCIS: New Orleans	Otis	Episode: "Dead Man Calling"	
2017–2023	The Marvelous Mrs. Maisel	Noah Weissman	10 episodes	
2021	Lisey's Story	Gerd Allen Cole	Episode: "Bool Hunt"	
2022	The Time Traveler's Wife	Ben	Episode: "1.6"	
2023	Fellow Travelers	Roy Cohn	6 episodes	
2024	The Walking Dead: The Ones Who Live	Dalton	Episode: "Become"	
2025	Long Story Short	Toby (voice)	Episode: "Uncle Barry"	
2025	Monster: The Ed Gein Story	Tobe Hooper	2 episodes	
2025	The Beast in Me	Chris Ingram	2 episodes	
2026	Cupertino	Richard Everett	Episode: "Michael & Olivia"	

=== Theater ===
Year	Title	Role	Venue	Notes	Ref.
2009–2010	Our Town	Joe Crowell	Barrow Street Theatre	Off-Broadway	
2012–2013	Tribes	Daniel	Barrow Street Theatre	National premiere; Off-Broadway	
2013	Tribes	Daniel	Mark Taper Forum	Los Angeles	
2014	Act One	Dore Schary / George / David Allen	Vivian Beaumont Theatre	Broadway	
2014–2015	You Can't Take It with You	Ed Carmichael	Longacre Theatre	Broadway	
2017	Illyria	Bernie Gersten	The Public Theater	World premiere; Off-Broadway	
2019–2020	Oklahoma!	Ali Hakim	Circle in the Square Theatre	Broadway	
2022	A Case for the Existence of God	Ryan	Signature Theatre	World premiere; Off-Broadway	
2023	Uncle Vanya	Astrov	OHenry Productions	Off-Broadway	
2023	Stereophonic	Reg	Playwrights Horizons	World premiere; Off-Broadway	
2024	Stereophonic	Reg	John Golden Theatre	Broadway	
2025	Meet The Cartozians	Wallace McCamant/Alan O'Brien	Second Stage	Off-Broadway	

== Awards and nominations ==
Year	Award	Category	Project	Result	Ref.
2012	Outer Critics Circle Awards	Outstanding Featured Actor in a Play	Tribes	Nominated	
2023	Drama Desk Awards	Outstanding Lead Performance in a Play	A Case for the Existence of God	Nominated	
2024	Tony Awards	Best Featured Actor in a Play	Stereophonic	Won	
2024	Broadway.com Audience Awards	Favorite Featured Actor in a Play	Stereophonic	Nominated	
2024	Drama Desk Awards	Ensemble Award	Stereophonic	Won	
