= Planetes =

Japanese manga series

- First tankōbon volume cover

プラネテス (Puranetesu)
- Genre: Hard science fiction
- Manga
- Written by: Makoto Yukimura
- Published by: Kodansha
- English publisher: NA: Tokyopop (former); Dark Horse Manga
- Imprint: Morning KC
- Magazine: Morning
- Original run: January 1999 – January 2004
- Volumes: 4
- Anime television series
- Directed by: Gorō Taniguchi
- Produced by: Yoshitaka Kawaguchi; Atsushi Yukawa; Tomoyuki Uehara
- Written by: Ichirō Ōkouchi
- Music by: Kōtarō Nakagawa
- Studio: Sunrise
- Licensed by: Crunchyroll; BI: Anime Limited
- Original network: NHK BS2
- English network: BI: AnimeCentral; US: ImaginAsian TV
- Original run: October 4, 2003 – April 17, 2004
- Episodes: 26
- icon

Planetes (Japanese: プラネテス; Puranetesu; Ancient Greek: Πλάνητες Planētes, "Wanderers") is a Japanese manga series written and illustrated by Makoto Yukimura. It was serialized in Kodansha's seinen manga magazine Morning between January 1999 to January 2004, with its chapters collected into four tankōbon volumes. The story revolves around a crew of a space debris collection craft in the year 2075.

It was adapted into a 26-episode anime television series by Sunrise, aired on NHK from October 2003 through April 2004. The manga was published in English in North America by Tokyopop, and the anime was distributed in North America by Bandai Entertainment. Both the manga and anime received the Seiun Award for best science fiction series.

== Plot ==
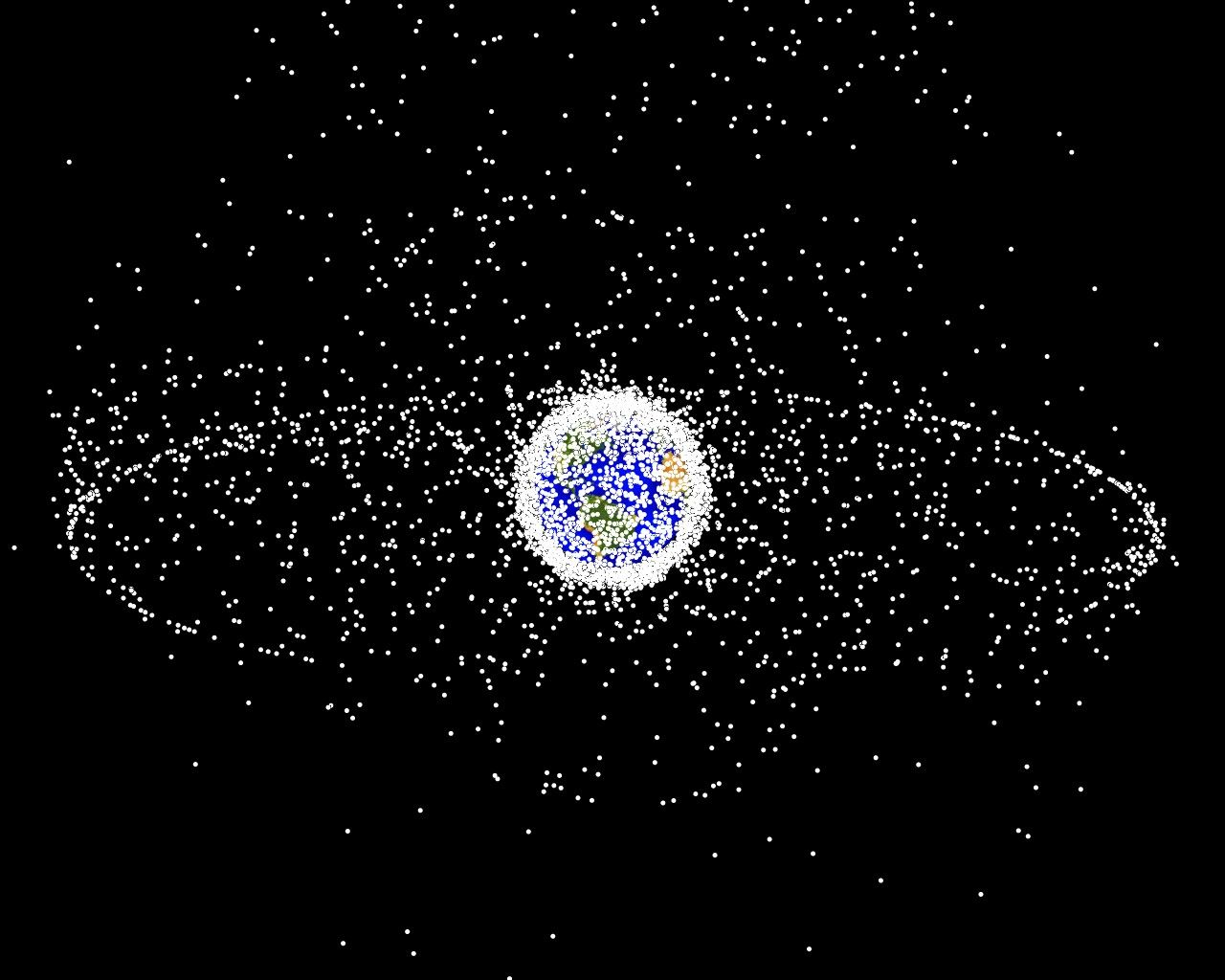
Space debris around Earth, NASA visualization

The story of Planetes follows the crew of the DS-12 "Toy Box" of the Space Debris Section, a unit of Technora Corporation. Debris Section's purpose is to prevent the damage or destruction of satellites, space stations and spacecraft from collision with space debris in Earth's and the Moon's orbits. They use a number of methods to dispose of the debris (mainly by burning it via atmospheric reentry or through salvage), accomplished through the use of EVA suits. On a routine debris collection run, Yuri Mihairokov finds a compass, the only keepsake of his deceased wife, and is rescued by Hachirota "Hachimaki" Hoshino. Pilot Fee Carmichael stops the terrorist plan by ramming the Toy Box into the satellite and knocking it off course, sacrificing the Toy Box in the process. Hachimaki, Yuri, and Fee return to Earth, where Yuri stays with Hachimaki's family. On their return, Hachmaki is diagnosed with Deep Space Disorder, a mental disorder that can cripple an EVA astronaut. Yuri and Fee take Hachimaki to a space engine manufacturing facility and show him the Tandem Mirror Engine, which will be installed in the Von Braun for the Jupiter Exploration Mission. Seeing this, Hachimaki resolves to join the Mission and gets over his Deep Space Disorder.

Werner Locksmith finds Hachimaki while looking for Hachimaki's father, Goro Hoshino, to recruit him as the captain of the Von Braun. Fresh recruit Ai Tanabe is added to the crew of the Toy Box 2 as a replacement for Hachimaki when he leaves to become a Jupiter Mission candidate. At the trials for the Jupiter Exploration Mission, Hachimaki learns his friend Hakim Ashmead is a terrorist bombing of an elevator. Hachimaki subdues Hakim, but is stopped from killing him by Tanabe. After being accepted in the Jupiter Exploration Mission, Hachimaki and his co-pilot Leonov crash on to the Moon's surface. Leonov is badly injured in the crash, and Hachimaki tries to carry him to safety before being rescued by Toy Box 2.

Tanabe runs experiments with several animals on behalf of a university, as well as another ship's pet cat, on the Toy Box 2. Alarmed by his new stoicism, crewmate Sally offers herself to him, but Hachimaki realizes he desires Tanabe instead. He proposes to her to which she accepts. Tanabe meets and befriends The Baron, a fellow debris hauler who claims he is an alien from the planet Retikle on a mission to make a hundred friends on Earth. Werner Locksmith visits the grave of his associate killed in the Tandem Mirror Engine explosion, where the associate's sister threatens to kill him. After returning from a holiday on Earth, Fee and the crew of Toy Box 2 find a piece of classified debris, a United States Navy orbital mine. With a space war looming, Fee leads an anti-war movement to prevent Kessler Syndrome and becomes a media sensation when Colonel Sanders uses her as a hero of the anti-war movement, without her consent.

Fee recounts her experience with her uncle in the American South, particularly the racism that he encountered as an unemployed, reclusive black man living in the woods. The crew of Toy Box 2 are returned to Earth, where Fee goes home to her family and attempts to resume her life as a mother. She crashes her motorcycle while avoiding a dog, but she befriends the dog and drags her motorcycle back home. The captain of Von Braun struggles with the speech he will give when the ship reaches Jupiter, resulting in him being hospitalized with a stomach ulcer. Hachimaki makes his speech when Von Braun arrives at Jupiter, concluding that he is perfectly satisfied with what he already has, and giving up on his dream of owning his own spaceship.

== Production ==
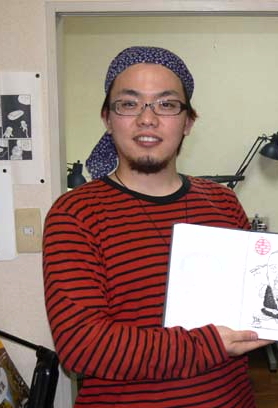
Manga author Makoto Yukimura

After working as an assistant for Shin Morimura, Makoto Yukimura started his manga. According to manga author Makoto Yukimura, the conception of Planetes was simple. One day in a library, he came across a scientific book that talked about the remains of spacecraft and satellites that were in Earth orbit. Yukimura found it interesting to know that these debris were dangerous for us, and that, at some point in life, he meant, a few years from now, these debris would be seriously disturbing the progress of the planet. Upon finishing the book, Yukimura decided to write a manga about this concept. There were no major influences other than Arthur C. Clarke. While their works are not the same, he was moved by the dilemmas of his theories. He then researched Japanese writers and was moved by Kōshū Tani. Planetes could have dozens of volumes, if he were to count the work carried out daily by space garbage collectors. However, his only goal was to show the characters' daily lives in a futuristic setting. He liked to tell the whole story with a beginning, middle, and end, and when he saw that it already had enough content, he finished it, regardless of how many volumes there are.

Concepts like momentum in weightlessness are early plot points and are always illustrated naturally. Director Goro Taniguchi stated in the DVD commentary that he learned much about orbital mechanics in the course of making the series. This can be shown in showing specific orbital energy, through changing orbits by applying thrust throughout the series. Even the necessity for the retrieval of space debris that is central to the plot is rooted in the serious and growing problem with space debris today. The Japanese space agency JAXA served as a technical consultant to the series. The US version of the DVDs featured interviews with two scientists from NASA's Orbital Debris Section. However, both scientists stated that the premise of having to rendezvous with debris in orbit is highly unlikely as it would take an extravagant amount of energy for a relatively small amount of salvageable material. One of the scientists stated that the previous director of the NASA Orbital Debris Section was in fact Donald J. Kessler, the scientist who proposed the eponymous Kessler Syndrome, which is cited and used several times in both the anime and manga. The final settlement of the conflict is also unique in that it is not resolved by any of the main protagonists or antagonists, but by a compromise struck between powers above their heads.

== Media ==
=== Manga ===
Written and illustrated by Makoto Yukimura, the twenty-six chapters appeared as a serial in the Kodansha's seinen manga magazine Weekly Morning from January 1999 to January 2004. Kodansha collected the chapters into four tankōbon volumes, and published them from January 23, 2001, to February 23, 2004. It was licensed for an English-language translation in North America by Tokyopop. It published the series in five volumes by splitting the last volume in two parts from October 7, 2003, to February 8, 2005. The translation was rereleased in two omnibus volumes by Dark Horse Comics on December 22, 2015, and May 10, 2016.

==== Volumes ====
No.	Original release date	Original ISBN	North America release date	North America ISBN
1	January 23, 2001	978-4-06-328735-6	October 7, 2003	978-1-59182-262-2
01. "A Stardust Sky" (屑星の空, Kuzuboshi no Sora); 02. "A Girl From Beyond the Earth" (地球外少女, Chikyū-gai Shōjo); 03. "A Cigarette Under Starlight" (ささやかなる一服を星あかりのもとで, Sasayakanaru Ippuku o Hoshiakari no Moto de); 04. "Scenery for a Rocket" (ロケットのある風景, Roketto no aru Fūkei); 05. "Ignition" (点火, Tenka)
2	October 23, 2001	978-4-06-328778-3	January 6, 2004	978-1-59182-509-8
06. "Running Man" (走る男, Hashiru Otoko); 07. "Tanabe" (タナベ, Tanabe); Extra Phase: This Is a Happy Life, From a Certain Point of View (或いはそれこそが幸せな日々, Aruiwa sore koso ga shiawasenahibi); 08. "A Black Flower Named Sakinohaka" (Part 1) (サキノハカという黒い華 (前編), Sakinohaka to iu Kuroi Hana (Zenpen)); 09. "A Black Flower Named Sakinohaka" (Part 2) (サキノハカという黒い華 (後編), Sakinohaka to iu Kuroi Hana (Kōhen)); 10. "Lost Souls" (惑う人達, Madou Hitotachi); 11. "СПАСИБО"
3	January 24, 2003	978-4-06-328863-6	June 1, 2004	978-1-59182-510-4
12. "A Cat in the Evening" (夜の猫, Yoru no Neko); 13. "Windmillville" (風車の町, Kazaguruma no Machi); 14. "Boy and Girl" (おとこのコとおんなのコ, Otoko no ko to Onna no ko); 15. "A Day of Kyakurai" (却来の日, Kyakurai no Hi); 16. "Hachimaki" (ハチマキ, Hachimaki); Extra Phase: "Red Star/White Ball" (赤い星、白いタマ, Akai Hoshi, Shiroi Tama)
4	February 23, 2004	978-4-06-328937-4	November 9, 2004 (part 1); February 8, 2005 (part 2)	978-1-59532-208-1 (part 1); 978-1-59532-467-2 (part 2)
Part 1: 17. "How to Make a Hundred Friends" (友達100人できるかな, Tomodachi 100-nin dekiru ka na); 18. "Just Like Guskou Budori" (グスコーブドリのように, Gusukō Budori no Yō ni); 19. "Dog Days" (犬の日々, Inu no Hibi); 20. "Man's Best Friend"/"Pet Dogs" (飼犬, Kaiinu); 21. "Little Girls and Underdogs" (少女と負け犬, Shōjo to Makeinu); Part 2: 22. "A Crying Dog" (泣く犬, Naku inu); 23. "A Running Dog" (疾る犬, Hashi ru Inu); 24. "A Barking Dog" (咆える犬, Hoeru Inu); 25. "45 Minutes at the Speed of Light" (光の速さで45分, Hikarinohayasa de 45-fun); 26. "What a Wonderful World" (What a Wonderful World)

=== Anime ===
A 26-episode anime television series adaptation aired on NHK BS-2 from October 4, 2003, to February 23, 2004. Produced and animated by Sunrise, it was directed by Gorō Taniguchi and scripted by Ichirō Ōkouchi. The anime began development and production before the end of the manga serialization. In the beginning and middle of the series, the writing and production staff only had the first three volumes of the manga as source. To fill the entire 26-episode run of the anime, new characters, new settings and new relationships between characters were made to increase dramatic tension, reinforce themes introduced in the manga, and introduce new themes that were compatible with the manga. While the manga deals more with existential themes, and humanity's relationship with space, the anime further expands the political elements of the story.

The music score was composed by Kōtarō Nakagawa and produced by Victor Entertainment. The opening theme is "Dive in the Sky" by Mikio Sakai, and the ending themes are "Wonderful Life" by Mikio Sakai for episodes 1–25 and "Planetes" by Hitomi Kuroishi for episode 26. There are two insert songs, "A Secret of the Moon" by Hitomi Kuroishi, used in various episodes, and "Thanks My Friend" by Mikio Sakai used in episode 13.

Crunchyroll added the series to its streaming platform on October 15, 2024, and it is set to be released on a Blu-ray Disc set on November 5 of the same year.

== Reception ==
Both the manga and the anime were critically acclaimed. According to Anime News Network, the manga has a "solid, engrossing storyline and well-developed characters". Anime News Network also proclaimed Planetes to be the best science fiction anime series of 2005. Both the manga and anime received the Seiun Award for best science fiction series, the manga in 2002 and the anime in 2005. The manga was nominated for a Angoulême International Comics Festival award in the Raja Eco-Fauve Selection category in 2023. The designers, Riley Vandyke and Carl Gustav Horn, for designing its deluxe edition from the first book, won the Japan Society and Anime NYC's second American Manga Awards for Best Publication Design in 2025.

Pop Matters described Planetes as one of the best sci-fi manga due to the setting chosen and how Yukimura executes the characterization of the main characters. Mania Entertainment initially praised the handling of Hachimaki and Tanabe who possessed their own unique dreams and traits in the manga despite working together and enjoyed Yukimura's artwork, standing not only for the character designs but also backgrounds. In a following review, Otaku USA liked the artwork for the detailed character designs, most notably their expressions and also recommended the manga due to its focus on human relationships. Comics Worth Reading recommended the manga, praising the execution of the several themes the characters deal with such as space isolation or conflicts with terrorists which helps to develop Hachimaki and his relationship with the supporting characters. Animefringe noted that despite being a seinen manga, the series is still accessible for young readers due to the lack of over-the-top violence and the nudity being kept to a minimum. For the climax, Mania enjoyed the new conflicts Hachimaki's career faced and how he still fought to decide what to do with his life alongside Tanabe. The Techora side of the story also met similar response by Mania.

The anime was praised by Mania for the focus on Hachimaki and Tanabe's relationship as the apparent love triangle with the young Nono helped to expand more on the knowledge about Lunarians' growth and how her condition was not treated as a disadvantage as Nono enjoys living in the Moon.

In terms of sales, the manga was only a modest success in North America, with volume 3 reaching 81st place on the Diamond US sales top 100, selling about 1100 copies through the distributor. Volume 4 reached 93rd place, selling about 1400 copies.

== See also ==
- Kessler syndrome § In fiction
