= To the Moon (2021 film) =

- Directed by: Scott Friend
- Written by: Scott Friend
- Produced by: David Formentin; Everett Hendler; Stephanie Randall; Cate Smierciak; Gabriel Wilson
- Starring: Scott Friend; Will Brill; Madeleine Morgenweck
- Cinematography: Dan Debrey
- Edited by: David Formentin
- Music by: Jason Martin Castillo
- Production company: To the Moon Film
- Distributed by: 1091 Pictures
- Release dates: 29 October 2021 (Nightstream); 20 September 2022 (VOD)
- Running time: 82 minutes
- Country: United States
- Language: English

To the Moon is a 2021 American psychological thriller film directed by Scott Friend, starring Friend, Will Brill and Madeleine Morgenweck. It was Friend's directorial debut.

== Cast ==
- Scott Friend as Roger Lotz
- Will Brill as Dennis Lotz
- Madeleine Morgenweck as Mia Lotz

== Release ==
The film premiered at Nightstream on 29 October 2021. It was released to Video on Demand on 20 September 2022.

== Reception ==
Andrew Stover of Film Threat gave the film a score of 8/10 and called it "thoughtfully written and beautifully shot", as well as "singular and memorable", despite suffering from some "pacing issues".

Cassandra Clarke of Comic Book Resources called the film "thrilling to watch" and wrote that the script "really pushes its core cast to embody all the tensions that come with a relationship built on lies."

Alexandra Heller-Nicholas of the Alliance of Women Film Journalists called the film "lithe" and "powerful", and wrote that it "uses its slender production context to great effect, granting each of the three central players enormous scope to flesh out their characters."
