= Donald J. Kessler =

American astrophysicist (born 1940)

- Born: 1940 (age 85–86)
- Education: University of Houston
- Known for: Kessler syndrome
- Awards: AIAA Losey Atmospheric Sciences Award (2000); IAASS Jerome Lederer Space Safety Pioneer Award (2008); AAS Dirk Brouwer Award (2010)
- Scientific career
- Fields: Senior Scientist for Orbital Debris Research
- Workplaces: NASA

Donald J. Kessler (born 1940) is an American astrophysicist and former NASA scientist known for his studies regarding space debris.

== Early life and education ==
Kessler grew up in Texas. He served in the U.S. Army in the Air Defense Command. He attended the University of Houston beginning in 1962 and studied physics. He began working at the National Aeronautics and Space Administration (NASA) before graduating from college.

== Early career ==
Kessler was a flight controller for Skylab, the US space station launched by NASA in 1973.

== Career ==
Kessler worked at the Johnson Space Center in Houston, Texas, as part of NASA's Environmental Effects Project Office. While there, he developed what is now known as the Kessler syndrome, which posits that collisions between space debris become increasingly likely as the density of space debris increases in orbit around the Earth, and a cascade effect results as each collision in turn creates more debris that can cause further collisions. With Burton G. Cour-Palais, Kessler first published his ideas in 1978, in an academic paper titled "Collision Frequency of Artificial Satellites: The Creation of a Debris Belt." The paper established Kessler's reputation, and NASA subsequently made him the head of the newly created Orbital Debris Program Office to study the issue and establish guidelines to slow the accumulation of space debris.

Kessler retired from NASA in 1996, and has maintained a website with his publications and contact information. He currently lives in Asheville, North Carolina. He continues to be active in the field of orbital debris. In 2009, he gave an address to the first International Conference on Orbital Debris Removal in Arlington, Virginia, co-sponsored by NASA and DARPA. In 2011, he was a key adviser in the making of the educational IMAX film Space Junk 3D and also served as chairman of a United States National Research Council committee to assess NASA's orbital debris programs. In 2013, he gave a special lecture in Tokyo to the Second International Symposium on Sustainable Space Development and Utilization for Humankind, sponsored by the Japan Space Forum, and in 2017 gave the keynote address at the 7th European Conference on Space Debris.

== Awards and honors ==
- Kessler has received numerous awards for his pioneering work, the most recent being the 2010 Dirk Brower Award for his half-century career in astrodynamics.
- The central main-belt asteroid 11267 Donaldkessler, discovered by American astronomer Schelte Bus at the Californian Palomar Observatory in 1981, was named in his honor on 13 April 2017 (M.P.C. 103977). In 1999 he was given the "Medal for Exceptional Scientific Achievement".

== In popular culture ==
In the science-fiction thriller comedy film Mars Attacks! (1996), Pierce Brosnan plays a science advisor named Donald Kessler, who gives the US president (Jack Nicholson) very bad advice on how to establish diplomatic relations with the Martians.
