= Kessler syndrome =

Theoretical satellite collision cascade

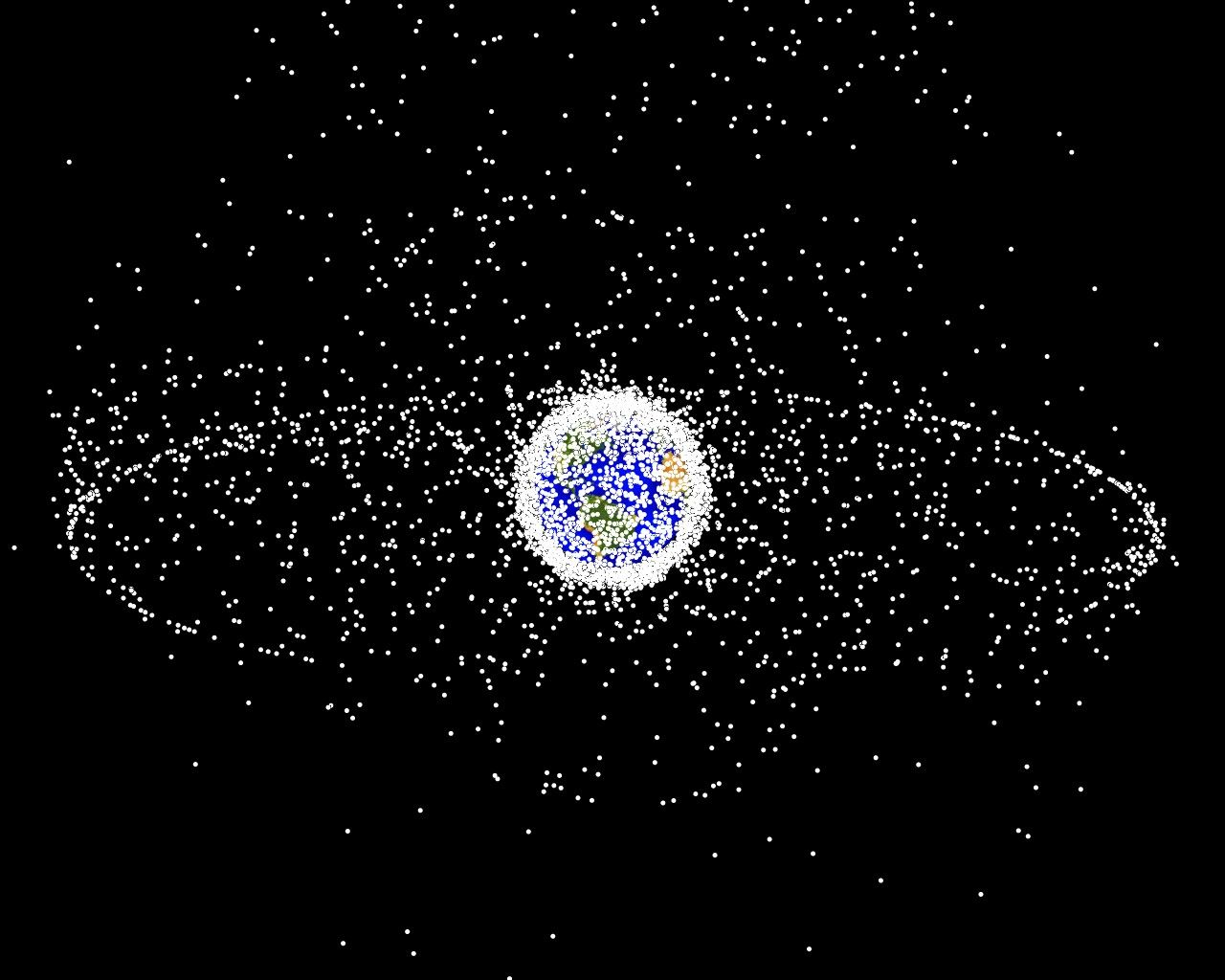
Space debris populations (not to scale) seen from outside geosynchronous orbit (GSO). There are two primary debris fields: the ring of objects in GSO and the cloud of objects in low Earth orbit (LEO).

The Kessler syndrome, also known as the Kessler effect, collisional cascading, or ablation cascade, is a scenario proposed by NASA scientists Donald J. Kessler and Burton G. Cour-Palais in 1978. It describes a situation in which the density of objects in low Earth orbit (LEO) becomes so high due to space pollution that collisions between these objects cascade, exponentially increasing the amount of space debris over time. This proliferation of debris poses significant risks to satellites, space missions, and the International Space Station, potentially rendering certain orbital regions unusable and threatening the sustainability of space activities for many generations. In 2009, Kessler wrote that modeling results indicated the debris environment had already become unstable, meaning that efforts to achieve a growth-free small debris environment by eliminating past debris sources would likely fail because fragments from future collisions would accumulate faster than atmospheric drag could remove them.

== History ==
=== NORAD, Gabbard and Kessler ===
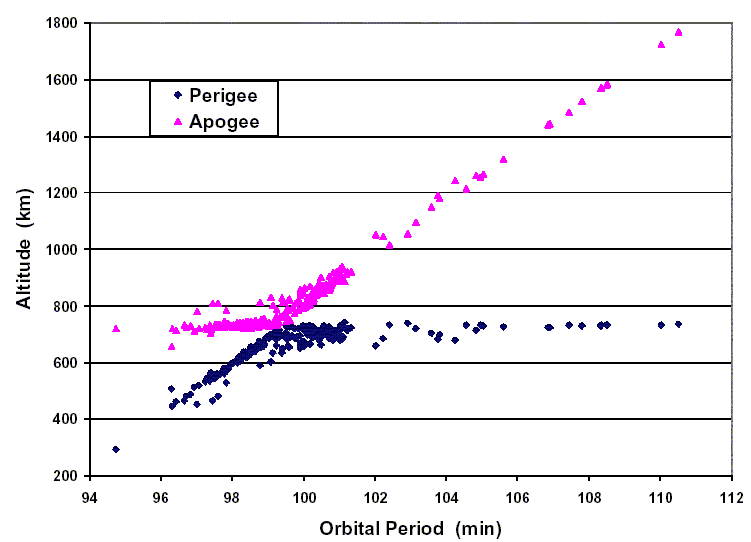
Gabbard diagram of almost 300 pieces of debris from the disintegration of the five-month-old third stage of the Chinese Long March 4 booster on 11 March 2000

Willy Ley predicted in 1960 that "In time, a number of such accidentally too-lucky shots will accumulate in space and will have to be removed when the era of manned space flight arrives". After the launch of Sputnik 1 in 1957, the US North American Aerospace Defense Command (NORAD) began compiling a database (the Space Object Catalog) of all known rocket launches and objects reaching orbit: satellites, protective shields, and upper- and lower-stage booster rockets. NASA later published modified versions of the database in a two-line element set format; and during the early 1980s, the CelesTrak bulletin board system re-published them.

The trackers who fed the database were aware of other objects in orbit, many of which were the result of in-orbit explosions. Some were deliberately caused during the 1960s anti-satellite weapon testing, and others were the result of rocket stages blowing up in orbit as leftover propellant expanded and ruptured their tanks. To improve tracking, NORAD employee John Gabbard kept a separate database. Studying the explosions, Gabbard developed a technique for predicting the orbital paths of their products, and Gabbard diagrams (or plots) are now widely used. These studies were used to improve the modeling of orbital evolution and decay.

When the NORAD database became publicly available during the 1970s, NASA scientist Donald J. Kessler applied to the database of known objects a technique developed to study the asteroid belt. In June 1978, Kessler and Burton Cour-Palais co-authored "Collision Frequency of Artificial Satellites: The Creation of a Debris Belt", demonstrating that the process controlling asteroid evolution would cause a similar collision process in LEO in decades rather than billions of years. They concluded that by about 2000, space debris would outpace micrometeoroids as the primary ablative risk to orbiting spacecraft.

At the time, it was widely thought that drag from the upper atmosphere would de-orbit debris faster than it was created. However, Gabbard was aware that the number and type of objects in space were under-represented in the NORAD data and was familiar with their behavior. In an interview shortly after the publication of the 1978 Kessler paper, Gabbard coined the term Kessler syndrome to refer to the accumulation of debris; it became widely used after its appearance in a 1982 Popular Science article, which won the Aviation-Space Writers Association 1982 National Journalism Award.

=== Follow-up studies ===
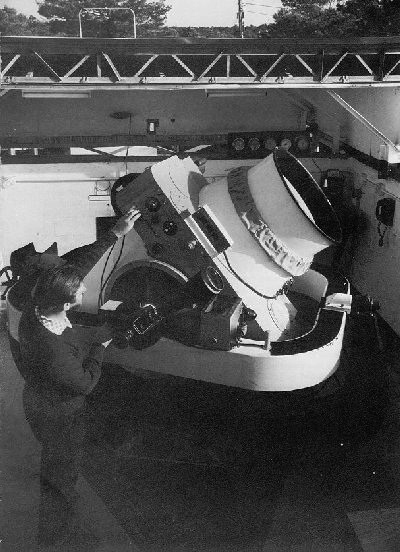
Baker–Nunn cameras were widely used to study space debris.

The lack of hard data about space debris prompted a series of studies to better characterize the LEO environment. In October 1979, NASA provided Kessler with funding for further studies. Several approaches were used by these studies.

Optical telescopes and short-wavelength radar were used to measure the number and size of space objects, and these measurements demonstrated that the published population count was at least 50% too low. Before this, it was believed that the NORAD database accounted for the majority of large objects in orbit. Some objects (typically, US military spacecraft) were found to be omitted from the NORAD list, and others were not included because they were considered unimportant. The list could not easily account for objects under 20 cm (8 in) in size—in particular, debris from exploding rocket stages and several 1960s anti-satellite tests.

Returned spacecraft were microscopically examined for small impacts, and sections of Skylab and the Apollo Command/Service Module which were recovered were found to be pitted. Each study indicated that the debris flux was higher than expected and debris was the primary source of micrometeoroids and orbital debris collisions in space. LEO already demonstrated the Kessler syndrome.

In 1978, Kessler found that 42 percent of cataloged debris was the result of 19 events, primarily explosions of spent rocket stages (especially US Delta rockets). He discovered this by first identifying those launches that were described as having a large number of objects associated with a payload, then researching the literature to determine the rockets used in the launch. In 1979, this finding resulted in establishment of the NASA Orbital Debris Program after a briefing to NASA senior management, overturning the previously held belief that most unknown debris was from old ASAT tests, not from US upper stage rocket explosions that could seemingly be easily managed by depleting the unused fuel from the upper stage Delta rocket following the payload injection. Beginning in 1986, when it was discovered that other international agencies were possibly experiencing the same type of problem, NASA expanded its program to include international agencies, the first being the European Space Agency. A number of other Delta components in orbit (Delta was a workhorse of the US space program) had not yet exploded.

=== A new Kessler syndrome ===
During the 1980s, the United States Air Force (USAF) conducted an experimental program to determine what would happen if debris collided with satellites or other debris. The study demonstrated that the process differed from micrometeoroid collisions, with large chunks of debris created which would become collision threats.

In 1991, Kessler published "Collisional cascading: The limits of population growth in low Earth orbit" with the best data then available. Citing the USAF conclusions about creation of debris, he wrote that although almost all debris objects (such as paint flecks) were lightweight, most of its mass was in debris about 1 kg (2 lb 3 oz) or heavier. This mass could destroy a spacecraft on impact, creating more debris in the critical-mass area. According to the National Academy of Sciences:

A 1 kg object impacting at 10 km/s, for example, is probably capable of catastrophically breaking up a 1,000 kg spacecraft if it strikes a high-density element in the spacecraft. In such a breakup, numerous fragments larger than 1 kg would be created.

Kessler's analysis divided the problem into three parts. With a low-enough density, the addition of debris by impacts is slower than their decay rate and the problem is not significant. Beyond that is a critical density, where additional debris leads to additional collisions. At higher densities, production exceeds decay, leading to a cascading chain reaction reducing the orbiting population to small objects (several centimeters in size) and increasing the hazard of space activity. This chain reaction is known as the Kessler syndrome.

In an early 2009 historical overview, Kessler summed up the situation:

Aggressive space activities without adequate safeguards could significantly shorten the time between collisions and produce an intolerable hazard to future spacecraft. Some of the most environmentally dangerous activities in space include large constellations such as those initially proposed by the Strategic Defense Initiative in the mid-1980s, large structures such as those considered in the late-1970s for building solar power stations in Earth orbit, and anti-satellite warfare using systems tested by the USSR, the US, and China over the past 30 years. Such aggressive activities could set up a situation where a single satellite failure could lead to cascading failures of many satellites in a period much shorter than years.

=== Anti-satellite missile tests ===
In 1985, the first anti-satellite (ASAT) missile was used in the destruction of a satellite. The American 1985 ASM-135 ASAT test was carried out, in which the Solwind P78-1 satellite flying at an altitude of 555 kilometres (345 mi) was struck by the 14-kilogram (31 lb) payload at a velocity of 24,000 kilometres per hour (15,000 mph; 6.7 km/s). When NASA learned of U.S. Air Force plans for the Solwind ASAT test, they modeled the effects of the test and determined that debris produced by the collision would still be in orbit late into the 1990s. It would force NASA to enhance debris shielding for its planned space station.

On 11 January 2007, the People's Republic of China (PRC) conducted an anti-satellite missile test in which one of their FY-1C weather satellites was chosen as the target. The collision occurred at an altitude of 865 kilometres (537 mi), when the satellite with a mass of 750 kilograms (1,650 lb) was struck in a head-on-collision by a kinetic payload traveling with a speed of 8 km/s (18,000 mph) in the opposite direction. The resulting debris orbits the Earth with a mean altitude above 850 kilometres (530 mi), and will likely remain in orbit for decades or centuries.

The destruction of the Kosmos 1408 satellite by a Russian ASAT missile on November 15, 2021, has created a large debris cloud, with 1500 pieces of debris being tracked and an estimated hundreds of thousands of pieces too small to track. Since the satellite was in a polar orbit, and its debris has spread out between the altitudes of 300 and 1,000 kilometres (190 and 620 mi), it could potentially collide with any LEO satellite, including the International Space Station and the Chinese Space Station (Tiangong).

=== Chinese rocket explosion ===
A significant event related to the Kessler Syndrome occurred on August 9, 2024, when a Chinese Long March 6A rocket broke apart in low-Earth orbit, creating a cloud of hundreds of debris fragments. The US Space Command confirmed this breakup, and it has been tracked by multiple space debris-tracking organizations. The event resulted in at least 700 fragments, with the potential for more than 900. The debris poses a substantial risk to low-Earth orbit constellations, particularly those orbiting below 800 kilometers, and may remain in orbit for years, increasing the likelihood of collisions. This incident highlights ongoing concerns about space debris and the increasing risk of a cascading effect as more objects are launched into orbit. Since 2000, the People's Republic of China has accumulated more "dead rocket mass" in long-lived orbits than the rest of the world combined.

== Debris generation and destruction ==
Every satellite, space probe, and crewed mission has the potential to produce space debris. The theoretical cascading Kessler syndrome becomes more likely as satellites in orbit increase in number. In 2025 the number was estimated at over 11,800, most of which (7,135) belonged to Starlink, the constellation of SpaceX. As of 2021, it was estimated that there were 600,000 pieces of space junk ranging from 1 to 10 cm (1/2 to 4 in), and 23,000 larger than that. On average, every year, one satellite is destroyed by collision with other satellites or space junk. As of 2009, there had been four collisions between catalogued objects, including a collision between two satellites in 2009.

Orbital decay is much slower at altitudes where atmospheric drag is insignificant. Slight atmospheric drag, lunar perturbation, and solar wind drag can gradually bring debris down to lower altitudes where fragments finally re-enter, but this process can take millennia at very high altitudes.

== Implications ==
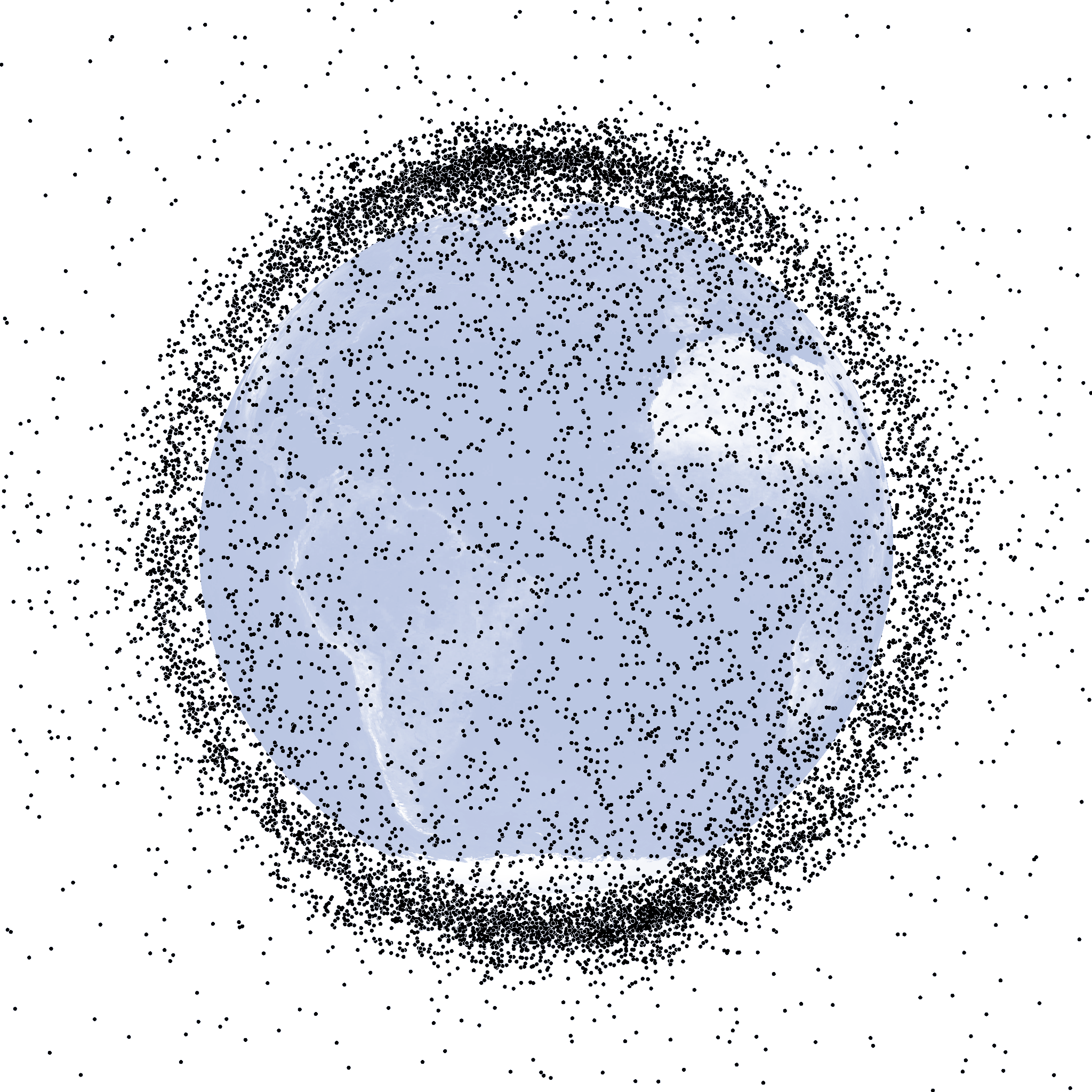
Image (not to scale) made from models used to track debris in Earth orbit as of July 2009

The Kessler syndrome is troublesome because of the domino effect and feedback runaway wherein impacts between objects of sizable mass spall off debris from the force of the collision. The fragments can then hit other objects, producing even more space debris: if a large enough collision or explosion were to occur, such as between a space station and a defunct satellite, or as the result of hostile actions in space, then the resulting debris cascade could make prospects for long-term viability of satellites in particular low Earth orbits extremely low. However, even a catastrophic Kessler scenario at LEO would pose minimal risk for launches continuing past LEO, or satellites travelling at medium Earth orbit (MEO) or geosynchronous orbit (GEO). The catastrophic scenarios predict an increase in the number of collisions per year, as opposed to a physically impassable barrier to space exploration that occurs in higher orbits.

=== As a solution to the Fermi paradox ===
Some astronomers have hypothesized Kessler syndrome as a possible or likely solution to the Fermi paradox, the lack of any sign of alien life in the universe. Any intelligent civilization which becomes spacefaring could eventually extinguish any safe orbits via Kessler syndrome, trapping itself within its home planet. Such a result could happen even with robust space pollution controls, as a lone malicious actor on a planet could cause a Kessler syndrome scenario. Humanity could be on the path to a similar fate, soon to trap itself on Earth with no future as a spacefaring civilization. Some exoplanet researchers have attempted to survey other planets for signs of a Kessler syndrome cascade as a sign of intelligent life.

== Avoidance and reduction ==
Designers of a new vehicle or satellite are frequently required by the International Telecommunication Union (ITU) to demonstrate that it can be safely disposed of at the end of its life, for example by use of a controlled atmospheric reentry system or a boost into a graveyard orbit. For US launches or satellites that will have broadcast to US territories—in order to obtain a license to provide telecommunications services in the United States—the Federal Communications Commission required all geostationary satellites launched after 18 March 2002 to commit to moving to a graveyard orbit at the end of their operational life. US government regulations similarly require a plan to dispose of satellites after the end of their mission: atmospheric re-entry, movement to a storage orbit, or direct retrieval.

A proposed energy-efficient means of deorbiting a spacecraft from medium Earth orbit is to shift it to an orbit in an unstable resonance with the Sun or Moon that speeds up orbital decay.

Several space debris models, designed on catalogues in-orbit fragmentation events, can be used both during the design phase and operative life to estimate the flux of space debris in order to accurately design shielding and collision avoidance manoeuvres.

One technology proposed to help deal with fragments from 1 to 10 cm (1/2 to 4 in) in size is the laser broom, a proposed multimegawatt land-based laser that could deorbit debris: the side of the debris hit by the laser would ablate and create a thrust that would change the eccentricity of the remains of the fragment until it would re-enter and be destroyed harmlessly.

ESA and the Swiss startup ClearSpace plans a mission to remove the PROBA-1 satellite from orbit.

== Potential concerns ==
An analysis determined that of the 50 "statistically most concerning" debris objects in low Earth orbit, the top 20 were all SL-16 upper stages.

The Envisat satellite is a large, inactive satellite with a mass of 8,211 kg (18,102 lb) that orbits at 785 km (488 mi), an altitude where the debris environment is the greatest—two catalogued objects can be expected to pass within about 200 m (660 ft) of Envisat every year—and likely to increase. Don Kessler predicted in 2012 that it could easily become a major debris contributor from a collision during the next 150 years that it will remain in orbit.

SpaceX's Starlink program raises concerns about significantly worsening the possibility of Kessler syndrome due to the large number of satellites the program is placing in LEO, as the program's goal will more than double the satellites currently in LEO. In response to these concerns, SpaceX said that a large number of Starlink satellites are launched at a lower altitude of 550 km (340 mi) to achieve lower latency (versus 1,150 km (710 mi) as originally planned), and failed satellites or debris are thus expected to deorbit within five years even without propulsion, due to atmospheric drag.

== Current status ==
In 2023, Anelí Bongers and José L. Torres calibrated an economic model to estimate an aggregate threshold value of 72,000 satellites to prevent a Kessler syndrome scenario and explore space debris' unique negative externality, noting that space debris is unique from other forms of pollution due to its direct effect on capital assets. The authors emphasize that the model is simplified and does not distinguish between LEO and GEO, stating "this figure should be considered as a first approximation to the economic capacity of space in terms of the number of a representative satellite," and encouraged further economic analysis of space activities to inform debris mitigation policies.

In 2024, Jon Kelvey noted in an overview article: "The scientific community hasn't yet reached a consensus about whether the Kessler Syndrome has begun, or, if it has not begun, how bad it will be when it starts. There is consensus, however, that the basic concept is sound and that the space community needs to clean up its act."

An analysis in 2025 reported that a large solar storm could knock out the ability to issue avoidance maneuvers of satellites long enough to result in collisions, thus potentially setting into motion a Kessler syndrome, and that there would be less than about three days to take action. This was significantly worse than in 2018 when there were fewer satellites in orbit. The Collision Realization and Significant Harm (CRASH) Clock was developed for calculations involving a solar storm since the Kessler syndrome anticipates a decades-long process.

== In fiction ==
- The 2003 Manga/Anime Planetes has a terrorist organization, the Space Defense Front, try to create a Kessler syndrome catastrophe by colliding an orbital satellite with Space Station Seven, thereby cutting Earth off from the Moon and its sole source of Helium-3, which has become the primary energy source used in the setting.
- The 2013 film Gravity features a Kessler syndrome catastrophe as the inciting incident of the story, when Russia shoots down an old satellite. It was described as "Kessler Syndrome on steroids that defies physics".
- Neal Stephenson's 2015 novel Seveneves begins with the unexplained explosion of the Moon into seven large pieces, the subsequent creation of a cloud of debris by Kessler syndrome collisions, and the eventual bombardment of Earth's surface by lunar meteoroids.
- In Ace Combat 7: Skies Unknown (2019), after the battle over Farbanti, simultaneous Osean and Erusean anti-satellite operations cause a Kessler syndrome scenario, dismantling the planet's satellite systems and causing a near-complete breakdown of communications.

== See also ==
- 1961 and 1963 Project West Ford – Experimental space-based radio communication project
- Space Liability Convention – 1972 treaty that expands on the liability rules in the Outer Space Treaty
- USA-193 – U.S. military satellite (2006–2008)

== Bibliography ==
- Gleghorn, George; et al. (1995). Orbital Debris: A Technical Assessment (PDF) (Report). National Academy of Sciences. ISBN 0-309-05125-8. Archived (PDF) from the original on 8 March 2023.
- Hoots, Felix; Schumacher, Paul Jr.; Glover, Robert A. (2004). "History of Analytical Orbit Modeling in the U.S. Space Surveillance System". Journal of Guidance, Control, and Dynamics. 27 (2): 174–185. Bibcode:2004JGCD...27..174H. doi:10.2514/1.9161.
- Forgan, Duncan H. (2019). Solving Fermi's Paradox. Cambridge Astrobiology. Cambridge University Press. Bibcode:2019sfp..book.....F. doi:10.1017/9781316681510. ISBN 978-1-316-68151-0. OCLC 1098275130. OL 21201773W.
- Hamilton, Chase (2022). "Space and existential risk: The need for global coordination and caution in space development". Duke Law & Technology Review. 21: 1–60.
- Kessler, Donald (1971). "Estimate of Particle Densities and Collision Danger for Spacecraft Moving Through the Asteroid Belt". Physical Studies of Minor Planets. 267. NASA SP-267: 595–605. Bibcode:1971NASSP.267..595K. Archived from the original on 17 October 2015.
- Kessler, Donald; Cour-Palais, Burton (June 1978). "Collision Frequency of Artificial Satellites: The Creation of a Debris Belt" (PDF). Journal of Geophysical Research. 81 (A6): 2637–2646. Bibcode:1978JGR....83.2637K. doi:10.1029/JA083iA06p02637. Archived from the original (PDF) on 15 May 2011.
- Kessler, Donald (1981). "Sources of Orbital Debris and the Projected Environment for Future Spacecraft" (PDF). Journal of Spacecraft. 16 (4): 357–360. Bibcode:1981JSpRo..18..357K. doi:10.2514/3.57828. Archived from the original (PDF) on 14 July 2010.
- Kessler, Donald (December 1991). "Collisional Cascading: The Limits of Population Growth in Low Earth Orbit" (PDF). Advances in Space Research. 11 (12): 63–66. Bibcode:1991AdSpR..11l..63K. doi:10.1016/0273-1177(91)90543-S. Archived from the original (PDF) on 14 July 2010.
- Kessler, Donald; Anz-Meador, Phillip (March 2001). "Critical Number of Spacecraft in Low Earth Orbit: Using Fragmentation Data to Evaluate the Stability of the Orbital Debris Environment" (PDF). Proceedings of the Third European Conference on Space Debris. Darmstadt, Germany. Archived (PDF) from the original on 29 January 2023.
- Kessler, Donald (8 March 2009). The Kessler Syndrome. Western University Canada. Archived from the original on 8 March 2023.
- Lehman, Connor (2023). Autonomous Controls for Active Space Debris Removal (PhD thesis). Rensselaer Polytechnic Institute.
- Schefter, Jim (July 1982). "The Growing Peril of Space Debris". Popular Science. Vol. 221, no. 1. pp. 48–51 – via Google Books.
- Stevens, Adam; Forgan, Duncan H.; O'Malley-James, Jack (2016). "Observational signatures of self-destructive civilizations". International Journal of Astrobiology. 15 (4): 333–344. arXiv:1507.08530. Bibcode:2016IJAsB..15..333S. doi:10.1017/S1473550415000397.
